= List of dams and reservoirs in the United States =

The nearly 8100 major dams in the United States in 2006. The National Inventory of Dams defines a major dam as being 50 feet (15 m) tall with a storage capacity of at least 5,000 acre-feet (6,200,000 m^{3}), or of any height with a storage capacity of 25,000 acre-feet (31,000,000 m^{3}).

The following is a partial list of dams and reservoirs in the United States. There are an estimated 84,000 dams in the United States, impounding 600,000 mi (970,000 km) of river or about 17% of rivers in the nation.

== By state ==
=== Colorado ===
- Aurora Reservoir
- Barker Dam – Barker Reservoir
- Blue Mesa Dam – Blue Mesa Reservoir
- Chatfield Reservoir
- Cherry Creek Reservoir
- Dillon Reservoir
- Electra Lake
- Elkhead Reservoir
- Englewood Dam
- Green Mountain Reservoir
- Gross Dam – Gross Reservoir
- Horsetooth Dam – Horsetooth Reservoir, built as part of the Colorado-Big Thompson project
- John Martin Reservoir
- McNulty Reservoir Dam
- McPhee Dam – McPhee Reservoir
- Morrow Point Dam – Morrow Point Reservoir
- Mount Elbert Forebay Dam
- Navajo Reservoir
- Ridges Basin Dam – Nighthorse Reservoir, built as part of the Animas-La Plata Water Project
- Olympus Dam in Estes Park, Colorado, built as part of the Colorado-Big Thompson project
- Quincy Reservoir, in Aurora
- Ralston Dam
- Ridgway Dam – Ridgway Reservoir, built as part of the Dallas Creek Project
- Silver Jack Dam – Silver Jack Reservoir, part of the Bostwick Park Project
- Trinidad Dam
- Vallecito Reservoir
- Williams Fork Reservoir
- Wolford Mountain Reservoir

=== Connecticut ===
- Beseck Lake Dam
- Candlewood Lake
- Lake Chamberlain
- Leesville Dam – Salmon River
- Maltby Lakes
- Mansfield Hollow Dam – Mansfield Hollow Lake
- Occum Dam
- Saville Dam – Barkhamsted Reservoir
- Samuel P. Senior Dam
- Shepaug Dam - Lake Lillinonah
- Stevenson Dam – Lake Zoar, on the Housatonic River
- West Thompson Dam – Quinebaug River

=== Georgia ===
- Allatoona Dam – Lake Allatoona
- Bartlett's Ferry Dam – Lake Harding
- Lake Blackshear Dam – Lake Blackshear
- Blue Ridge Dam – Blue Ridge Reservoir; on the Toccoa River; finished in 1930; acquired by the TVA in 1939
- Buford Dam – Lake Lanier
- Carters Dam – Carter's Lake
- Chatuge Dam – Chatuge Reservoir; on the Hiwassee River; finished in 1942 by the TVA
- Clark Hill Dam (J. Strom Thurmond Dam) – Lake Strom Thurmond, also in South Carolina
- Lake Delano
- Lake Dorene
- Goat Rock Dam – Goat Rock Lake
- Hartwell Dam – Lake Hartwell, also in South Carolina
- Hickory Log Creek Dam – Hickory Log Creek Reservoir (under construction until Oct 2007)
- Jim Woodruff Dam – Lake Seminole; on Apalachicola River; built by USACE
- Kelly Barnes Dam – Toccoa Falls, failed in 1977 killing 39 people
- Morgan Falls Dam – Bull Sluice Lake
- Nottely Dam – Nottely Reservoir; on the Nottely River; finished in 1942 by the TVA
- Oliver Dam – Lake Oliver
- Richard B. Russell Dam – Richard B. Russell Lake, also in South Carolina
- Richland Creek Reservoir
- Sinclair Dam – Lake Sinclair
- Lake Toccoa
- Wallace Dam – Lake Oconee
- Walter F. George Lake – on the Chattahoochee River; built by USACE
- West Point Dam – West Point Lake

=== Illinois ===
- Fordham Dam
- Kaskaskia Lock and Dam
- Lake Holiday Dam, Lake Holiday
- Chain of Rocks Lock
- McHenry Dam
- Melvin Price Locks and Dam, Alton

=== Louisiana ===
- Bailey's Dam
- Sibley Lake Dam
- Toledo Bend Reservoir

=== Massachusetts ===
- Ashley Reservoir – (Artificial)
- Assawompset Pond Dam – Nemasket River
- Ballardvale Dam – Shawsheen River
- Barre Falls Dam – Ware River
- Barstows Pond Dam – Cotley River
- Birch Hill Dam – Millers River
- Buffumville Dam – Little River
- Cleveland Pond Dam – Beaver Brook
- Conant Brook Dam – Conant Brook
- Crescent Dam - Westfield River
- Dam 1 above Harodite factory – concrete and granite blocks – Three Mile River
- Dam 2 above Harodite factory – concrete – Three Mile River
- Dam at 60 Winnetuxet Road – Winnetuxet River
- Dam at Draka Factory – Three Mile River
- Dam at Furnace Street – Stump Brook
- Dam at Robbins Pond/Bog Reservoir Connection – Stump Brook
- Dam at Route 106 – Satucket River
- East Brimfield Dam – Quinebaug River
- Fall Brook Route 28 Dam – Fall Brook
- First Unnamed Dam – Segreganset River
- Forge Pond Dam – Assonet River
- Forge Pond Dam – Meadow Brook
- Framingham Reservoir No. 1 Dam and Gatehouse
- Framingham Reservoir No. 2 Dam and Gatehouse
- Framingham Reservoir No. 3 Dam and Gatehouse
- Great Quittacas Pond Dam – Nemasket River
- Great Stone Dam – Merrimack River
- Happy Hollow Farm Dam – Fall Brook
- High Street Dam – Town River
- Hodges Village Dam – French River
- Holyoke Dam – Connecticut River
- Hunts Pond Dam (Mill Street Dam) – Beaver Brook
- Indian River Power Supply dam - Westfield River
- Johnson Pond Dam – Forge River
- Hewitt Pond Dam – Forge River
- King's Pond Dam – Pine Swamp Brook
- Knightville Dam – North Branch Westfield River
- Lake Rico Dam – Furnace Brook
- Littleville Dam – Middle Branch, Westfield River
- Monument Dam – Assonet River
- Morey's Bridge Dam – Mill River
- Muddy Cove Brook (Obstruction 1) – gate under railroad tracks just below Route 138 – Muddy Cove Brook
- Muddy Cove Brook (Obstruction 2) – dam on Zeneca Inc. Property – Muddy Cove Brook
- Muddy Cove Pond Dam – Muddy Cove Brook
- Mystic Dam – Upper Mystic Lake
- Oliver Mills Dam – Nemasket River
- Orchard Street Dam – Dam Lot Brook
- Outlet for Bleachery Reservoir (Eastern) – Rattlesnake Brook
- Outlet for Bleachery Reservoir (Western) – Rattlesnake Brook
- Plymouth Street Dam – Taunton River
- Richmond Pond Dam – Richmond Pond
- Segreganset River Dam – Segreganset River
- Stump Brook Dam – Stump Brook
- Swansea Dam – Swansea, Massachusetts
- Taunton State Hospital Dam – Mill River
- Tisdale Dam – Assonet River
- Tracy Pond Dam – Forge River
- Tully Dam – Millers River
- Turners Falls Dam – Connecticut River
- Unnamed dam above Berkley Street – Tributary above Berkley Street in Taunton (MA)
- Unnamed dam at Raynham Department of Parks & Recreation Office – Forge River
- Wachusett Dam – Wachusett Reservoir
- War Memorial Park Dam – Town River
- Wareham Street Dam – Nemasket River
- West Brittania Dam – Mill River
- West Hill Dam – West River
- West Springfield Dam - Westfield River
- Westville Dam – Quinebaug River
- Whittenton Street Dam – Mill River (removed)
- Willow Avenue Dam – Meadow Brook
- Winnetuxet Road Dam – Winnetuxet River
- Winsor Dam – Quabbin Reservoir
- Woronoco Dam - Westfield River
- Wrights Complex Lower Dam – concrete and cut stone masonry – Quaboag River

=== Mississippi ===
- Aberdeen Lock and Dam – Aberdeen Lake
- Jamie Whitten Lock and Dam
- John C. Stennis Lock and Dam – Columbus Lake
- Okatibbee Dam
- Ross Barnett Reservoir and Spillway
- Grenada Lake

=== Missouri ===
- Amarugia Lake
- Atkinson Lake
- Bean Lake
- Big Lake
- Bilby Ranch Lake
- Binder Lake
- Blind Pony Lake
- Blue Springs Lake
- Bull Shoals Lake (extends into Arkansas)
- Bushwacker Lake
- Cameron City Lakes
- Che-Ru Lake
- Clearwater Lake
- Cooley Lake
- Cottontail Lake
- Fellows Lake
- Flight Lake
- Forest Lake
- Halls Lake
- Henry Sever Lake
- Hunnewell Lake
- Indian Creek Lake
- Kendzora Lake
- Lake Girardeau
- Lake of the Ozarks
- Lake Paho
- Lake Springfield
- Lake Taneycomo
- Little Compton Lake
- Little Dixie Lake
- Little Prairie Community Lake
- Longview Lake
- Lower Taum Sauk Lake
- Manito Lake
- Maple Leaf Lake
- Mark Twain Lake
- McDaniel Lake
- Miller Community Lake
- Montrose Lake
- Nodaway County Lake
- Norfork Lake (extends into Arkansas)
- Perry County Community Lake
- Pomme de Terre Lake
- Pony Express Lake
- Ray County Community Lake
- Rocky Fork Lake
- Sears Community Lake
- Shawnee Mac Lakes
- Sims Valley Community Lake
- Smithville Lake
- Stockton Lake
- Table Rock Lake (extends into Arkansas)
- Thomas Hill Lake
- Tri-City Lake
- Truman Reservoir (largest lake in Missouri)
- Upper Big Lake
- Vandalia Lake
- Wappapello Lake
- Weatherby Lake
- Williams Creek Lake

=== New Mexico ===
- Abiquiu Lake
- Bluewater Lake
- Cochiti Dam
- Conchas Lake
- Elephant Butte Dike
- El Vado Reservoir
- Galisteo Dam
- Heron Lake
- Jemez Canyon Dam
- Navajo Lake
- Santa Rosa Dam
- Two Rivers Dam
- Ute Dam

=== North Carolina ===
- Lake Adger - Green River (North Carolina); completed in 1925
- Apalachia Dam – Apalachia Reservoir; on the Hiwassee River; finished in 1943 by the TVA
- Lake Blue Devil – Duke Power
- Cheoah Dam – built in 1919 and owned by Alcoa
- Cowans Ford Dam and Lake Norman – Duke Power
- Falls Lake – USACE
- Fontana Dam – Fontana Lake; on the Little Tennessee River; finished in 1944 by the TVA
- Gaston Dam – Lake Gaston; on the Roanoke River; built by the Virginia Electric Power Company (VEPCO)
- High Rock Lake – on the Yadkin River; built in 1927 by USACE and operated today by Alcoa
- Hiwassee Dam – Hiwassee Reservoir; on the Hiwassee River; finished in 1940 by the TVA
- B. Everett Jordan Lake – on the Haw River; built by USACE
- Little River Reservoir – finished in 1987
- Lake Louise – built in 1927
- Lake Lure – Duke Power
- Lake Michie – finished in 1926, on the Flat River
- Mountain Island Dam and Mountain Island Lake – Duke Power
- Randleman Lake Dam, completed in 2003
- Rocky Mount Mills Dam - built in the early 1800s at a rocky outcrop for which the city is named; designed to accommodate the needs of the cotton mill
- Santeetlah Dam – built in 1928 and owned by Alcoa
- Tar River Reservoir - Owned by the City of Rocky Mount and used for the city's water supply
- Tuxedo Dam - Lake Summit on the Green River (North Carolina); completed in 1920

=== Ohio ===
- Acton Lake
- Alum Creek Lake
- Atwood Lake
- Beach City Lake
- Bolivar Dam
- Caesar Creek Lake
- Charles Mill Lake
- Choctaw Lake
- Clarence J. Brown Reservoir
- Clearfork Reservoir
- Clendening Lake
- Comet Lake
  - Comet Lake Dam
- Cowan Lake
- Deer Creek Lake
- Delaware Dam
- Dillon Lake
- Dover Dam
- Englewood Dam
- Germantown Dam
- Grand Lake St. Marys – Reservoir for the now defunct Miami and Erie Canal
- Griggs Dam
- Hannibal Locks and Dam
- Hoover Dam
- Huffman Dam
- LaDue Reservoir
- Lake Glacier Dam
- Lake Milton
- Leesville Lake
- Liggett Lake
  - Liggett Lake Dam
- Lockington Dam
- Madison Lake
  - Madison Lake Dam
- Michael J. Kirwan Reservoir
- Mohawk Dam
- Mohicanville Dam
- North Branch of Kokosing River Lake
- O'Shaughnessy Dam
- Paint Creek Lake
- Piedmont Lake
- Pleasant Hill Lake
- Providence Dam
- Salt Fork Reservoir
- Senecaville Lake
- Tappan Lake
- Taylorsville Dam
- Tom Jenkins Dam
- William Harsha Lake
- Wills Creek Lake

=== Oklahoma ===
- Altus City Reservoir
- Lake Altus-Lugert
- American Horse Lake
- Lake of the Arbuckles
- Arcadia Lake
- Ardmore City Lake
- Atoka Lake
- Bellcow Lake
- Birch Lake
- Lake Bixhoma
- Black Kettle Lake
- Bluestem Lake
- Boomer Lake
- Broken Bow Lake
- Brushy Creek Reservoir
- Lake Burtschi
- Canton Lake
- Carl Albert Lake
- Carl Blackwell Lake
- Lake Carl Etling
- Lake Carlton
- Carter Lake
- Cedar Lake
- Chandler Lake
- Lake Checotah
- Lake Chickasha
- Chouteau Lock and Dam
- Claremore Lake
- Clayton Lake
- Clear Creek Lake
- Cleveland City Lake
- Clinton Lake
- Coalgate City Lake
- Comanche Lake
- Copan Lake
- Cordell Reservoir
- Crowder Lake
- Cushing Municipal Lake
- Lake Dahlgren
- Dripping Springs Lake
- Lake Durant
- Lake Ellsworth
- Lake El Reno
- Lake Eucha
- Foss Reservoir
- Fort Cobb Reservoir
- Fort Gibson Lake
- Fort Supply Lake
- Fuqua Lake
- Greenleaf Lake
- Grand Lake O' the Cherokees
- Great Salt Plains Lake
- Guthrie Lake
- Heyburn Lake
- Lake Hudson (formerly named Markham Ferry Reservoir)
- Hulah Lake
- Lake Jean Neustadt
- Lake Jed Johnson
- Keystone Lake
- Konawa Reservoir
- Lake Lawtonka
- Liberty Lake
- Lloyd Church Lake
- McGee Creek Reservoir
- Nanih Waiya Lake
- Lake McMurtry
- Mountain Lake
- Lake Murray
- Oklahoma Lake
- Okmulgee Lake
- Lake Overholser
- Ozzie Cobb Lake
- Pine Creek Lake
- Pauls Valley Lake
- Lake R.C. Longmire
- Raymond Gary Lake
- Rock Creek Reservoir
- Shawnee Twin Lakes
- Skiatook Lake
- Sooner Lake
- Lake Spavinaw
- Sportsman Lake
- Lake Stanley Draper
- Tom Steed Reservoir
- Lake Talequah
- Lake Thunderbird
- Waurika Lake
- Lake Wayne Wallace
- W.D. Mayo Lock and Dam
- Webbers Falls Reservoir
- Wes Watkins Reservoir
- Wewoka Lake
- Lake Wister
- Lake W. R. Holway
- Lake Yahola

=== Oregon ===
- Antelope Reservoir – Jack Creek, a tributary of Jordan Creek (Owyhee River tributary)
- Applegate Lake – Applegate River
- Blue River Reservoir – Blue River, a tributary of the McKenzie River
- Brownlee Dam – Snake River
- Bull Run Lake and Reservoirs 1 and 2 – Bull Run River
- Chickahominy Reservoir – Chickahominy Creek, a tributary of Silver Creek
- Cooper Creek Reservoir – Cooper Creek, an Umpqua River tributary
- Cottage Grove Lake – Coast Fork Willamette River
- Cougar Reservoir and Cougar Dam – South Fork McKenzie River
- Crane Prairie Reservoir – Deschutes River
- Detroit Lake and Detroit Dam – North Santiam River
- Dexter Reservoir and Dexter Dam – Middle Fork Willamette River
- Devils Lake – D River
- Dorena Reservoir - Row River
- Emigrant Lake – Emigrant Creek, a tributary of Bear Creek (Rogue River)
- Fern Ridge Reservoir – Long Tom River
- Foster Reservoir and Foster Dam – South Santiam River
- Gatehouse, Portland City Reservoir No. 2
- Green Peter Reservoir and Green Peter Dam– Middle Santiam River
- Hells Canyon Reservoir and Hells Canyon Dam – Snake River
- Henry Hagg Lake and Scoggins Dam – Scoggins Creek, a tributary of the Tualatin River
- Hills Creek Reservoir & Hills Creek Dam – Middle Fork Willamette River
- John C. Boyle Dam – Klamath River
- Lake Billy Chinook & Round Butte Dam – Crooked, Deschutes, and Metolius rivers
- Lake Bonneville & Bonneville Dam – Columbia River
- Lake Celilo & The Dalles Dam – Columbia River
- Lake Umatilla & John Day Dam – Columbia River
- Lake Wallula & McNary Dam – Columbia River
- Lookout Point Lake & Lookout Point Dam – Middle Fork Willamette River
- Lost Creek Lake & William L. Jess Dam – Rogue River
- McGuire Reservoir – Nestucca River
- McNulty Reservoir (Malheur County, Oregon)
- North Fork Reservoir – Clackamas River
- Owyhee Reservoir – Owyhee River
- Oxbow Dam – Snake River
- Pelton Dam – Deschutes River
- Phillips Lake – Powder River
- Prineville Reservoir & Bowman Dam a.k.a. Prineville Dam – Crooked River
- Silverton Reservoir – Silver Creek
- Thief Valley Reservoir – Powder River
- Upper McNulty Reservoir
- Warm Springs Reservoir – Malheur River
- Wickiup Reservoir – Deschutes River

=== South Carolina ===
- Conestee Mill Dam – Conestee Lake
- Hartwell Dam – Lake Hartwell, also in the U.S. state of Georgia
- Clark Hill Dam (J. Strom Thurmond Dam) – Lake Strom Thurmond, also in the U.S. state of Georgia
- Jocassee Dam – Lake Jocassee
- Keowee Dam
- Monticello Reservoir – Jenkinsville, South Carolina
- Pinopolis Dam – Lake Moultrie
- Richard B. Russell Dam – Richard B. Russell Lake, also in the U.S. state of Georgia
- Saluda Dam – Lake Murray
- Santee Dam – Lake Marion

=== Tennessee ===
- Boone Dam — Boone Lake; on the South Fork Holston River; finished in 1952 by the TVA
- Burgess Falls Dam; on the Falling Water River; built by City of Cookeville for electric generation after the flood of 1928 destroyed a previous earthen dam
- Calderwood Dam; on the Little Tennessee River; built in 1930 and owned by Alcoa
- Cedar Dam — Cedar Reservoir; on Haley Creek, tributary of the Beech River; finished in 1963 by the TVA
- Center Hill Dam — Center Hill Lake; on the Caney Fork; finished in 1948 by the United States Army Corps of Engineers
- Cheatham Dam — Cheatham Lake; on the Cumberland River; finished in 1952 by the United States Army Corps of Engineers
- Cherokee Dam — Cherokee Lake; on the Holston River; finished in 1941 by the TVA
- Chickamauga Dam — Chickamauga Lake; on the Tennessee River; built 1940 by the TVA
- Chilhowee Dam; on the Little Tennessee River; built in 1957 and owned by Alcoa
- Cordell Hull Dam — Cordell Hull Lake; on the Cumberland River; finished in 1973 by the United States Army Corps of Engineers
- Dale Hollow Dam — Dale Hollow Reservoir on the Obey River completed in 1943 by the United States Army Corps of Engineers
- Dogwood Dam — Dogwood Reservoir; on Big Creek, tributary of the Beech River; finished in 1965 by the TVA
- Douglas Dam — Douglas Lake; on the French Broad River; finished in 1943 by the TVA
- Elk River Dam — Woods Reservoir; on the Elk River; finished in 1952 by the Corps of Engineers, to provide cooling water for the U.S. Air Force's Arnold Engineering Development Center
- Fall Creek Falls Dam — Fall Creek Falls Reservoir; on Falls Creek; finished in 1970 by the Tennessee Department of Environment and Conservation
- Fort Loudoun Dam — Fort Loudoun Lake; on the Tennessee River; finished in 1943 by the TVA
- Fort Patrick Henry Dam — Fort Patrick Henry Lake; on the South Fork Holston River; finished in 1953 by the TVA
- Great Falls Dam — Great Falls Reservoir; on the Caney Fork; finished in 1916 by the Tennessee Electric Power Co.; acquired by the TVA in 1939
- Hales Bar Dam; on the Tennessee River, TVA dam mostly demolished in 1968, replaced by Nickajack Dam
- Herb Parsons Dam — Herb Parsons Lake; on Mary's Creek
- J. Percy Priest Dam — Percy Priest Lake; on the Stones River; finished in 1968 by the United States Army Corps of Engineers
- Lost Creek Dam; flood control dam with no permanent reservoir; on Lost Creek, tributary of the Beech River; finished in 1963 by the TVA
- Melton Hill Dam — Melton Hill Lake; on the Clinch River; finished in 1963 by the TVA
- Nickajack Dam — Nickajack Lake; on the Tennessee River; finished in 1967 by the TVA
- Nolichucky Dam — Davy Crockett Lake; on the Nolichucky River; finished in 1913 by the Tennessee Eastern Electric Co.; acquired by the TVA in 1945; taken out of service in 1972
- Normandy Dam — Normandy Reservoir; on the Duck River; finished in 1976 by the TVA
- Norris Dam — Norris Lake; on the Clinch River; finished in 1936 by the TVA
- Ocoee Dam No. 1 — Parksville Reservoir; on the Ocoee River; finished in 1911 by the Eastern Tennessee Power Co.; acquired by the TVA in 1939
- Ocoee Dam No. 2 — Ocoee Reservoir No. 2; on the Ocoee River; finished in 1913 by the Eastern Tennessee Power Co.; acquired by the TVA in 1939
- Ocoee Dam No. 3 — Ocoee Reservoir No. 3; on the Ocoee River; finished in 1942 by the TVA
- Old Hickory Lock and Dam — Old Hickory Lake; on the Cumberland River; finished in 1957 by the United States Army Corps of Engineers
- Pickwick Landing Dam — Pickwick Lake; on the Tennessee River; finished in 1938 by the TVA
- Pin Oak Dam — Pin Oak Reservoir; on Browns Creek, tributary of the Beech River; finished in 1964 by the TVA
- Pine Dam — Pine Reservoir; on Piney Creek, tributary of the Beech River; finished in 1964 by the TVA
- Raccoon Mountain Pumped-Storage Plant — Raccoon Mountain Reservoir; on McNabb Branch but discharges into the Tennessee River; finished in 1978 by the TVA
- Radnor Dam — Radnor Lake; on Otter Creek; built by the Louisville and Nashville Railroad Company in 1914, for watering steam locomotives and supplying water for shipped livestock
- Redbud Dam — Redbud Reservoir; on Dry Creek, tributary of the Beech River; finished in 1965 by the TVA
- South Holston Dam — South Holston Lake; on the South Fork Holston River; finished in 1950 by the TVA
- Sycamore Dam — Sycamore Reservoir; on Dry Branch, tributary of the Beech River; finished in 1965 by the TVA
- Tellico Dam — Tellico Lake; on the Little Tennessee River; finished in 1979 by the TVA
- Tims Ford Dam — Tims Ford Lake; on the Elk River; finished in 1970 by the TVA
- Watauga Dam — Watauga Lake; on the Watauga River; finished in 1948 by the TVA
- Watts Bar Dam — Watts Bar Lake; on the Tennessee River; finished in 1942 by the TVA
- Walterhill Dam — Walterhill Floodplain State Natural Area; on Stones River; finished in early 1900s.
- Wilbur Dam — Wilbur Lake (tennessee); on the Watauga River; finished in 1912 by the Watauga Power Co.; acquired by the TVA in 1945
- New Shoal Creek Dam; on Shoal Creek (Sycamore River), (Lawrence County, Lawrenceburg, Tennessee)

=== Virginia ===
- Beaver Creek Dam – flood control dam with no permanent reservoir; on Beaver Creek; finished in 1965 by the TVA
- Bosher's Dam (also called Bosher Dam) – on the James River; first built in 1823
- Clear Creek Dam and Clear Creek Reservoir – on Clear Creek; finished in 1965 by the TVA
- Claytor Dam (hydroelectric) – on the New River; home of Claytor Lake State Park; between Dublin and Radford
- John H. Kerr Dam and John H. Kerr Lake – on the Roanoke River; built by USACE; reservoir covers parts of Virginia/North Carolina border
- Lake of The Woods Dam – near Fredericksburg
- Lake of the Woods Dam Number Two – near Fredericksburg
- Leesville Dam – on the Roanoke River; operated by Appalachian Power as part of the Smith Mountain pumped storage project
- Little River Dam (hydroelectric) – on the Little River; owned by the city of Radford
- Martinsville Dam – on the Smith River
- Martinsville Fish Dam – NRHP landmark on the Smith River
- Niagara Dam (hydroelectric) – on the Roanoke River near Vinton, Virginia; built in 1904
- Philpott Lake – near Roanoke
- Smith Mountain Dam (hydroelectric) and Smith Mountain Lake – on the Roanoke River; operated by Appalachian Power (American Electric Power)
- Spring Hollow Reservoir – on the Roanoke River
- Walker's Dam – on the Chickahominy River; forms Chickahominy Lake; operated by Newport News Waterworks

=== Washington ===
- Blue Gulch Reservoir Dam
- Bonneville Dam – Lake Bonneville (between Washington and Oregon)
- Boundary Dam – Pend Oreille River
- Box Canyon Dam – Pend Oreille River
- Casad Dam – Union River
- Chief Joseph Dam – Rufus Woods Lake
- Culmback Dam – Spada Lake, Jackson Hydro Project
- Dry Falls Dam – Banks Lake
- Diablo Dam and Diablo Lake – Skagit River, Seattle City Light
- Gorge Dam – Skagit River, Seattle City Light
- Grand Coulee Dam, largest hydroelectricity plant in the U.S. – Franklin D. Roosevelt Lake
- Howard A. Hanson Dam – Green River, Howard A. Hanson Reservoir
- Ice Harbor Lock and Dam, Lake Sacajawea, lower Snake River
- John Day Dam – Lake Umatilla (between Washington and Oregon)
- Lake Lawrence Dam – Lake Lawrence
- Little Goose Lock and Dam, Lake Bryan, lower Snake River
- Lower Granite Lock and Dam, Lower Granite Lake, lower Snake River
- Lower Monumental Lock and Dam, Lake Herbert G. West, lower Snake River
- Masonry Dam, Chester Morse Lake, Cedar River
- McNary Dam – Lake Wallula (between Washington and Oregon)
- Merwin Dam – Lake Merwin
- Mossyrock Dam – Riffe Lake
- Priest Rapids Dam – Priest Rapids Lake
- Rock Island Dam – Rock Island Pool
- Rocky Reach Dam – Lake Entiat
- Ross Dam and Ross Lake – Skagit River, Seattle City Light
- Roza Dam – Yakima River
- Swift Dam – Swift Reservoir
- The Dalles Dam – Lake Celilo (between Washington and Oregon)
- Tieton Dam – Rimrock Lake
- Wanapum Dam – Lake Wanapum
- Wells Dam – Lake Pateros
- Wynoochee Dam – Lake Wynoochee
- Yale Dam – Yale Lake

== Other areas ==
=== District of Columbia ===
- Dalecarlia Reservoir
- Georgetown Reservoir
- McMillan Reservoir

== See also ==
- List of dam removals in the United States
- List of canals in the United States
- List of dams and reservoirs
- List of lakes of the United States
- List of rivers of the United States
- List of tallest dams in the United States
- List of United States Bureau of Reclamation dams
- List of waterways
