= Madison Lake =

Madison Lake may refer to:

- Madison Lake, Ohio, a community
  - Madison Lake (Ohio), the body of water the community is named after
  - Madison Lake Dam, the dam that created the lake
  - Madison Lake State Park, the state park that formed around the lake
- Madison Lake, Minnesota, a community
  - Madison Lake (Minnesota), the body of water the community is named after
