= RCR =

RCR may stand for:

- Race Course Road, a road in New Delhi, India
  - 7, Race Course Road, the official residence and principal workplace of the Prime Minister of India
- RCR Arquitectes, Pritzker Prize winning architects
- Radio Caracas Radio, a Venezuelan radio station
- Ranchi Rays, Indian field hockey team
- Rational consequence relation, a type of consequence relation in mathematical logic
- Ramsbottom Carbon Residue
- RC Relizane, an Algerian football club
- RCR Tomlinson
- Real closed ring, in mathematics
- Research and Development Center for Radio Systems, see Association of Radio Industries and Businesses
- Resorts of the Canadian Rockies
- Retro City Rampage, a 2012 video game
- Rhodes, Chalmers & Rhodes, a vocal group consisting of Charles Chalmers, Sandy Rhodes, and Donna Rhodes, the latter two formerly of the singer-songwriter duo The Lonesome Rhodes
- Richard Childress Racing, a championship-winning NASCAR team
- Richland Creek Reservoir, in the U.S. state of Georgia
- Riot City Ravens, a roller derby league in Newport, Wales
- River City Renaissance, a 1993 urban renewal program in Jacksonville, Florida
- River City Rollergirls, a roller derby team in Richmond, Virginia
- The Royal Canadian Regiment (The RCR)
- Rochor MRT station, Singapore (MRT station abbreviation)
- Rolling circle replication, in nucleic acid replication
- Royal College of Radiologists, a British professional body
- Fulton County Airport (IATA: RCR)
