= Charles River Natural Valley Storage Area =

Protected area in Massachusetts

The Charles River Natural Valley Storage Area comprises over 8,000 acres (3,200 ha) of protected land in the middle and upper watershed of the Charles River in eastern Massachusetts in the United States. The lands were acquired by the United States Army Corps of Engineers and are managed by the Massachusetts Division of Fisheries and Wildlife. The project's field office is located at West Hill Dam.

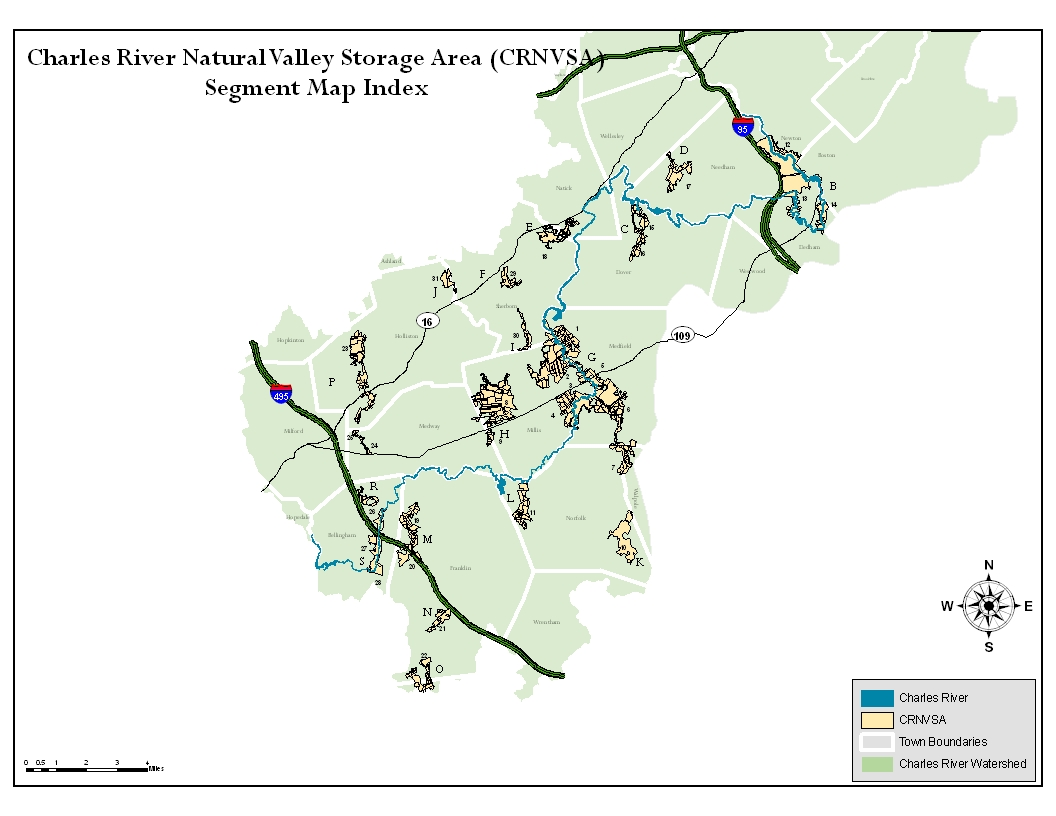
Segment Map Index

== History ==
The Indian name for the Charles River was Quinobequin, meaning "meandering". Captain John Smith, however, named the Charles River for Charles I of England and, in doing so, interested the monarch in its potential for trade and settlement. The Charles River offered the opportunity for early settlers to acquire land, wealth and freedom from political and religious oppression by providing a water highway to the interior. The winding river rambles for 80 miles (130 km) from its headwaters, drains an area over 300 square miles (780 km^{2}) and is the most densely populated river basin in New England.

The Charles River is one of the most beautiful urban rivers in the country. In cooperation with the Commonwealth of Massachusetts, the US Army Corps of Engineers has implemented a program that not only protects the urbanized watershed from flooding, but also safeguards valuable wetlands and provides areas for wildlife and recreation.

Torrential rains from hurricanes in 1938, 1955 and 1968 caused water levels to rise and rivers to overflow their banks in communities across New England. The floodwaters caused millions of dollars in damage and took hundreds of lives throughout New England. Along the Charles River, the residents and properties of the lower Charles are the most seriously affected when flooding occurs.

As a result of these floods, the Corps of Engineers conducted a study that determined the best way to protect the populous lower basin of the Charles River was to construct a pumping station capable of rapidly discharging the floodwater into Boston Harbor. The study also determined that the best way to protect the middle and upper portions of the river system from future flooding would be to protect the natural storage capacities of the wetlands.

== Flood control ==
The lower 9-mile (14 km) portion of the watershed known as the "Charles River Basin" was created in 1910 with the construction of a dam across the mouth of the river. There was no dependable means of discharging river flood flows into Boston Harbor, since the dam relied on gravity flow with the sluice gates operating only at low tide. In addition, the dam effectively eliminates salt water intrusion into the Charles. The congested cities of Boston and Cambridge, and the upstream communities of Watertown, Waltham, Brookline and Newton, were often exposed to the threat of serious flood damages.

In 1968, Congress authorized the Corps to build the new Charles River Dam at the mouth of the Charles in Boston. The $61 million structure was completed in 1978. Six pumps at the dam maintain a safe basin level by discharging river flows into the harbor. Each 3,000-horsepower diesel engine pump is capable of discharging 630,000 gallons of water per minute. The structure includes navigation locks to handle ever-increasing boat traffic. The dam is now operated and maintained by the Massachusetts Water Resources Authority of Massachusetts.

Studies by the Corps of Engineers revealed that the communities above Newton had a history of only minimal flooding. Extensive marshes, swamps and wet meadows scattered around the upper watershed were holding floodwaters and then only slowly letting them go.

In 1974, Congress authorized the "Charles River Natural Valley Storage Area", allowing for the acquisition and permanent protection of 17 scattered wetlands in the middle and upper watershed. Final acquisition totaled 8,103 acres (3,279 ha), with 3,221 acres (1,303 ha) of land acquired in fee and 4,882 acres (1,976 ha) in flood easement, at a project cost of $8,300,000. The Massachusetts Division of Fisheries and Wildlife manages the fish and wildlife resources in some of the Corps' fee-owned land.

== Preservation ==
The Corps of Engineers has acquired the natural valley storage areas of the Charles River to be maintained in a natural state in perpetuity.

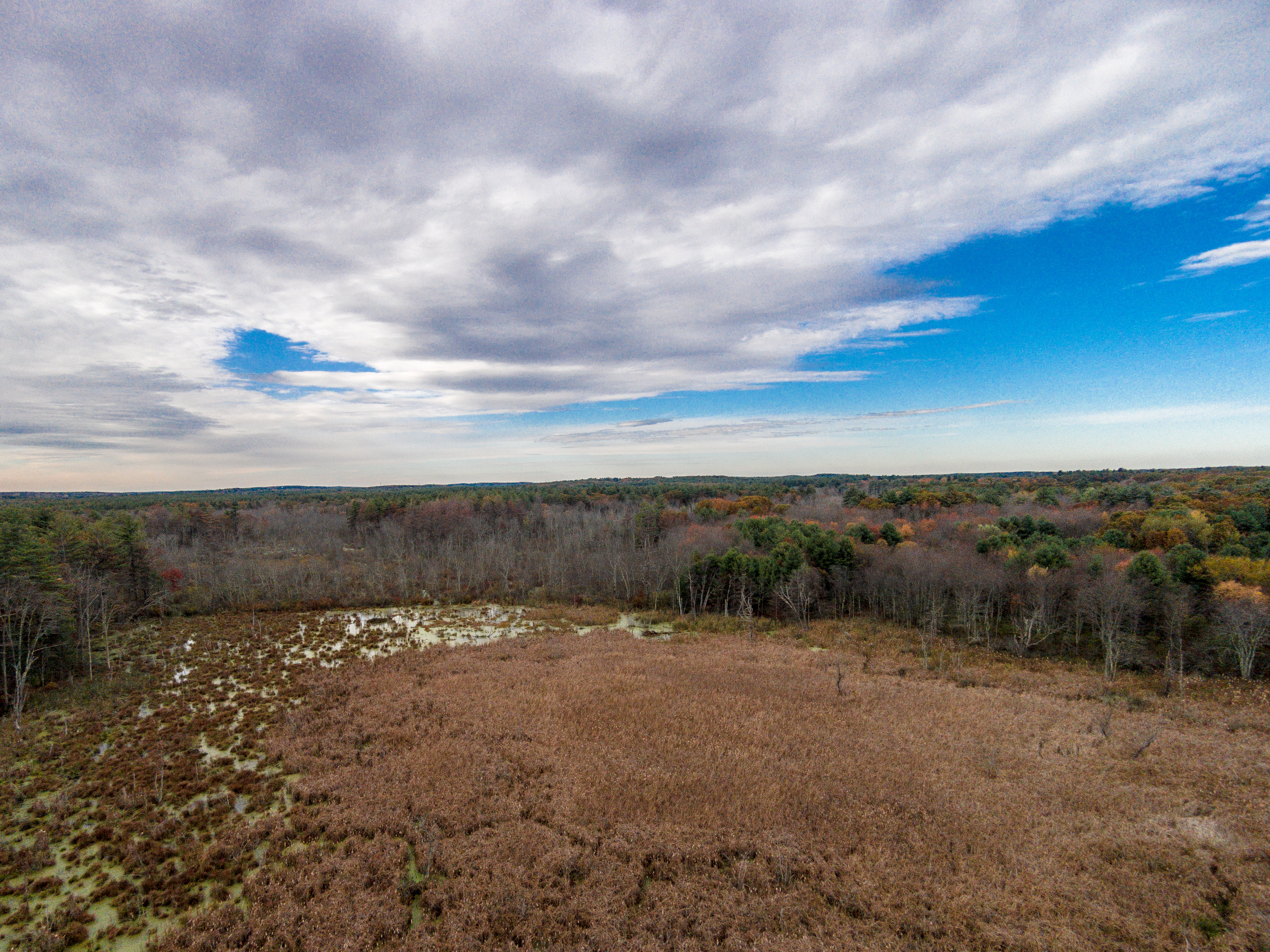
Charles River Natural Valley Storage Area, Millis, MA

The Charles River Natural Valley Storage flood control project was authorized by Public Law 93-251 as a "multi-purpose" project for flood control, recreation and fish and wildlife management. As a result, all land was acquired to be preserved in its natural state and to prevent any alteration of natural drainage characteristics.

The Corps is dedicated to safeguarding these natural areas as green space for flood protection, recreation, wildlife habitat and guaranteed protection of open areas. The Charles River must remain a legacy pass by this generation to all those that follow.

== Recreation ==
The lands and waters of the Charles River Natural Valley Storage Area offer an important addition to public recreation in eastern Massachusetts. The lands provide needed open space for passive recreation activities such as birdwatching, hiking, canoeing, fishing and cross-country skiing. This is an exceptional setting for natural walking, especially during the fall foliage season when the abundant red maples show their crimson colors.

The Massachusetts Division of Fisheries and Wildlife provides annual stocking of trout in the Charles River and its tributary brooks and rivers. In a region of rapid suburban growth, the Charles River Natural Valley Storage Project offers an opportunity for continued enjoyment of natural and recreational resources for years to come.

== See also ==
- West Hill Dam
- Charles River
