= Ridgway Dam =

Coordinates: 38°14′13″N 107°45′31″W

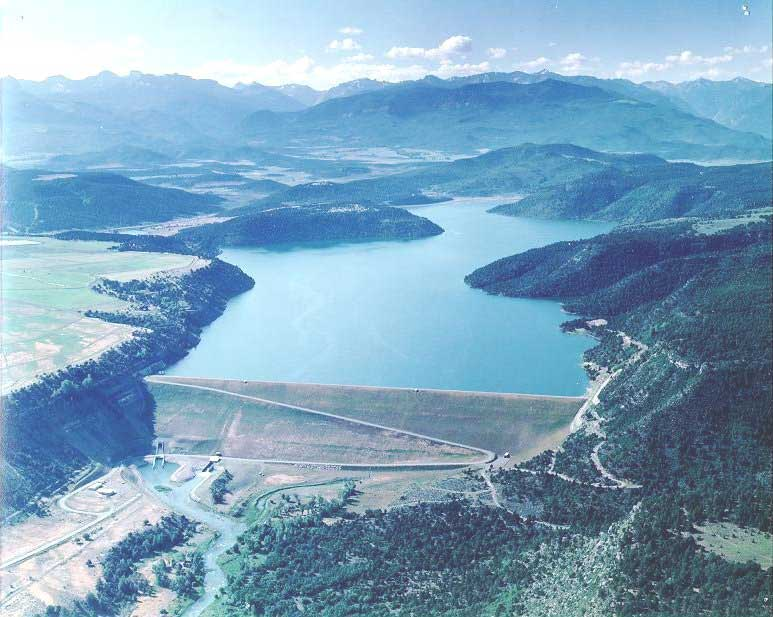
- Interactive map of Ridgway Dam
- Country: United States
- Status: Operational
- Construction began: 1978
- Opening date: 1987

Ridgway Dam is an earthen dam on the Uncompahgre River which impounds Ridgway Reservoir, located about 6 miles (10 km) north of the town of Ridgway in Ouray County, Colorado. The dam is 332 ft (101 m) high and 2,465 ft (751 m) long, with a capacity of 84,410 acre⋅ft (104,120,000 m^{3}) of water.

Ridgway Dam was built as part of the Dallas Creek Project. Construction began in 1978 and completed in 1987. The construction of the dam forced the re-routing of U.S. Highway 550 to the east and the abandonment of the Ridgway Branch of the Denver and Rio Grande Western Railroad.

== Hydroelectric retrofitting ==
In 2014, work was completed on retrofitting the dam to add a hydroelectric plant. The dam's operator, Tri-County Water Conservancy District, installed two turbines and generators, an 8 kW system and a 7.2 MW system. The larger one is used in summer and the smaller one in winter. The electricity created is sold to the Tri-State Generation & Transmission Association and to the City of Aspen. Construction of the new hydroelectric project cost approximately $18 million. In an average year, the two generators produce about 24,000 megawatt hours of electric power.

== See also ==
- List of reservoirs and dams in the United States
