= Comet, Summit County, Ohio =

Community in Summit County, Ohio, US

Comet, Ohio
- Unincorporated community
- Location within Ohio
- Coordinates: 40°55′21″N 81°31′32″W
- Country: United States
- State: Ohio
- Counties: Summit
- Elevation: 988 ft (301 m)
- Time zone: UTC-5 (Eastern (EST))
  - Summer (DST): UTC-4 (EDT)
- ZIP code: 44216
- Area code: 330
- GNIS feature ID: 1039285

Comet is an unincorporated community in Green Township, Summit County, Ohio, United States. It is located on the northwestern end of Comet Lake and wholly within the city of Green.

The Comet Post Office was established on May 23, 1883, and discontinued on July 31, 1903. Mail service is now handled through the Clinton branch.
