= Holyoke Water Works =

Public drinking water utility in Holyoke, Massachusetts

- Official wordmark of the HWW

Agency overview
- Formed: 7 March 1872 (154 years ago)
- Type: Municipal
- Jurisdiction: Holyoke & Southampton
- Headquarters: 20 Commercial Street Holyoke, MA 01040
- Employees: 25 (2016)
- Annual budget: $5,373,834 (FY 2017)
- Agency executives: David M. Conti, General Manager; Matt Smith, Supervisor, Source of Supply
- Parent department: Holyoke Board of Water Commissioners
- Key document: An Act to Supply the Town of Holyoke with Pure Water (1872, c. 62)
- Website: www.holyoke.org/departments/water-works

The Holyoke Water Works (HWW), sometimes referred to as the Holyoke Reservoir System, is a public drinking water utility and municipal service agency of the City of Holyoke, Massachusetts, which provides clean drinking water to that city. Founded in 1872 by an act of Massachusetts General Court, the system was developed as a series of reservoirs to serve the growing city's residents and industry at the end of the 19th century. Today its two primary drinking water sources are the Tighe-Carmody Reservoir in Southampton, Massachusetts and McLean Reservoir in Holyoke. While it maintains reserve drinking water supplies at the Ashley and the Whiting Street Reservoirs.

The Water Works is entirely responsible for drinking water supplies, infrastructure, and watershed land conservancy, however it does not maintain sewage or stormwater treatment infrastructure or services, which fall under the responsibilities Department of Public Works.

== Service area ==
The HWW service area primarily covers Holyoke, however has inactive connections to the Southampton Water Department (SWD) which split off of the raw water supply, providing the majority of the town's water as recently as 2002. In constructing a pipeline to the Tighe-Carmody Reservoir in 1953, the Water Works was required to supply 5 "Y branches" splitting off said pipeline of at least 8" in diameter, in locations decided by the town selectmen; two remain today. Though presently inactive, the town is allowed to draw at no cost up to 125 gallons per resident per day, not exceeding 625,000 gallons per day without a prior rate negotiated with the HWW. Though fluoridated and treated with chlorine, the Water Works' Reservoir System remains one of only 4 systems in the Commonwealth with no filtration, due to the quality of its water supply, with the only others being the Massachusetts Water Resources Authority and its Quabbin Reservoir system, and the water departments of Northfield and Concord.

=== Private wells ===
More than 99% of Holyoke's households are provided water by the Reservoir System, however some homes in the Smith's Ferry and Rock Valley areas remain supplied by private wells. Those in Rock Valley draw from the Barnes Aquifer and may however require additional home filtration due to trichloroethylene (TCE) contamination from industrial degreasers dumped in the area by General Electric during the 1950s; for this reason the City no longer maintains public wells there following the closure of the Pequot and Coronet Hills wells in 1988.
