= Riley, Oregon =

- Unincorporated town
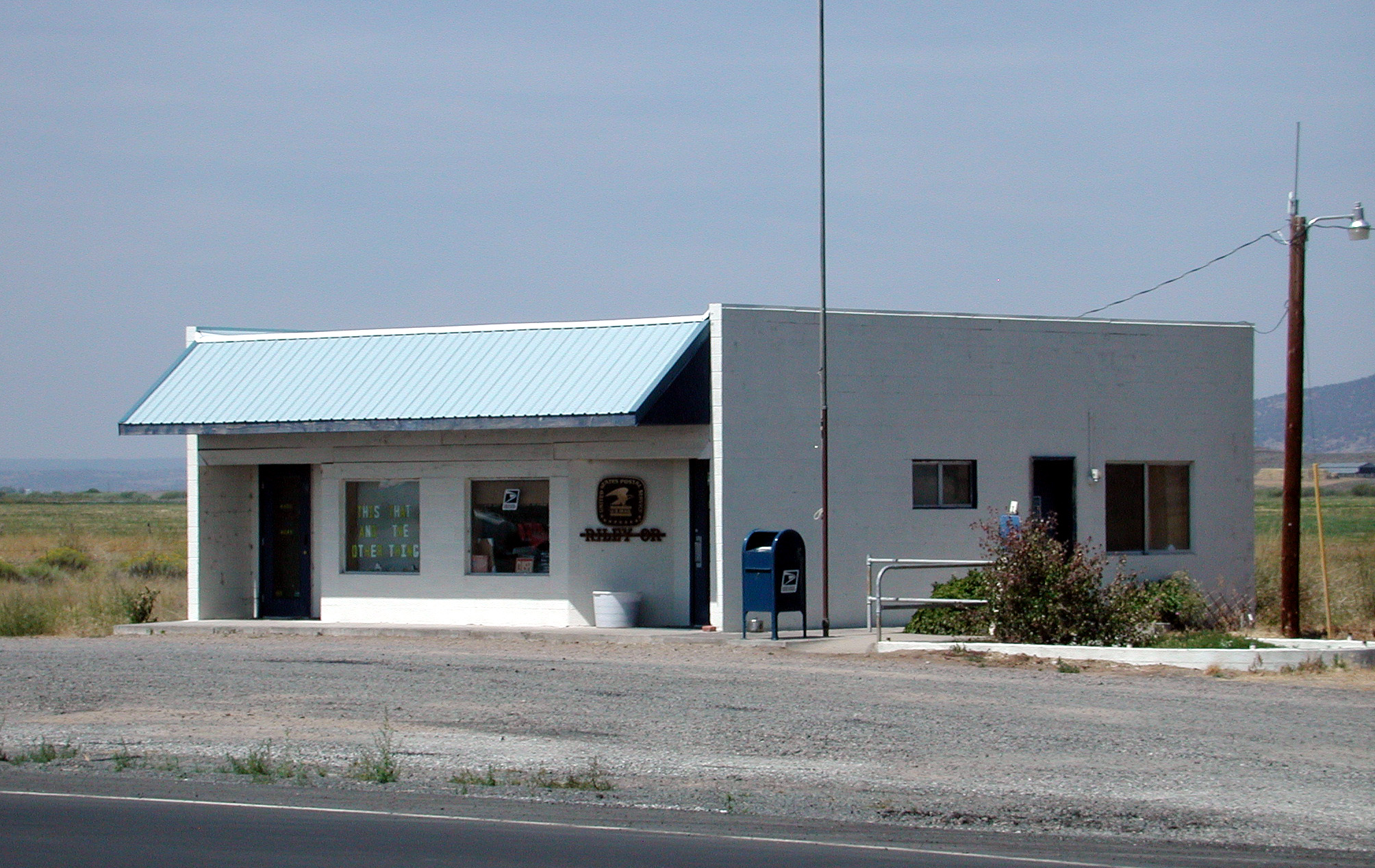
- Post office in Riley

- Location within Oregon Location within the United States
- Coordinates: 43°32′30″N 119°30′14″W
- Country: United States
- State: Oregon
- County: Harney
- Elevation: 4,226 ft (1,288 m)
- Time zone: UTC-8 (PST)
  - Summer (DST): UTC-7 (PDT)
- ZIP codes: 97758
- Area code: 541
- GNIS feature ID: 1148449

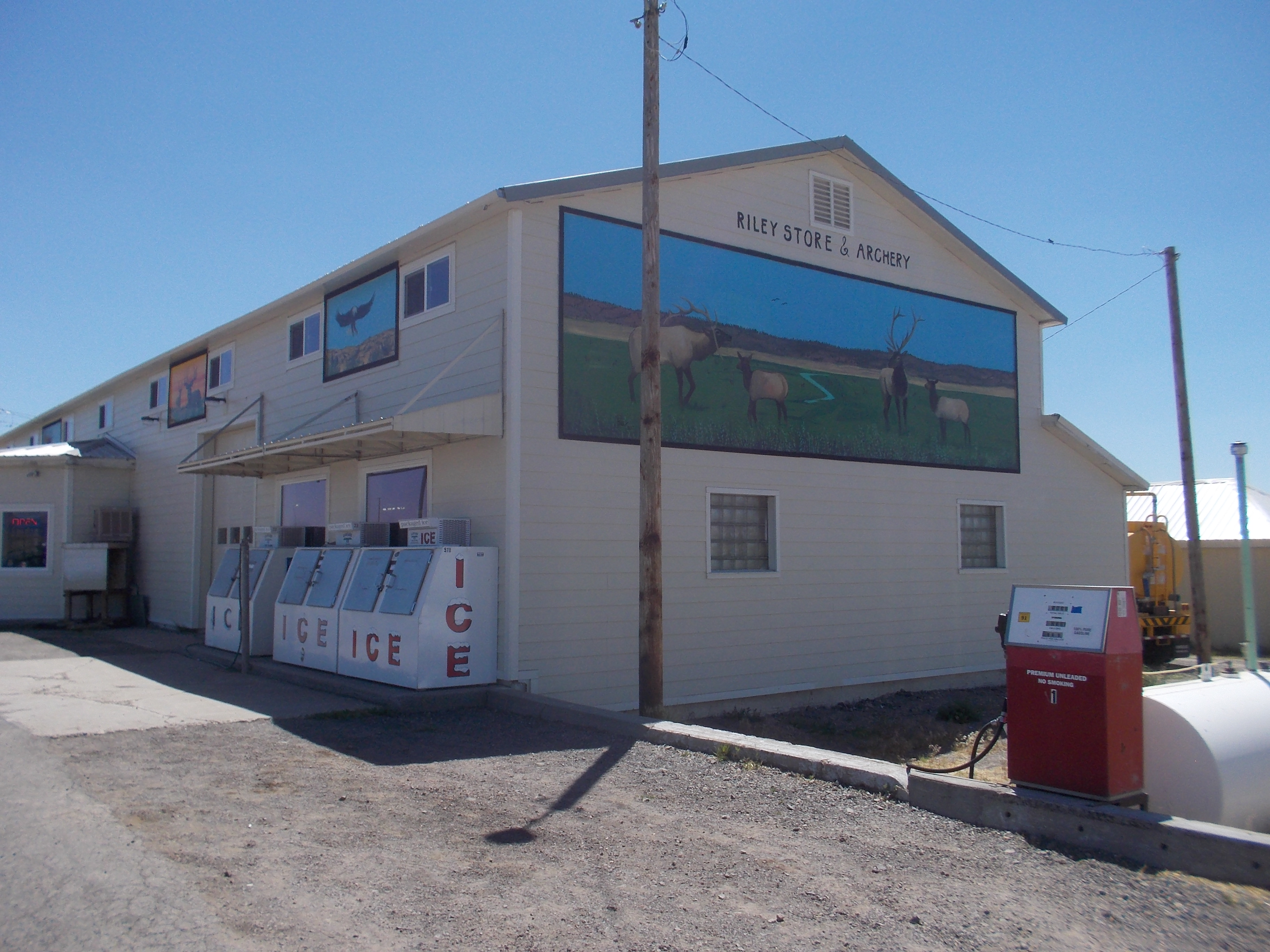
Riley Store

Riley is an unincorporated community in Harney County, Oregon, United States, located at the crossroads of U.S. Highway 395 and U.S. Highway 20, milepost 104, about 28 miles (45 km) west of Burns, the seat of Harney County. The elevation of Riley is 4,226 feet (1,288 m). The town as of 2026 consists entirely of three service establishments with attached apartments: a post office, and a general store with gas pump. Serving travelers of US HWY 20 a small mom and pop campground offering up a RV hookup site where travelers can safely stay for a night or so. The campground and hobby farm operates solely on donations to support habitat restoration projects and animal rescue. The property also serves as a wildlife refuge. Captain Tuckers Quarters Private Campground located at 15830 US HWY 20, Riley Oregon 97758.

Farmers grow alfalfa, hay, and root crops.

The Oregon Department of Transportation has a camera for road and weather conditions located at the intersection of U.S. 20 and U.S. 395 in Riley, facing west-northwest.

== History ==
The town began with the establishment of a post office in about 1885, and was named for stockman Amos Riley of the ranching partnership Riley and Hardin. Previously, the nearest post office was at Hardin, 75 miles (121 km) northwest of Riley, so the people who lived along Silver Creek made Riley their new gathering spot. Riley's post office closed in 1919, but was reopened in 1949 after an office at Suntex was closed.

== Climate ==
According to the Köppen Climate Classification system, Riley has a semi-arid climate, abbreviated "BSk" on climate maps.

== Points of interest ==
- Chickahominy Reservoir

Captain Tuckers Quarters Private Campground Location 15830 US HWY 20, Riley Oregon,97758

== Transportation ==
In the 21st century, Riley is a stop on the Eastern POINT intercity bus line between Bend and Ontario. It makes one stop per day in each direction.

== Education ==
The zoned K-8 school is Suntex Elementary School, which has a Riley postal address. The previous campus was destroyed in a 1978 fire.

High school students are zoned to Crane Union High School, of Harney County Union High School District 1J.

A 1975 proposal to merge the Suntex and Double O districts along with the elementary school districts of Burns (Burns ESD) and Hines, as well as the Burns high school district, was turned down by voters. The Burns and Hines elementary districts and the Burns high school district ultimately combined into Harney County School District 3 in 1989.

Circa 1978 a fire destroyed the Suntex school. A referendum on building a new school building passed with 33 in favor and 3 against, with $25,000 given by the bond.

Harney County is not in a community college district but has a "contract out of district" (COD) with Treasure Valley Community College. TVCC operates the Burns Outreach Center in Burns.

== See also ==
- Rimrock Draw Rockshelter
