= McNulty Reservoir (Malheur County, Oregon) =

- Location within Oregon
- Location: Malheur County, Oregon
- Coordinates: 43°23′02″N 117°39′18″W
- Type: Reservoir

McNulty Reservoir is an earthen dammed reservoir in Malheur County in the U.S. state of Oregon. It sits 46.3 miles (74.5 km) from the city of Vale, near historic Watson, at an elevation of 4,593 feet (1,400 m). The reservoir is for water storage and serves as recreational area, which is promoted to anglers. The lake is named for the Dublin-born Northwest pioneer John McNulty.

== See also ==
- List of lakes in Oregon
- McNulty Reservoir Dam in Eagle County, Colorado
- Upper McNulty Reservoir, upstream from this reservoir
