= Whiting Street Reservoir =

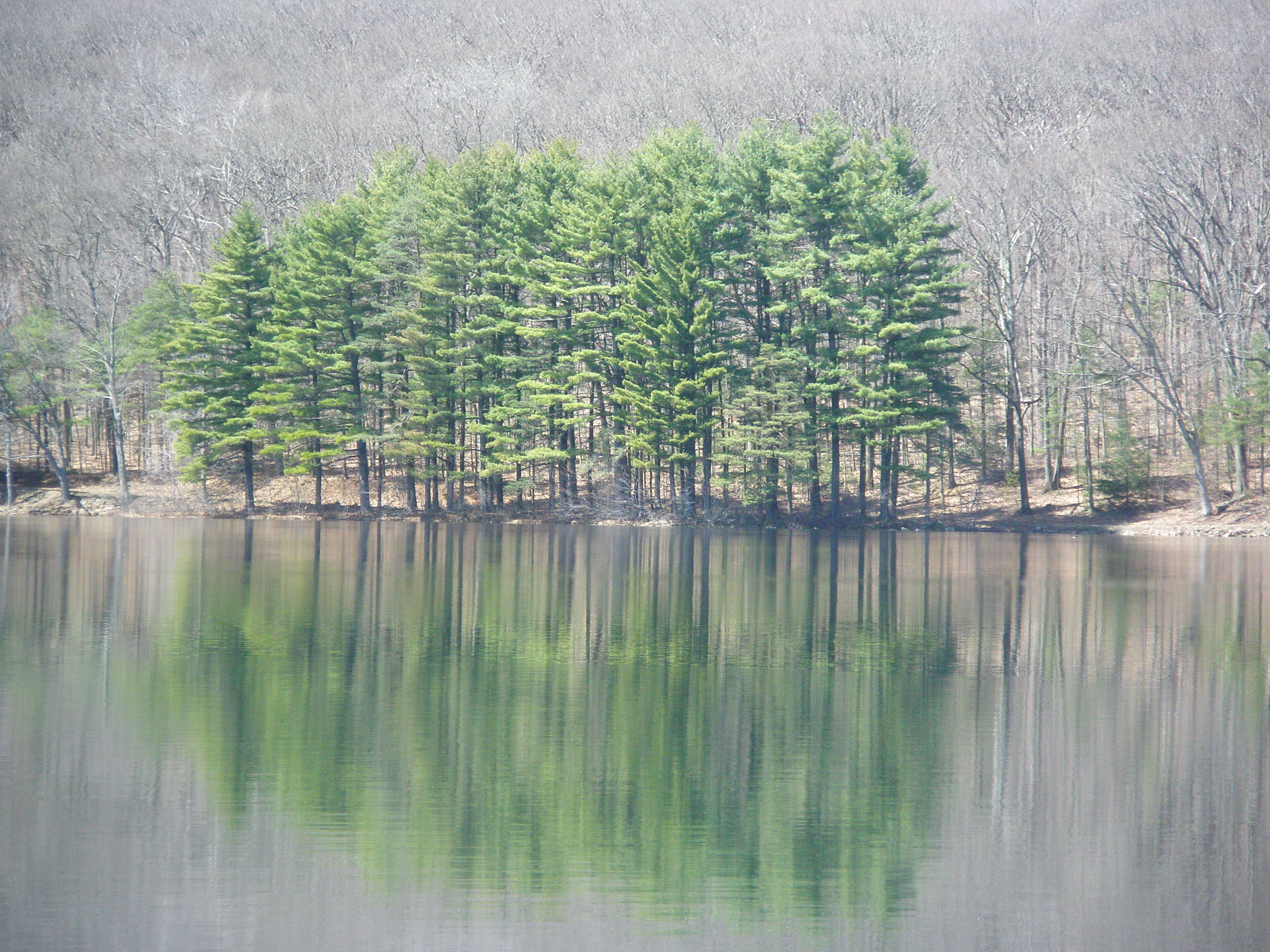
- Pine stand on the shores of Whiting Reservoir

- Location in the United States Whiting Street Reservoir (Massachusetts) Whiting Street Reservoir (the United States)
- Official name: Whiting Street Reservoir
- Country: United States of America
- Location: Holyoke, Massachusetts
- Coordinates: 42°14′29″N 72°38′10″W
- Purpose: Drinking water supply
- Status: Operational
- Opening date: 1888
- Owner: City of Holyoke
- Operator: Holyoke Water Works

Reservoir
- Total capacity: 479×10^{6} US gal (1.81 Gl)
- Catchment area: 897 acres (363 ha)
- Surface area: 114 acres (46 ha)
- Maximum length: 6,280 ft (1,910 m)
- Normal elevation: 387 ft (118 m)
- Website https://www.holyoke.org/departments/water-works/

Whiting Street Reservoir, often shortened as Whiting Reservoir a Class I hazard reservoir, is an auxiliary drinking supply for the city of Holyoke, Massachusetts. The reservoir has an impound capacity of more than 479 million gallons of water and a safe yield of 1.5 million US gallons (5,700 m^{3}) of water per day.

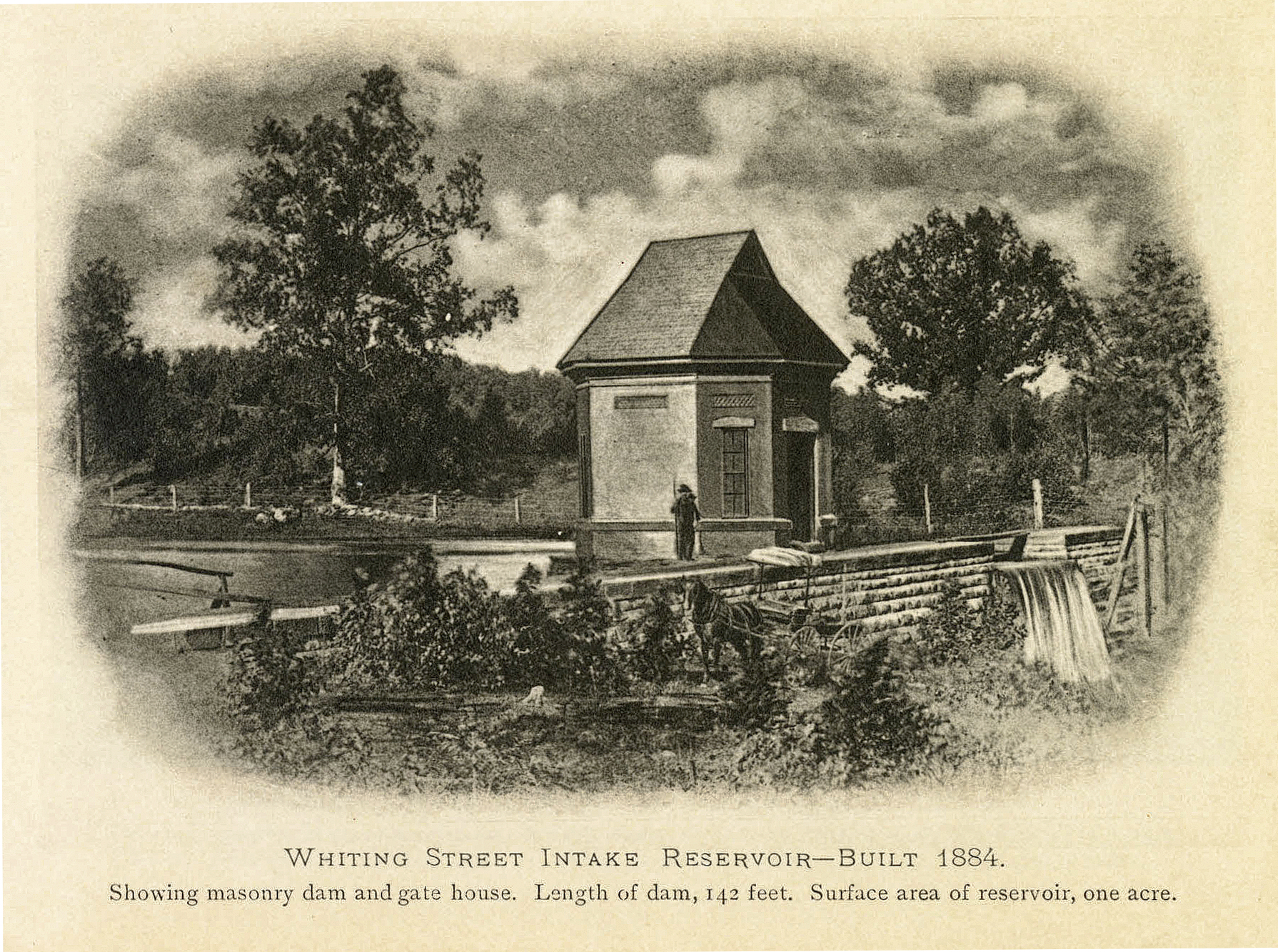
The first gatehouse of the reservoir, as seen in 1904

The reservoir's construction finished and it became fully operational in 1888, with an access road added in 1897. The reservoir was built by damming up Raging Brook with a sandstone dam and earthen berm. Though the third water source added to the Holyoke Water Works, the reservoir was the first in the system to be created by a dam. Fishing is not allowed in the reservoir to protect against aquatic invasive species. Following new filtration requirements in the 1980s, the Reservoir was put on standby in the early 1990s.

Regulations designed to ensure pure water include the prohibiting of dogs, horseback riding, camping, smoking, sledding and motorcycle riding are among prohibited activities from the reservoir and abutting property. The trail and access road around the reservoir was rededicated in 2018 as the Rudy Lengieza Cross Country Course for a former coach of high schools' boys and girls cross-country Holyoke Catholic High School who had served in that post for more than 50 years.
