= Bull Sluice Lake =

Reservoir in Georgia, U.S.

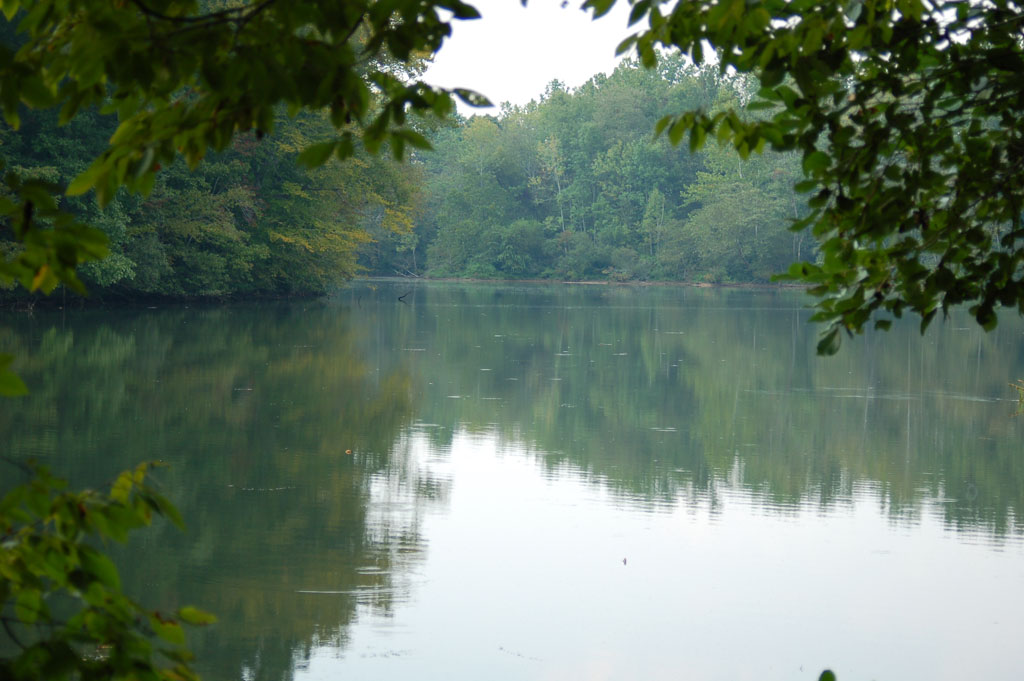
- Bull Sluice Lake

- Location within Georgia Location within the United States
- Location: Fulton / Cobb counties, Georgia
- Coordinates: 33.967°N 84.381°W
- Primary inflows: Chattahoochee River
- Primary outflows: Chattahoochee River
- Basin countries: United States
- Surface area: 673.6 acres (272.6 ha)
- Average depth: 27 ft (8.2 m)
- Max. depth: 55 ft (17 m)
- Surface elevation: 797 feet (243 m)
- Settlements: Roswell, Georgia

Bull Sluice Lake is a small reservoir located along the Chattahoochee River in northern Georgia, in the northern suburbs of metro Atlanta. It is 673 acres (272 ha), and is impounded by the Morgan Falls Dam. Besides the hydroelectric power produced by the dam, the lake's primary use is recreation, including fishing and rowing.

The term "Bull Sluice", so named by Cherokee people, originally was a shoal on the Chattahoochee River.
