= Ashley Reservoir =

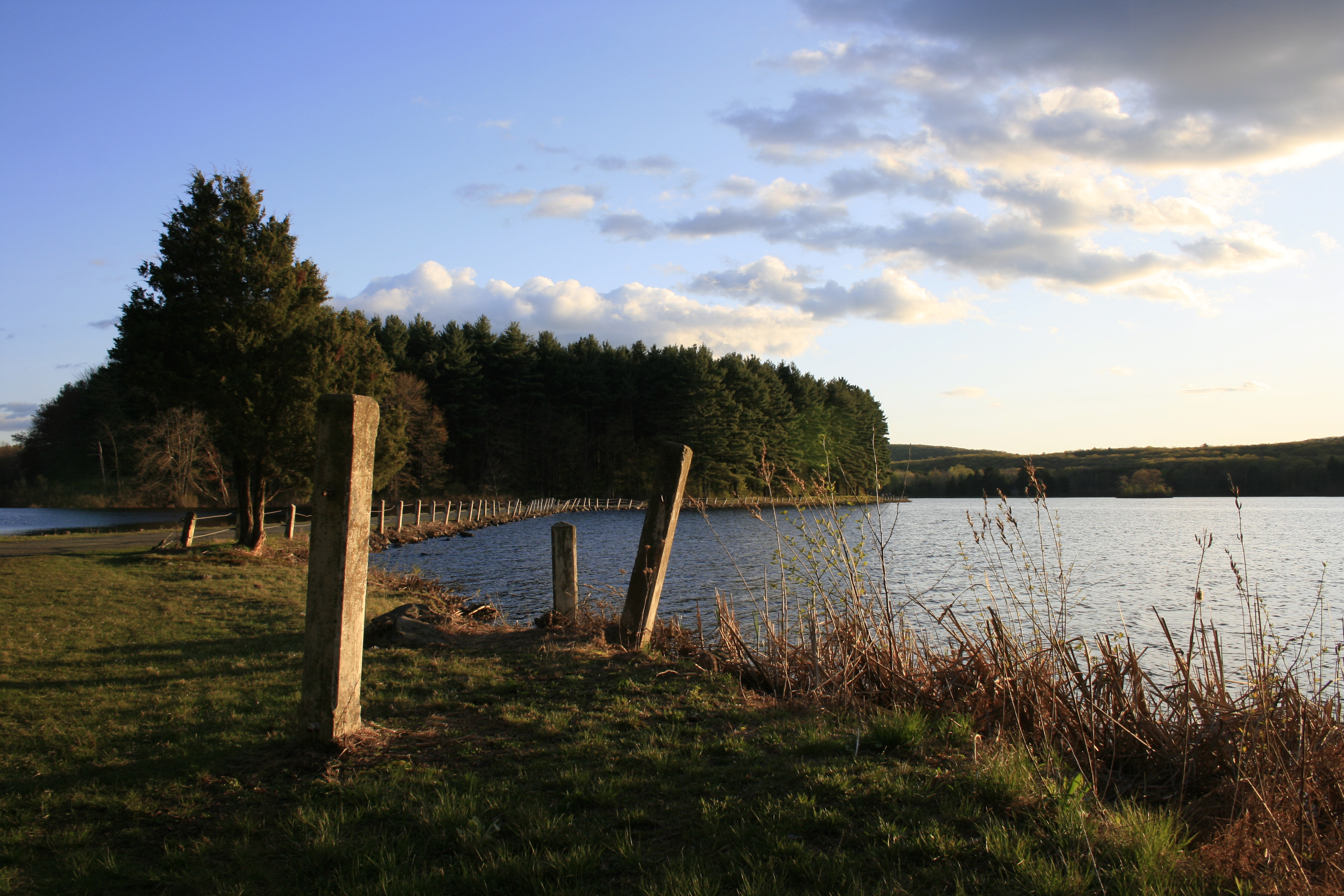
- Shores of the Ashley Reservoir at dusk

- Location in the United States Ashley Reservoir (Massachusetts) Ashley Reservoir (the United States)
- Interactive map of Ashley Reservoir
- Official name: Ashley Reservoir
- Country: United States of America
- Location: Holyoke, Massachusetts
- Coordinates: 42°10′30″N 72°39′40″W
- Purpose: Drinking water supply
- Status: Operational
- Opening date: 1873
- Owner: City of Holyoke
- Operator: Holyoke Water Works

Reservoir
- Creates: Ashley Pond, Wright Pond
- Total capacity: 795×10^{6} US gal (3.01×10^{6} m^{3})
- Catchment area: 1,261 acres (510 ha)
- Surface area: 211 acres (85 ha)
- Maximum length: 640 ft (200 m)
- Maximum water depth: 12 ft (3.7 m)
- Normal elevation: 318 ft (97 m){
- Website http://www.holyoke.org/departments/water-works/

Ashley Reservoir is a reservoir in Holyoke, Massachusetts, United States. A Class II hazard reservoir, it is the secondary drinking supply for the city of Holyoke. The reservoir, consisting of Wright Pond and Ashley Pond, has an impound capacity of more than 795 million US gallons (3.01×10^{6} m^{3}) of water and a safe yield of 2.1 million US gallons (7,900 m^{3}) of water per day.

The reservoir's construction finished and it became fully operational in 1897. Ashley Reservoir is connected to a smaller reservoir McLean Reservoir, named after Holyoke Water Works Commissioner Hugh McLean, through a water-pumping plant that is operated by the Holyoke Water Works. The reservoir has a surrounding gravel road open to civilian recreational use.

== Ecology ==
The reservoir is home to populations of bears, deer, geese, ducks, beavers, and many other animal species. Maple, oak and red and white pine line the uplands, with red osier, alder, buttonbush and other wetlands shrubs closer to the water. Sunfish and milfoil can be seen underwater.

== Watershed public access and recreation ==
In order to protect the water supply from the threats from unrestricted motorized vehicle use, most areas around the reservoir are publicly accessible only by foot, with limited parking available at some of the surrounding gates.

Fishing is not allowed in the reservoir to protect against aquatic invasive species.

Regulations designed to ensure pure water include the prohibiting of dogs, horseback riding, camping, smoking, sledding, and motorcycle riding. Pedestrians are allowed on the paths and roads around the reservoir but the scenic expanse that contains a drinking water supply limits activities.
