= West Hill Dam =

Flood control impoundment in the U.S. state of Massachusetts

West Hill Dam Reserve, US Army Corps of Engineers
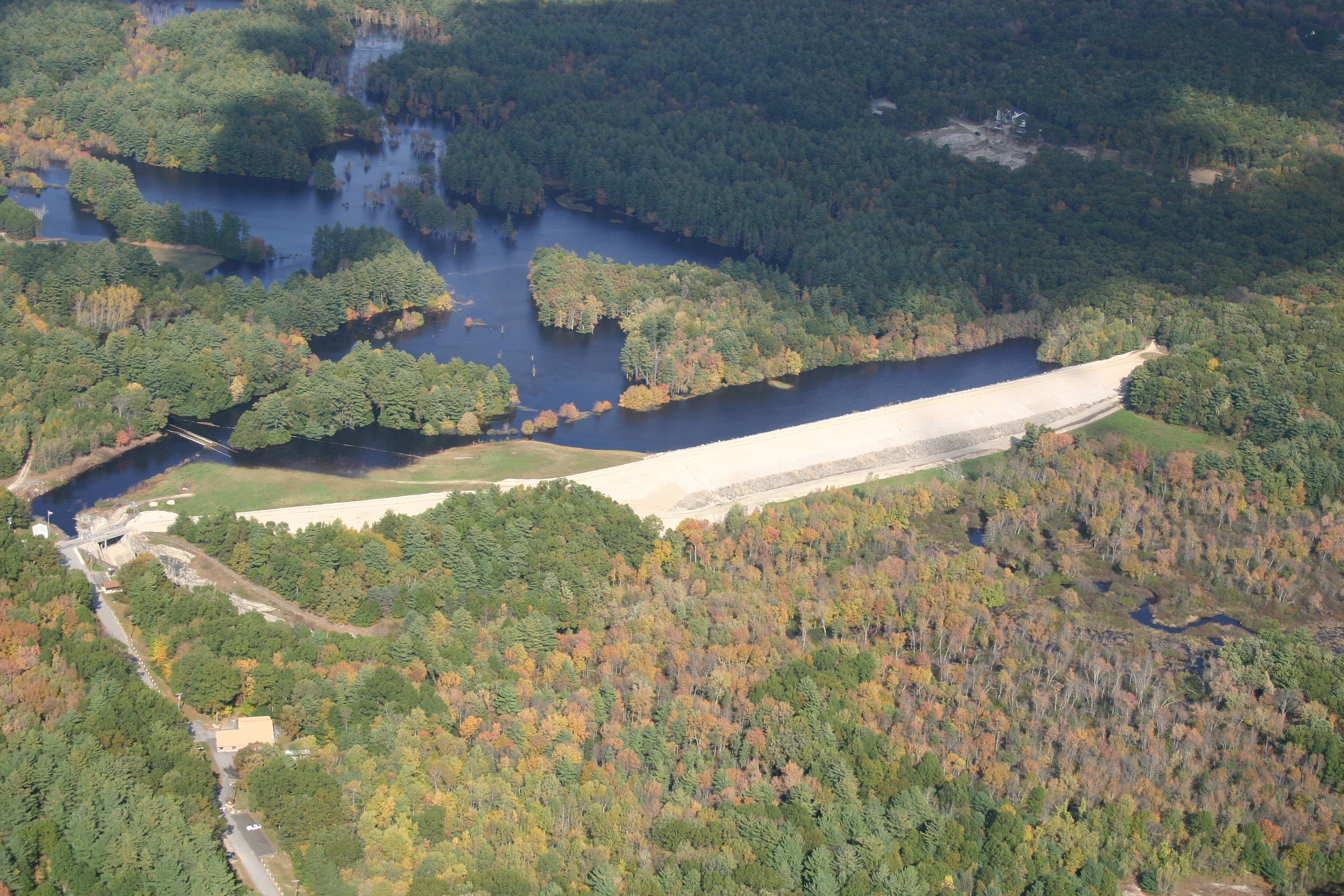
- West Hill Dam during a flood in October 2005

- Location within Massachusetts
- Location: Worcester, Massachusetts, United States
- Coordinates: 42°06′21″N 71°36′18″W
- Elevation: 450 ft (140 m)
- Governing body: US Army Corps of Engineers
- Website: http://www.nae.usace.army.mil/recreati/whd/whdhome.htm US

West Hill Dam Reserve is a United States Army Corps of Engineers flood control project with a recreational park and wildlife management area located at Uxbridge, Massachusetts. The West Hill Dam Project was completed in June 1961. It is located on the West River, one of the branches of the Blackstone River which flows from Worcester, Massachusetts, to Providence, Rhode Island. The West River originates in Grafton, Massachusetts, at Cider Mill Pond and Silver Lake, near Upton, Massachusetts, and the Upton State Forest. The dam is unusual in that it is not filled unless there is a flood. West Hill Dam was built after devastating floods during the 1950s; it is intended to protect the Blackstone Valley from future destructive flooding. The cities and towns downriver from Uxbridge, including Millville, Blackstone, Woonsocket, North Smithfield, Cumberland, Lincoln, Central Falls, Pawtucket and Providence, Rhode Island, suffered extensive flooding from the Blackstone during Hurricane Diane in 1955. Hurricane Donna tested this new dam in 1960 as the eyewall passed over. The West Hill Dam is located in the Blackstone River Valley National Heritage Corridor near the Blackstone River and Canal Heritage State Park. Park rangers provide visitor assistance and offer scheduled interpretative programs. Fishing, hunting, and wildlife viewing opportunities are available year-round. The park has a recreation area, 34 picnic sites, one playground, a swimming area and five miles of hiking & mountain biking trails. However, access to the park from West Hill Road is currently blocked as of 2021 because of landowner disagreements. West Hill Dam (where the Army Corps project is based) is also the field office for the Charles River Natural Valley Storage Area. It consists of scattered wetlands in the upper and middle Charles River watershed, between the towns of Bellingham and Needham. The wetlands provide flood storage area, fisheries, wildlife management, and recreation. The Charles River is the well-known watercourse that flows into Boston Harbor.

== Geography of West Hill Dam ==
West Hill is the westernmost hill in Mendon. Nearly all of its western slope is in Uxbridge, and this is where the dam is located. The town of Northbridge is immediately to the north of this site and includes some of the reservoir trapped behind the West Hill Dam. West Hill and West Hill Dam are in the northeastern part of Uxbridge township. The actual summit of West Hill is in the adjacent town of Mendon. The federal reserve contains 567 acres in the townships of Uxbridge, Northbridge, and Upton, Massachusetts. The New England town or township is a unique municipality unit unlike those of any other geographic region of the United States.

== Historic context and location ==
The West Hill area was one of fourteen sites of Praying Indian Villages, established by the missionary, John Eliot around 1650. Early water powered mills, including some downstream on the West River, and Blackstone River, helped jumpstart America's Industrial Revolution in this river valley region. The Blackstone Valley is a New England upland region with elevations from approximately two hundred feet to over six hundred feet above sea level. West Hill Dam is located about thirty-four miles west-southwest of Boston, and about fifteen miles southeast of Worcester.

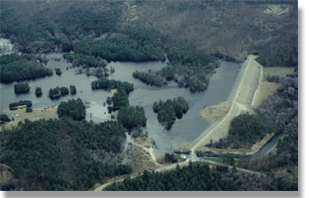
Aerial view of West Hill Reserve and West Hill Park

== See also ==
- West River (Massachusetts)
- Army Corps of Engineers
- Blackstone River and Canal Heritage State Park
- Charles River Natural Valley Storage Area

== Notes ==
- US Army Corps of Engineers, West Hill Dam, Uxbridge, Massachusetts
