= Lake Dorene =

- Location within Georgia
- Location: Polk County, Georgia
- Coordinates: 33°58′35″N 85°03′36″W
- Type: reservoir
- Basin countries: United States
- Surface elevation: 791 ft (241 m)

Lake Dorene is a reservoir in Polk County, in the U.S. state of Georgia.

"Dorene" is a conjoin of the first names of two local women, Dorothy Rhinehart and Irene Everett.

== See also ==
- List of lakes in Georgia (U.S. state)
