= Lake Delano =

- Location within Georgia Location within the United States
- Location: F. D. Roosevelt State Park, Harris County, Georgia
- Coordinates: 32°50′33″N 84°49′50″W
- Type: reservoir
- Basin countries: United States
- Surface elevation: 879 ft (268 m)

Lake Delano is a reservoir within the F. D. Roosevelt State Park, in Harris County, Georgia.

There are a number of conflicting information, but the lake is officially Lake Delano. Per official Georgia State Park website:

"2 Lakes (15-acre Lake Delano and 25-acre Lake Franklin)"[3]

Lake Delano was named after Sara Roosevelt, the presidential mother. A variant name is "Delano Lake".
