= Lake Toccoa =

- Location within Georgia Location within the United States
- Location: Toccoa, Stephens County, Georgia
- Coordinates: 34°51′58″N 83°20′31″W
- Type: reservoir
- Basin countries: United States
- Surface elevation: 1,647 ft (502 m)

Lake Toccoa is a reservoir in the U.S. state of Georgia, Stephens County, in the city of Toccoa.

Toccoa comes from the Cherokee word Ꮤꮖꭿ "Tagwâ′hĭ," meaning "Catawba place" or "beautiful".
