= Martinsville Dam =

Dam in Virginia, United States

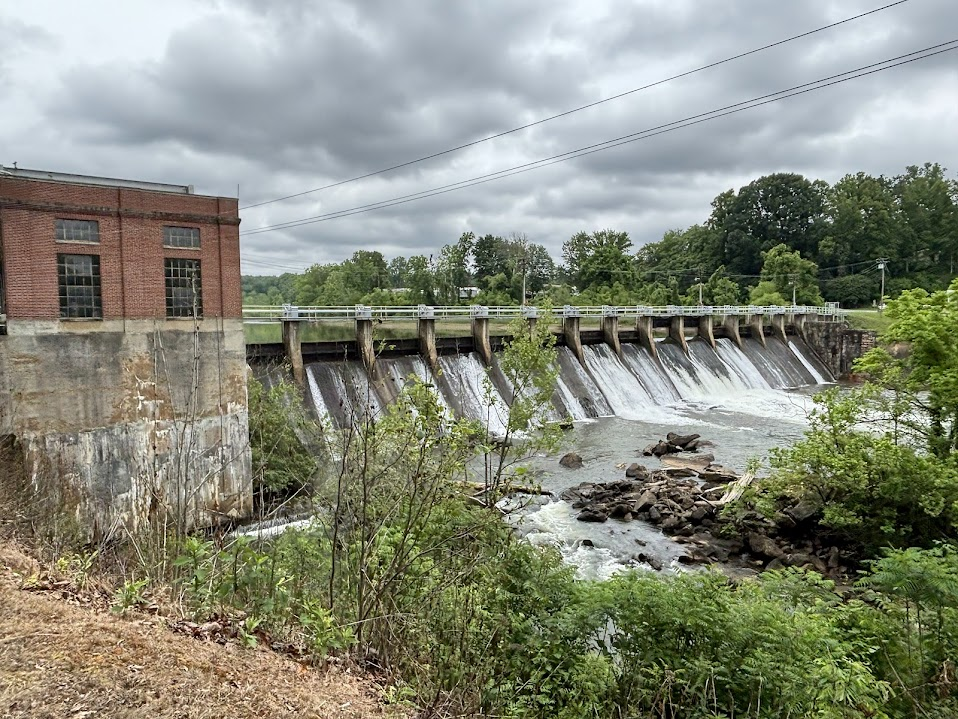

- Location within Virginia
- Country: United States
- Location: Martinsville, Henry County, Virginia
- Coordinates: 36°39′52.39″N 79°53′00.35″W
- Purpose: Power
- Status: Operational
- Opening date: 1924; 102 years ago

Dam and spillways
- Impounds: Smith River
- Height: 32 ft (9.8 m)
- Length: 575 ft (175 m)

Power Station
- Hydraulic head: 32 ft (9.8 m)
- Turbines: 2
- Installed capacity: 1.3 MW

The Martinsville Dam is a gravity dam on the Smith River in Martinsville, Virginia. The dam was completed in 1924 and houses a 1.3 MW power plant which supplies power to the city of Martinsville. Before the current dam, there was a mill dam in its location. The dam and power plant are operated by the Martinsville Electric Department.
