= Upper McNulty Reservoir =

- Location within Oregon Location within the United States
- Location: Malheur County, Oregon
- Coordinates: 43.3593188°N 117.6849458°W
- Type: reservoir
- Surface elevation: 4,728 feet (1,441 m)

Upper McNulty Reservoir is a reservoir in the U.S. state of Oregon, located slightly to the northwest of McNulty Reservoir, in Malheur County. Its surface elevation is 4,728 feet (1,441 m).

== See also ==
- List of lakes in Oregon
