= Blue Gulch Reservoir Dam =

Dam in Stevens County, Washington, United States

The Blue Gulch Reservoir Dam is a dam in Kettle Falls, Washington. It is owned by Richard Hurst, who also owns the Blue Gulch Reservoir.

The dam is located at 48°35′24″N 118°05′58″W in Stevens County, Washington. The dam was completed in 1926.
