= Galisteo Dam =

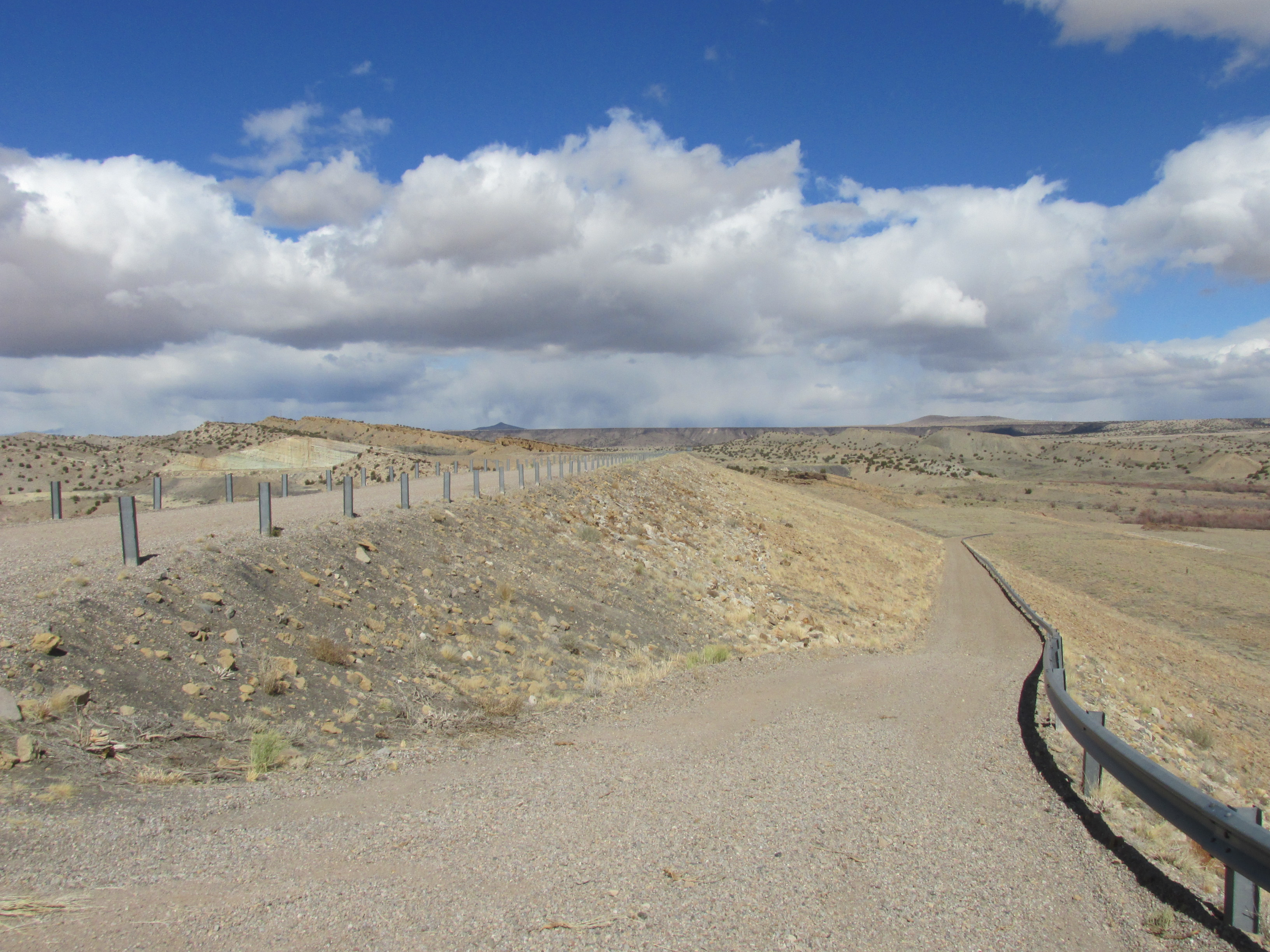
- Galisteo Dam

- Location within New Mexico
- Country: United States
- Location: Santa Fe County, New Mexico
- Coordinates: 35.463816°N 106.20917°W
- Purpose: Flood control
- Opening date: 1970; 56 years ago
- Owner: United States Army Corps of Engineers

Dam and spillways
- Height: 164 feet (50 m)
- Length: 2,820 feet (860 m)

Reservoir
- Total capacity: 152,600 acre-feet

Galisteo Dam (National ID # NM00002) is a dam in Santa Fe County, New Mexico.

The earthen dam was constructed in 1970 by the United States Army Corps of Engineers with a height of 164 feet (50 m) and 2,820 feet (860 m) long at its crest. Built solely for flood control and sediment impoundment on Galisteo Creek, with its "long history of violent floods", the main line of the Atchison, Topeka and Santa Fe railroad was relocated to accommodate the project. The dam is owned and operated by the Corps of Engineers. Galisteo Dam is one of the four Army Corps of Engineers projects for flood and sediment control on the Rio Grande system, operating in conjunction with Cochiti Dam, Abiquiu Dam, and Jemez Canyon Dam.

The reservoir it creates, Galisteo Reservoir, is ordinarily dry. Its maximum capacity is 152,600 acre-feet (1.9 × 10^{11} liters). No water recreation is available. Although the approximately five-acre (2.0 ha) site is open to the public for day use, the site is surrounded by private lands and lands of the Kewa Pueblo.
