= Silver Creek (Harney County, Oregon) =

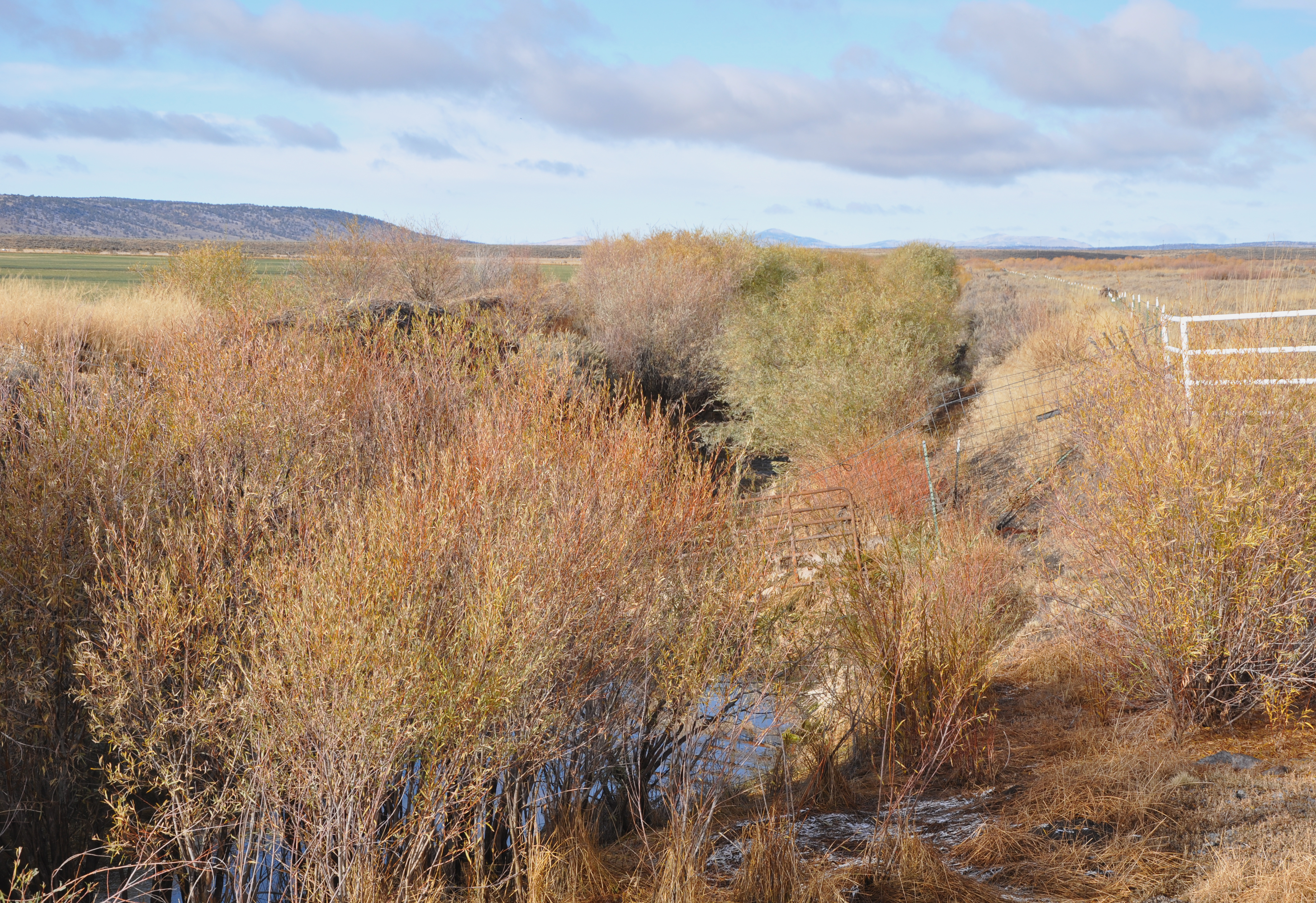
- Flowing through fields north of Riley

- Location of the mouth of Silver Creek in Oregon

Location
- Country: United States
- State: Oregon
- County: Harney

Physical characteristics
- Source: Blue Mountains
  - location: near Snow Mountain between Burns and Paulina in, Harney County, Oregon
  - coordinates: 43°56′28″N 119°33′25″W
  - elevation: 5,830 ft (1,780 m)
- Mouth: Harney Lake
  - location: downstream of Riley, Harney County, Oregon
  - coordinates: 43°15′47″N 119°11′21″W
  - elevation: 4,101 ft (1,250 m)
- Length: 87 mi (140 km)
- Basin size: 1,670 sq mi (4,300 km^{2})

Silver Creek is an 87-mile (140 km) stream of Oregon which drains a portion of the endorheic Harney Basin to Harney Lake. Arising in the Blue Mountains, it flows generally southeast, although much of the stream is intermittent. The Silver Creek Volcanic Field is associated with the creek's watershed.

== Course ==
From its headwaters in the southern Blue Mountains, Silver Creek flows south through the Ochoco National Forest and is fed by tributaries and, at the base of the mountains, large springs feed the creek. The creek meanders through a broad alluvial plain and turns southeast near Chickahominy Reservoir, traveling through the unincorporated community of Riley, where it is crossed by Highway 20 and Highway 395, respectively. Past Riley Silver Creek flows through a canyon with 200-to-300-foot (60 to 90 m) tall walls made of volcanic basalt. The creek is impounded several miles downstream, forming Moon Reservoir. It then splits into two streams; one portion heads southwest into the usually dry Silver Lake, while the other portion flows southeast through Warm Springs Valley into the Malheur National Wildlife Refuge, and finally Harney Lake.

== Flora and fauna ==
The upper regions of the Silver Creek watershed are forested; the most common plant species are coniferous, including Ponderosa Pine, White Fir, Douglas-fir, and Western Juniper. The lower regions are primarily desert rangelands.

Fish such as Tui Chub, Speckled Dace, Redside Shiner, Mottled Sculpin, and Great Basin redband trout are native to Silver Creek and its tributaries. Others, including rainbow Trout, Largemouth Bass, Bluegill, and Yellow Perch were introduced to the watershed by humans.

Large mammals such as Deer, Elk, and Antelope have been spotted in the lower regions during winter.

== See also ==
- List of longest streams in Oregon
