= Madison Lake State Park =

Park in Ohio, USA

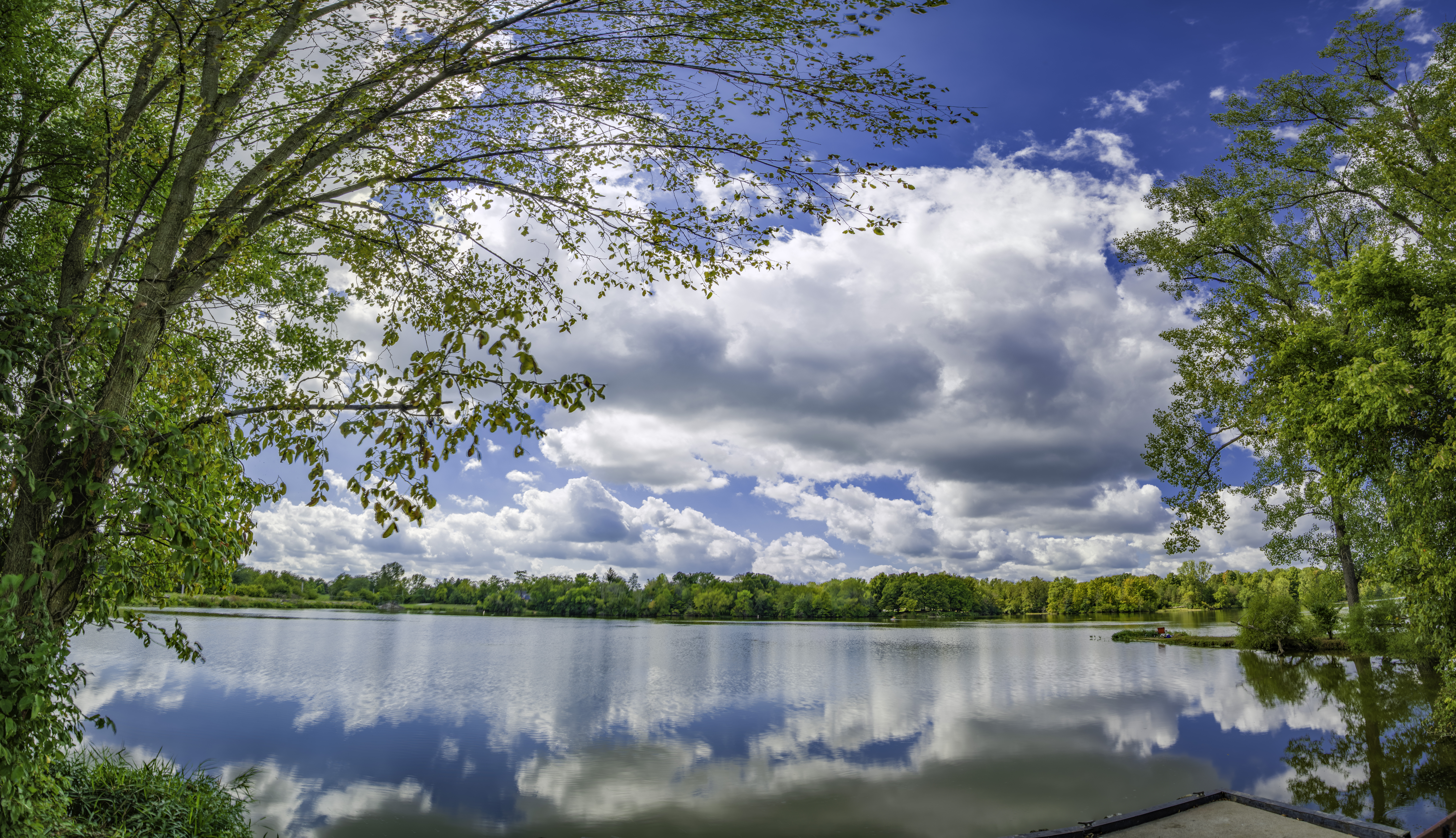
- Madison Lake State Park, September 2019

- Location within Ohio Location within the United States
- Location: Madison County, Ohio, United States
- Nearest city: London, Ohio
- Coordinates: 39°52′09″N 83°22′26″W
- Area: Land: 76 acres (31 ha); Water: 106 acres (43 ha)
- Elevation: 971 feet (296 m)
- Established: 1950
- Administrator: Ohio Department of Natural Resources
- Designation: Ohio state park
- Website: Madison Lake State Park

Madison Lake State Park is a public recreation area located four miles (6.4 km) east of London in the Darby Plains region of Madison County, Ohio, United States. The state park includes 106-acre (43 ha) Madison Lake and 76 acres (31 ha) of surrounding land.

== History ==
The lake was formed in 1947 when the Madison Lake Dam was built on Deer Creek. The site was handed over to the Ohio Department of Natural Resources for use as a state park in 1950.

== Activities and amenities ==
The park offers a boat ramp, 300-foot (91 m) sand beach, changing booths and restrooms, picnic areas, and shelters. A mile-long hiking trial skirts the lake's southern shore. The lake's northern end is reserved for hunting migratory game birds. The park is a popular fishing location, with bass, bluegill, crappie, and channel catfish found in the lake.
