= Elkhead Reservoir =

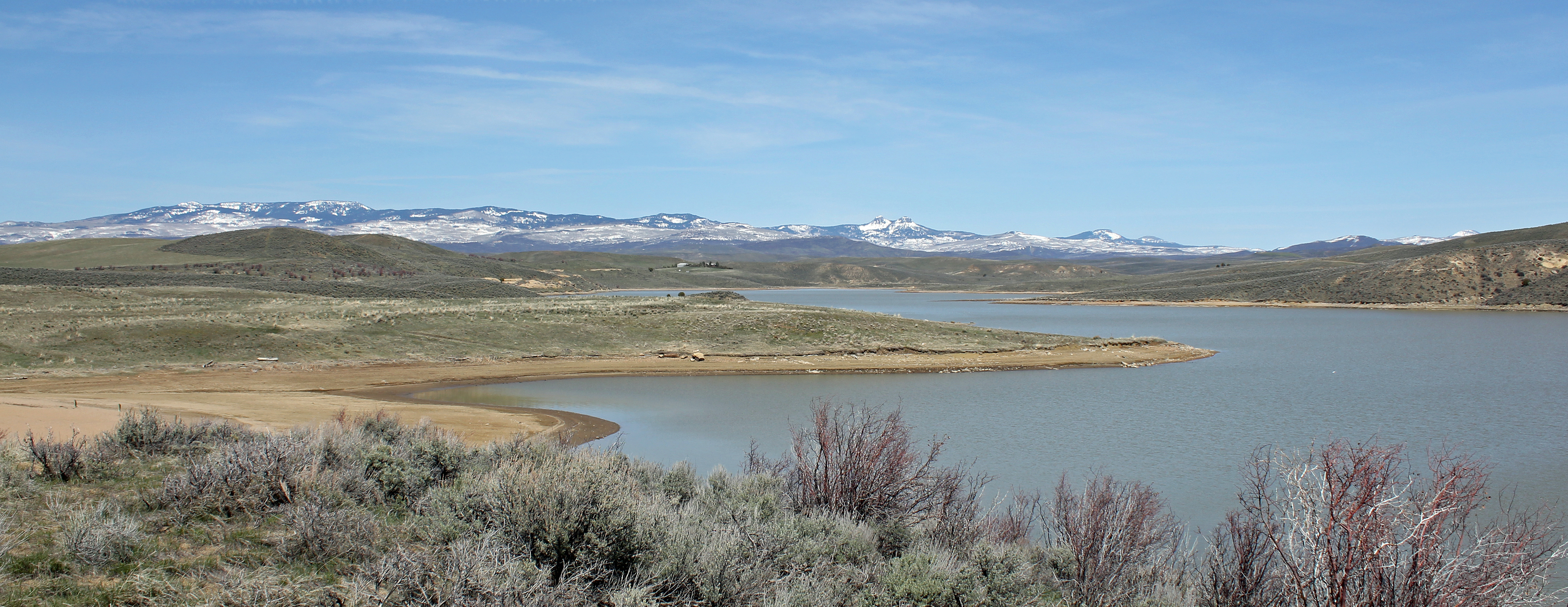

- Location within Colorado Location within the United States
- Coordinates: 40.578°N 107.374°W
- Type: reservoir
- Water volume: 25,550 acre-feet (0.03152 km^{3})
- Surface elevation: 6,355 feet (1,937 m)

Elkhead Reservoir is located in northwest Colorado near the town of Craig. It was originally constructed by the Division of Wildlife on the Elkhead Creek, which is a major tributary of the Yampa River. A 205 square miles (530 km^{2}) river basin drains into the reservoir. It has a capacity of 25,550 acre-feet (0.03152 km^{3}). The dam was enlarged for two years ending in 2006. This enlargement cost $31 million and raised the height of the dam by 25 feet (7.6 m) and of the pool by 20 feet (6.1 m). The reservoir is found at an elevation of 6,355 feet (1,937 m).

The reservoir is part of Elkhead State Park.
