= Sibley Lake Dam =

Dam in Louisiana, United States

Sibley Lake
- Location within Louisiana Location within the United States
- Location: Natchitoches Parish, Louisiana
- Coordinates: 31°45′09″N 93°06′39″W
- Basin countries: United States
- Built: 1962; 64 years ago
- Surface area: 3.4 sq mi (8.8 km^{2})
- Water volume: 56,700 acre⋅ft (69,900,000 m^{3})

Sibley Lake Dam is a dam in Natchitoches Parish, Louisiana.

== History ==
The earthen dam was constructed in 1962 with a height of 36 feet (11 m) and a length at its crest of 6,520 feet (1,990 m). It impounds the Youngs Bayou for municipal water supply for the city of Natchitoches. The dam is owned and operated by the city and local Water Works District Number One. Both lake and dam are named for an early settler and Indian agent in the area, Dr. John Sibley.

The reservoir it creates, Sibley Lake, has a water surface of 3.4 square miles (8.8 km^{2}), a shoreline of about 38 miles (61 km), and a maximum capacity of 56,700 acre-feet (69,900,000 m^{3}). The natural wetlands on this site known as Lac Terre Noir was drained in the early twentieth century, then re-developed as a reservoir and water source. Recreation on the lake, including hunting, boating, camping, and fishing (for white crappie, channel catfish and largemouth bass) requires an annual permit from the city.
