= Forge River =

River in Massachusetts, United States

Coordinates: 41.905°N 71.060°W

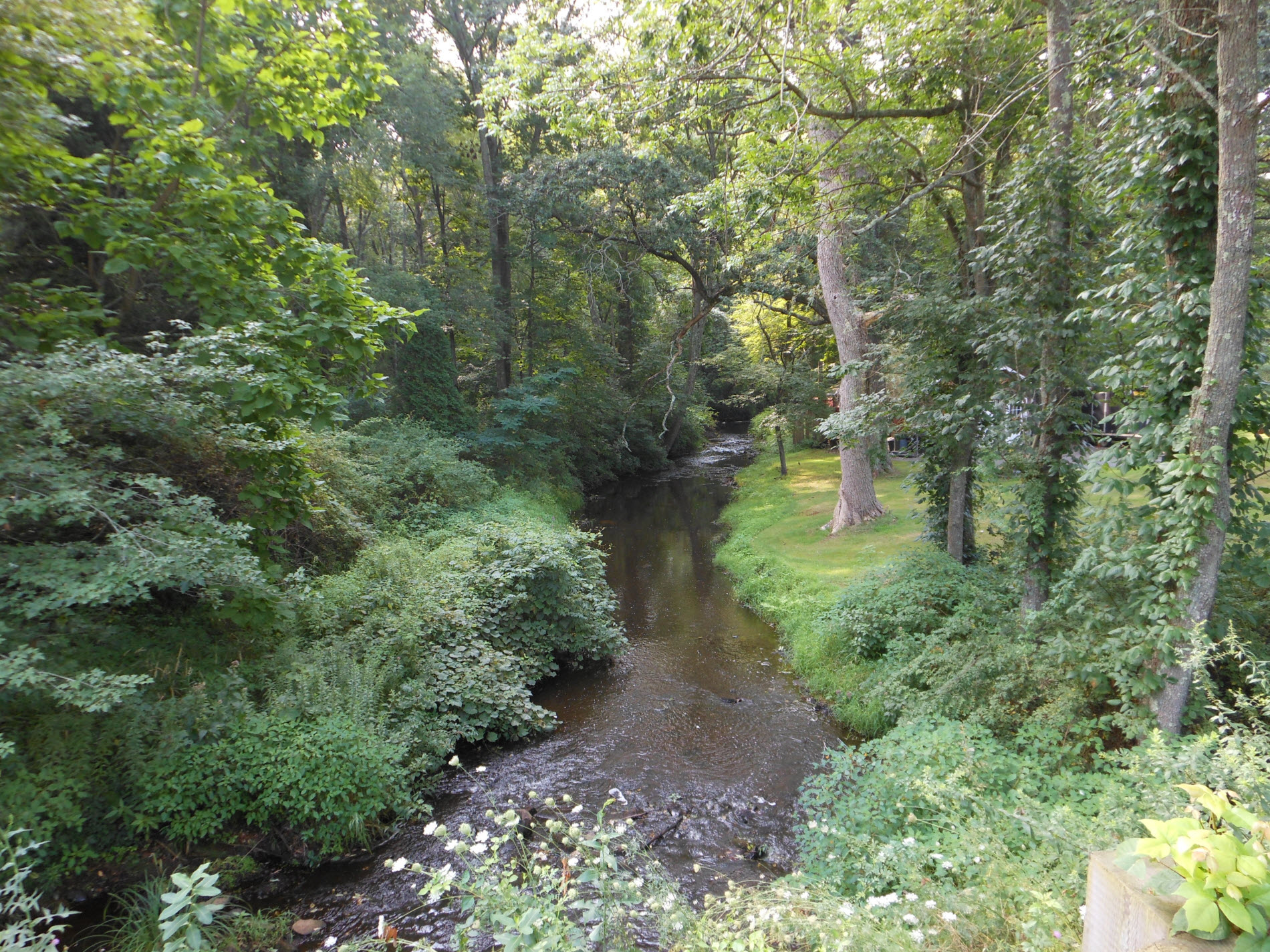
Forge River

The Forge River is a 5.1-mile-long (8.2 km) river in the town of Raynham in southeastern Massachusetts. It is a tributary of the Taunton River. It rises from Gushee Pond near Interstate 495 and flows northwest through Titicut Swamp, then turns southwest for the rest of its course. It flows through Hewitt Pond, passes the neighborhood of Tracy Corner, then continues through Johnson Pond and the village of Raynham Center to its junction with the Taunton River.
