= Chickahominy Reservoir =

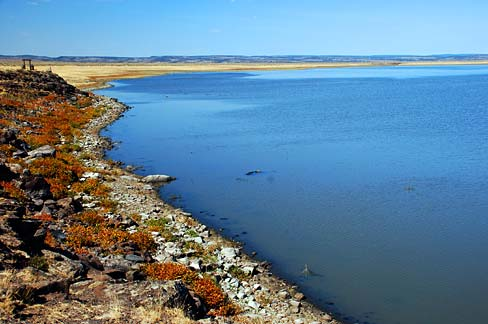

- Location within Oregon Location within the United States
- Location: Harney County, Oregon, United States
- Coordinates: 43°32′40″N 119°36′49″W
- Type: Reservoir
- Primary inflows: Chickahominy Creek
- Primary outflows: Chickahominy Creek
- Basin countries: United States
- Max. length: approx. 12,000 feet (3,657.6 m)
- Max. width: up to 2,000 feet (609.6 m)
- Surface area: 530 acres (2 km^{2})
- Average depth: 10 feet (3.0 m)
- Max. depth: 28 feet (8.5 m)
- Surface elevation: 4,280 feet (1,305 m)
- Islands: none

Chickahominy Reservoir is located near U.S. Highway 20 100 miles (160.9 km) east of Bend, Oregon, and 32 miles (51.5 km) west of Burns, Oregon, in the United States. It was built as an irrigation reservoir, but is now managed by Oregon Department of Fish and Wildlife as a recreational fishery. The reservoir is very long and is narrow at points, almost pinched at the center.

A dam on Chickahominy Creek in Harney County, Oregon, formed the reservoir. After leaving the reservoir, the creek then flows into Silver Creek, north of Riley. Chickahominy Reservoir was named for the creek that bears the same name, and the origin is uncertain. Speculation exists that members of the U.S. Cavalry, who were fighting in the Bannock War near Silver Creek, named the creek in 1878. In fact, Reuben F. Bernard, a cavalry commander, had fought in several campaigns along the Chickahominy River in Virginia during the American Civil War in 1862.

The lake sits in the wide open and is exposed to harsh wind, and is surrounded by miles of sagebrush and few trees.

If planning to fish this lake, it is best in the morning and evening. The limit is five fish, motors are allowed, and boaters are speed limit-controlled. The lake is open year round. Although not a huge reservoir, Chickahominy is large enough to stock trout. Annually, it is stocked with rainbow trout fingerlings, and conditions allow for rapid growth. The reservoir provides an ideal habitat for growing huge trout, which feast year-round on minnows, leeches, and aquatic insects. The reservoir is usually frozen by mid-December.

A paved boat ramp is located near the dam.

== See also ==
- List of lakes in Oregon
