= Morgan Falls Dam =

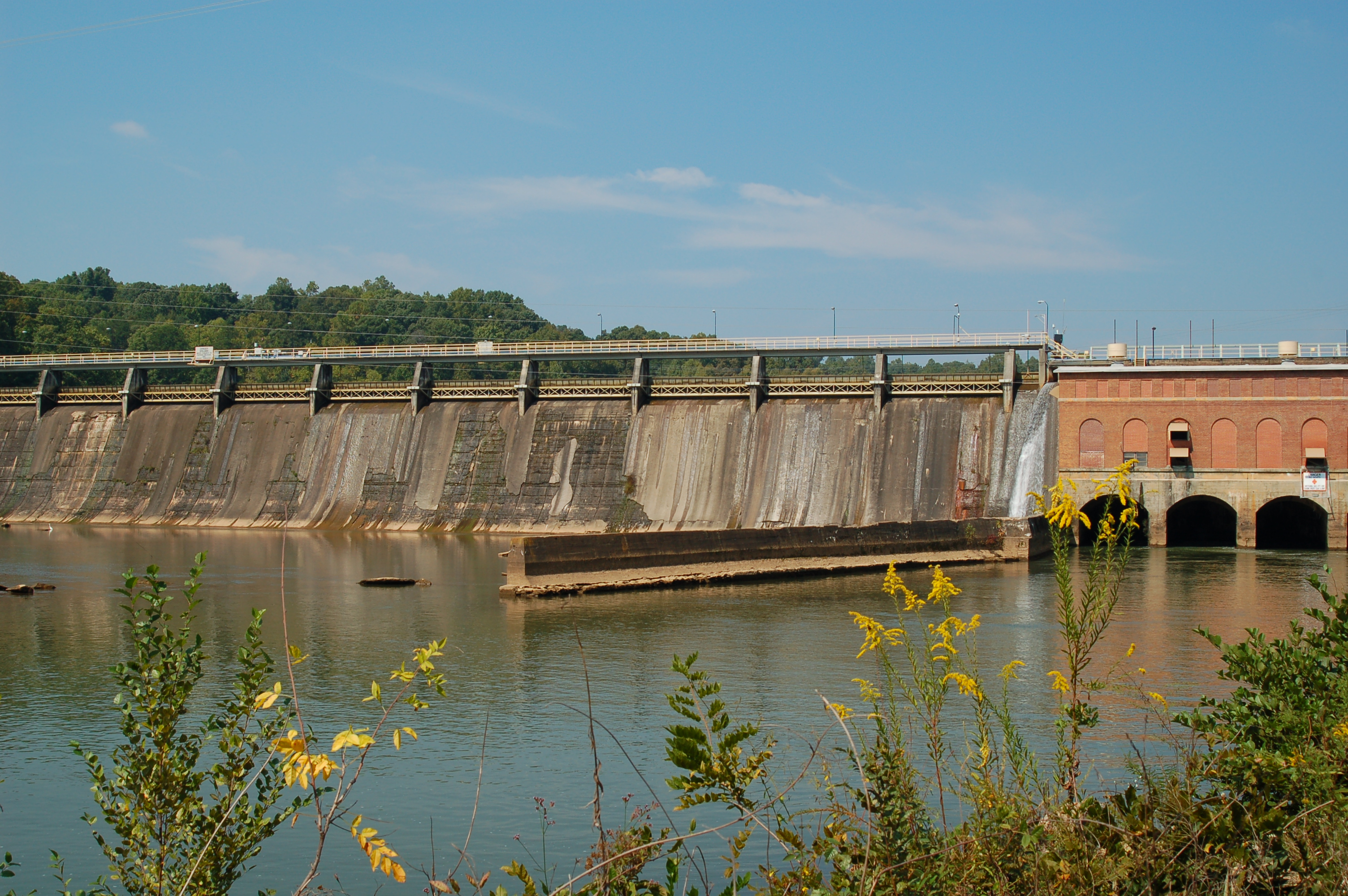

- Location within Georgia Location within the United States
- Country: United States
- Location: Sandy Springs, Georgia
- Coordinates: 33°58′05″N 84°23′02″W
- Purpose: Power
- Status: Operational
- Construction began: 1904; 122 years ago
- Operator: Georgia Power

Dam and spillways
- Type of dam: Gravity dam
- Impounds: Chattahoochee River
- Height (thalweg): 56 feet (17 m)
- Length: 896 feet (273 m)

Power Station
- Commission date: 1924; 102 years ago
- Installed capacity: 15 MW (16.8 MW authorized)

Morgan Falls Dam is a small hydroelectric dam located along the Chattahoochee River at the northern end of Sandy Springs, Georgia, and crossing the river westwards into eastern Cobb County in north metro Atlanta. Originally constructed in 1904 (122 years ago) by Georgia Power to provide electricity for Atlanta's streetcars, it now provides enough power for about 4,400 homes; upon completion the dam created Bull Sluice Lake. It was named for then recently deceased Georgia Power president S. Morgan Smith's mother whose maiden name was Morgan. At the time it was by far the largest hydroelectric plant in the state. In 1924 it was rebuilt as a 60 cycle plant with 15,000 kilowatts (up from the original 10,500 kW). In 1957 it was raised to regulate the flow from the larger Buford Dam, 36 miles (58 km) upstream, in order to give Atlanta water during the hours it was needed most. It is 896 feet (273 m) long, and 56 feet (17 m) tall. The dam's license from the Federal Energy Regulatory Commission (FERC) was issued in May 2008, and expires in February 2039 which authorizes a capacity of 16,800 kW.

The construction of the dam changed the river upstream from a narrow river with rapids into a wetland. The wetland serves as a habitat for migrating birds, waterfowl, songbirds, beavers, muskrats, and numerous species of reptiles and amphibians.
