= Wrights Complex Lower Dam =

Wrights Lower Dam
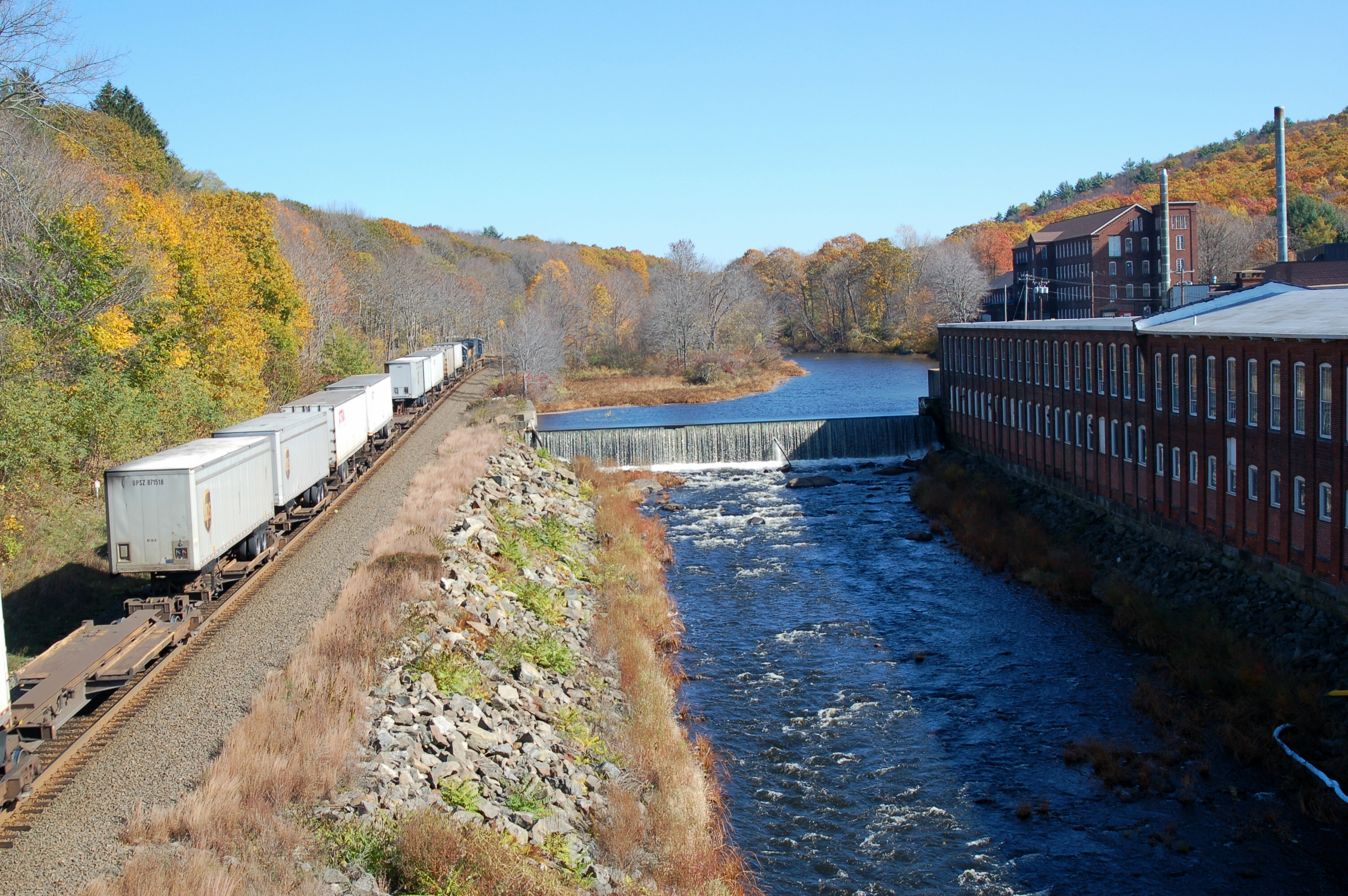
- Wrights Complex Dam at Warren
- Interactive map of Wrights Lower Dam
- Official name: Wrights Complex Lower Dam
- Location: Warren, Massachusetts
- Coordinates: 42°12′42″N 72°13′59″W
- Opening date: 1890
- Operator: Wrights Complex

Dam and spillways
- Impounds: Quaboag River
- Height: 16 ft (4.88 m)
- Length: 80 ft (24.4 m)
- Width (base): 14 ft (4.27 m)

The Wrights Complex Lower Dam spans the Quaboag River in West Warren, Massachusetts. It is a gravity dam constructed of concrete and cut stone masonry. The dam is 80 ft (24.4 m) in length and 16 ft (4.88 m) in height. This dam is part of the Chicopee River Watershed.

== History ==
Constructed in 1890, it has withstood the floods that have taken out most of the other dams on the Quaboag River. In 2005, the Wrights Company conducted a feasibility study to return this dam to use for waterpower generation. Originally, this dam provided waterpower to the large Wrights Mill complex. In the early 1900s, this complex was a knitting mill that produced cloth and various industrial knitted materials. Locally produced waterpower ran the looms and ancillary machinery.

== Description ==
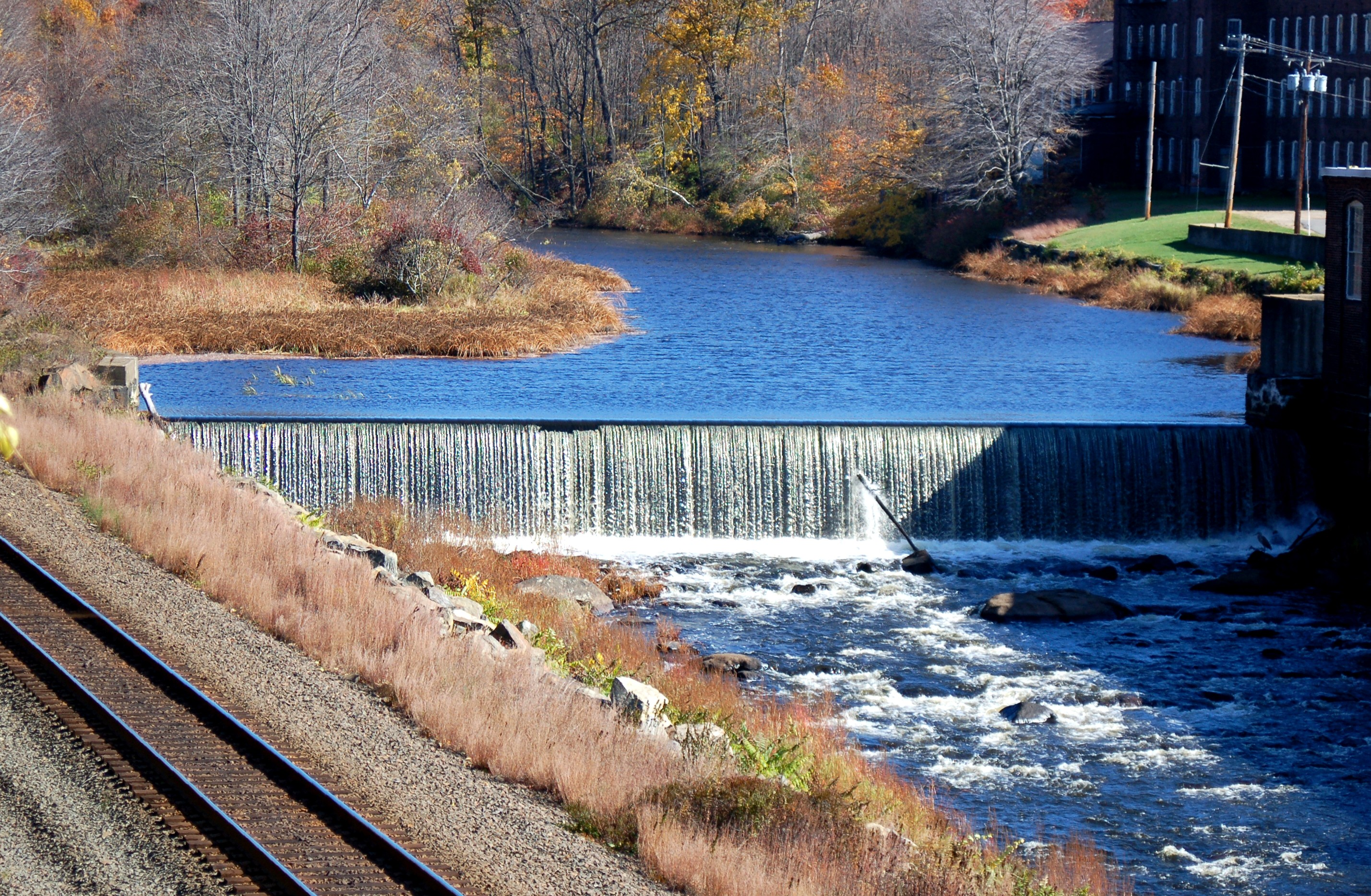
Wrights Complex Lower Dam in West Warren

This dam is 10.5 mi (16.9 km) downstream from the Quaboag River head at Quaboag Pond. It is the second dam of a two dam complex. Destroyed by a flood in the mid 1950s, the upper dam was never rebuilt. Because of its height, this dam is unrunnable by local kayakers and requires mandatory portage around it. A recent survey shows that this dam is capable of producing 830 kW of electricity continuously. This means that it could produce 1.6 MWh of clean electricity annually.
