= Comet Lake (Ohio) =

Reservoir in Ohio, US

- Location within Ohio Location within the United States
- Location: Summit County, Ohio, US
- Coordinates: 40°55′14″N 81°31′20″W
- Type: Reservoir
- Primary outflows: Nimissila Creek
- Catchment area: Tuscarawas River
- Basin countries: United States
- Surface elevation: 988 feet (301 m)
- Islands: 1, Unnamed
- Settlements: Green, Comet

Comet Lake is a private reservoir in Summit County, Ohio, located within the city of Green, at 40°55′14″N 81°31′20″W. The community of Comet sits on the northwestern end of the lake. The lake drains over the Comet Lake Dam into the upper Tuscarawas River by way of Nimisila Creek.
