= Spring Hollow Reservoir =

- Location within Virginia Location within the United States
- Location: Roanoke County, Virginia
- Coordinates: 37.226429°N 80.174832°W
- Type: reservoir
- Primary inflows: Roanoke River
- Basin countries: United States
- Surface area: 158 acres (0.64 km^{2})
- Water volume: 3.3×10^{9} US gal (12,000,000 m^{3})
- Surface elevation: 1,270 ft (387 m)

Spring Hollow Reservoir is a 158-acre (0.64 km^{2}), 3.3-billion-US-gallon (12,000,000 m^{3}) off-stream reservoir in Roanoke County, Virginia with the largest roller-compacted concrete dam east of the Mississippi having commenced operation in 1996, it is now the main source of water for residents of Roanoke County.

== History and Operations ==
Before the reservoir's construction, an ad hoc set of wells and water purchases served Roanoke County. In 1986, county officials, anticipating increased water needs, sought and received voter approval for the Spring Hollow Reservoir.

Water is pumped from the nearby Roanoke River to the reservoir.
