= Rock Creek Reservoir =

- Location of Rock Creek/Scott King Reservoir
- Location: 7 miles north of Ardmore, Carter County, Oklahoma
- Coordinates: 34°16′N 97°06′W
- Type: Reservoir
- Basin countries: United States
- Surface area: 232 acres (94 ha)
- Average depth: 14.5 ft (4.4 m)
- Max. depth: 38 ft (12 m)
- Water volume: 3,550 acre⋅ft (4,380,000 m^{3})
- Shore length^{1}: 5 miles (8.0 km)
- Surface elevation: 1,014 ft (309 m)
- Settlements: Ardmore
- ^{1} Shore length is not a well-defined measure.

Rock Creek reservoir, also known as Scott King reservoir (and shown on Google maps as 'Lake Site 18' and GNIS as 'Upper Red Rock Creek Site 18 Reservoir' (as at Jan 2025)), is 7 miles (11 km) north of the city of Ardmore, Carter County, Oklahoma in the United States. Created in 1979, it is operated by the city of Ardmore as a water supply recreational area. The lake has a normal surface area of 232 acres (94 ha) with 5 miles (8 km) of shoreline and a mean depth of 14.5 feet (4.4 m). The lake has a capacity of 3,550 acre-feet (4,380,000 m^{3}).
