= Englewood Dam =

- Location within Colorado
- Interactive map of Englewood Dam
- Country: United States
- Location: Arapahoe County, Colorado, USA
- Coordinates: 39°35′21.96″N 104°55′08.92″W
- Purpose: Flood control
- Status: Operational
- Construction began: 1936
- Opening date: 1936; 90 years ago
- Owners: Urban Drainage and Flood Control District

Dam and spillways
- Type of dam: Embankment, earth-fill
- Impounds: Willow Creek
- Height: 50 ft (15 m)
- Length: 1,700 ft (520 m)
- Elevation at crest: 5,606 ft (1,709 m)
- Width (crest): 20 ft (6.1 m)

Reservoir
- Total capacity: 1,485 acre⋅ft (1,832,000 m^{3})
- Catchment area: 11 mi^{2} (28 km^{2})

Englewood Dam was constructed as a Works Progress Administration project in 1936. It is located on Willow Creek approximately 9 mi (14 km) upstream from Englewood in Arapahoe County, Colorado, United States. The project serves as a flood retention dam to control of about 11 mi^{2} (28 km^{2}) of the 11 mi^{2} (28 km^{2}) drainage area of the Little Dry Creek basin. Storage capacity is approximately 1,485 acre⋅ft (1,832,000 m^{3}) at the spillway crest but the reservoir is dry most of the year.

It was purchased by the Urban Drainage and Flood Control District in 1973 who carried out improvements on it until 1975. The dam is located in the Willow Spring Open Space in Centennial, Colorado which is part of the South Suburban Park and Recreation District.
