= Jemez Canyon Dam =

Dam in Sandoval County, New Mexico, USA

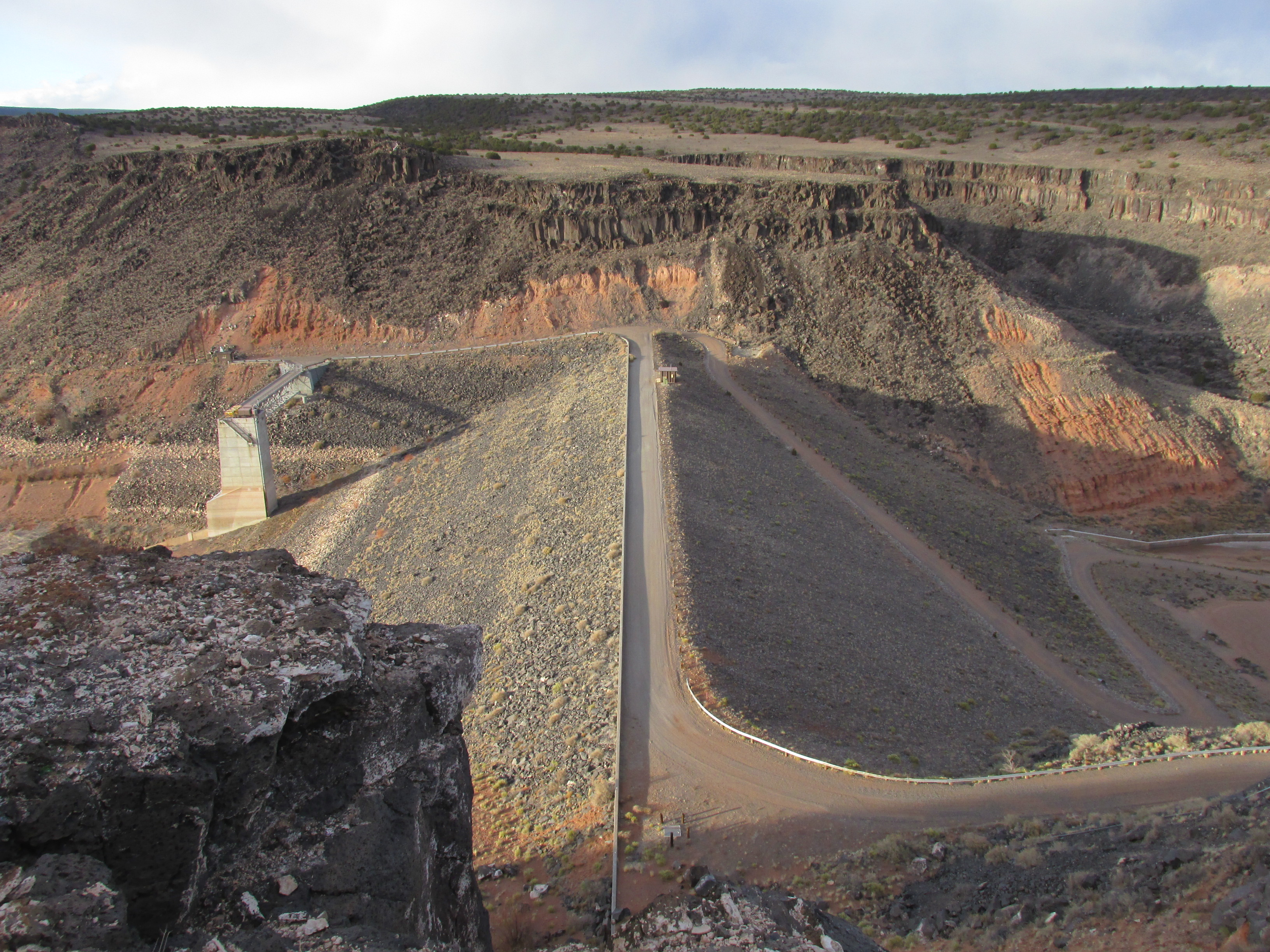
- Jemez Dam

- Location within New Mexico
- Country: United States
- Location: Sandoval County, New Mexico
- Coordinates: 35.39437°N 106.54702°W
- Purpose: Flood control and storm water management
- Opening date: 1953
- Owner: United States Army Corps of Engineers

Dam and spillways
- Height: 150 feet (46 m)
- Length: 870 feet (270 m)

Reservoir
- Total capacity: 264,700 acre-feet
- Surface area: 2.2 square miles (5.7 km^{2})

Jemez Canyon Dam (National ID # NM00003) is a dam in Sandoval County, New Mexico, in the United States, a few miles north of Albuquerque.

The earthen dam was constructed in 1953 by the United States Army Corps of Engineers, with a height of 150 feet and a length at its crest of 870 feet. It impounds the Jemez River creating Jemez Canyon Reservoir for flood control and storm water management in the spring and early summer seasons. The dam is owned by the Corps of Engineers, and operated by the Corps and the Cochiti Lake Project Office. It is one of the four Army Corps of Engineers projects for flood and sediment control on the Rio Grande system, operating in conjunction with Cochiti Dam, Abiquiu Dam, and Galisteo Dam.

== History ==
Jemez Canyon Dam was constructed in 1953 by the United States Army Corps of Engineers to control flooding on the Jemez River to protect farmland and property downstream in the Rio Grande Valley. Shortly after, in May-June 1958, high spring runoff in the Jemez Mountains filled the reservoir to 71,220 acre-feet.

Originally, the dam operated on a 48-hour hold regiment after storm events and during the spring runoff. This was to allow sediments to settle out of suspension before releasing the waters downstream into the Rio Grande. In early 1979, a permanent pool of 2,000 acre-feet was established behind the dam for sediment control purposes "to decrease aggradation in the Rio Grande channel and thereby maintain or improve channel conveyance for Rio Grande Compact deliveries." In October of 1984, the pool was increased to 3,000 acre-feet.

In 2001, the pool was gradually drained in order to deliver sediment directly downstream to the sediment-deficient Rio Grande and increase water availability. This caused a sharp reduction in recreation at the now dry reservoir, and in 2015, the area was closed to the public. Today, without sediment control or recreation functions, the dam operates solely for flood-control purposes.

== Recreation ==
The reservoir it creates, Jemez Canyon Reservoir, has a normal water surface of 2.2 square miles and a maximum capacity of 264,700 acre-feet. Recreation was historically high when there was a permanent pool of 2,000-3,000 acre feet due to its proximity to the growing Albuquerque metropolitan area.

Today, the reservoir is left dry, and recreation is limited. There is no access to the dam or lakebed. All land surrounding the reservoir, including a small day-use area with picnic facilities and a scenic overlook, is the property of Santa Ana Pueblo. Access is restricted to the day-use area only.

== Gallery ==
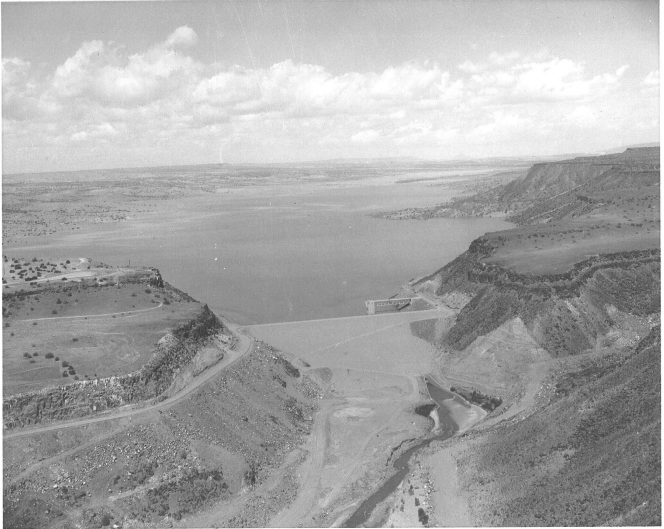
Jemez Canyon Dam with a full reservoir in May 1958

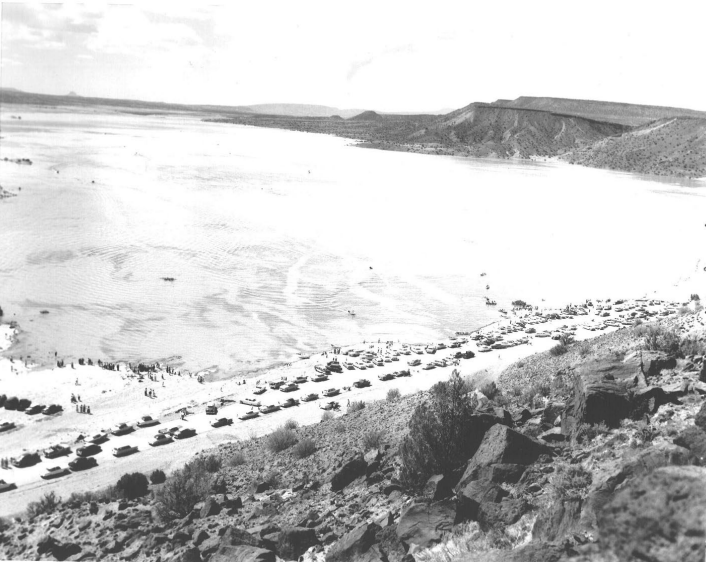
People recreating at the reservoir in May 1958
