= Comet Lake Dam =

- Location: Summit County, Ohio
- Coordinates: 40°55′21″N 81°31′33″W
- Construction began: 1922
- Operator(s): Private Property

Dam and spillways
- Impounds: Nimissila Creek

Reservoir
- Creates: Comet Lake

Comet Lake Dam is a dam located on Nimissila Creek in the city of Green in Summit County, Ohio, at 40°55′21″N 81°31′33″W. The reservoir created is called Comet Lake, and it drains into the upper Tuscarawas River by way of the Nimissila Creek.
