= Madison Lake, Ohio =

- Unincorporated community
- Location within Ohio Location within the United States
- Coordinates: 39°52′15″N 83°22′47″W
- Country: United States
- State: Ohio
- Counties: Madison
- Township: Union
- Elevation: 1,001 ft (305 m)
- Time zone: UTC-5 (Eastern (EST))
  - Summer (DST): UTC-4 (EDT)
- ZIP Code: 43140 (London)
- Area code: 740
- GNIS feature ID: 1048944

Madison Lake is an unincorporated community in Union Township, Madison County, Ohio, United States. It is located east of London around the shore of Madison Lake, for which it was named.
