= Lloyd Church Lake =

- Location within Oklahoma
- Location: Oklahoma
- Coordinates: 34°52′41″N 95°20′13″W
- Type: reservoir
- Basin countries: United States
- Surface area: 154 acres (0.62 km^{2})
- Average depth: 19.4 ft (5.9 m)
- Water volume: 3,025 acre-feet (3,731,000 m^{3})
- Shore length^{1}: 3.8 miles (6.1 km)
- Surface elevation: 748 ft (228 m)
- ^{1} Shore length is not a well-defined measure.

Lloyd Church Lake is a reservoir located south of the city of Wilburton, Oklahoma on a tributary of the Fourche Maline river. The lake is supported by an earthen dam and was constructed in 1964.

The lake has a normal capacity of 3,025 acre-feet (3,731,000 m^{3}), covers 154 acres (0.62 km^{2}), surrounded by 3.8 miles (6.1 km) of shoreline and has an average depth of 19.4 feet (5.9 m). The lake is operated by the city of Wilburton. It is also used for fishing.
