= Richland Creek Reservoir =

- Location within Georgia Location within the United States
- Location: Georgia
- Coordinates: 34°04′28″N 84°50′14″W
- Type: reservoir, from 2015
- Primary inflows: Etowah River
- Primary outflows: Etowah River
- Catchment area: 300 acres (1.2 km^{2}) 0.390 square miles
- Basin countries: United States
- Surface area: 305 acres (1.23 km^{2}) 0.4765 square miles

The Richland Creek Reservoir (RCR) is a reservoir in Paulding County, Georgia in the United States. It is primarily fed by a raw water pipeline from the Etowah River. The project was slated to be complete by 2019. However, the project was only fully functional and opened to the public in August, 2021.

== Reservoir ==
One of the main purposes of the lake is to provide three billion gallons of drinking water to existing and future populations in Paulding County. Paulding County residents currently purchase needed water from the Cobb County Marietta Water Authority (CCMWA). The RCR would create an independent drinking water supply for Paulding County, making it unnecessary to rely on CCMWA as the sole water provider. The financial analysis Paulding County had prepared to identify the most fiscally responsible approach to developing the RCR indicates that water rates for customers will increase slightly over time to support maintenance of the new reservoir, intake, water treatment plant and distribution lines. However, once established, these rates would be in place for a long time and customers would not be subjected to rate fluctuations that could be imposed by CCMWA.

Funding for the development of the RCR and associated infrastructure will be obtained through a combination of low interest loans provided by the Georgia Environmental Finance Authority (GEFA) and utility bonds. Application has also been sent to GEFA for consideration of funding through the State Direct Investment, (SDI), program. The RCR is one of four new reservoir projects being funded by GEFA's Governor's Water Supply Program (GWSP). Although GEFA has provided funding, the state will not have control over project development, implementation, or operation. Kevin Clark, Director of GEFA commented, "These… projects are the best, most strategic investments the state can make at this time to secure water supply in the right places and to tackle some of Georgia's most significant water supply challenges."

== Community involvement and information ==
- "RCRWater Project Website"
- "Paulding board gives go-ahead to finish design of county reservoir"
- "No Endangered Bats at Reservoir Site"
- "Paulding County gives RCR Reservoir the Green Light"
- "County Water System Staff Pulls 280lbs of trash from stream"
