= McNulty Reservoir Dam =

Dam in Eagle County, Colorado

Coordinates: 39°29′32″N 107°05′14″W

McNulty Reservoir Dam in Eagle County, Colorado, United States, sits 7,999 feet (2,438 meters) above sea level in Colorado's Rocky Mountains between Rifle, Colorado and Vail, Colorado and 6.8 miles (11 kilometers) outside El Jebel, Colorado. The Dam is a water storage that used to be utilized for ranching purposes on the historic Mcnulty Ranch.

The reservoir and dam are named for Eagle County, Colorado's McNulty family of cattle ranchers. The McNulty family members have been Eagle County, Colorado settlers from the 1880s and cattle ranchers there from the 1920s. A portion of their McNulty Ranch, a one time 2,500-acre cattle ranch (1,000 ha) operation on the Eagle-Garfield County line, was sold for Open Space conservation to Eagle county in 2006 for approximately $2 million. It is closed to any public access, fishing, or recreation.
