= Madison Lake (Ohio) =

- Location within Ohio Location within the United States
- Location: Madison County, Ohio, USA
- Coordinates: 39°52′25″N 83°22′29″W
- Type: Reservoir
- Basin countries: United States
- Surface area: 98 acres (0.40 km^{2})
- Surface elevation: 961 ft (293 m)
- Settlements: Madison Lake

Madison Lake is a reservoir in Madison County, Ohio located east of London, at 39°52′25″N 83°22′29″W. The community of Madison Lake sits on the western shore of the lake.

== History ==
Work on the lake was started in 1946, when land was deeded to the state for the purpose of building a lake. A dam was built across Deer Creek in this location, and the 6-foot (1.8 m) deep, 98-acre (40 ha) lake was filled within a year. In 1950, the lake was turned over to the Ohio Department of Natural Resources. The 183 acres (74 ha) of land surrounding the lake has since become Madison Lake State Park.
