= Madison Lake Dam =

- Location: Madison County, Ohio
- Coordinates: 39°51′57″N 83°22′33″W
- Construction began: 1946
- Opening date: 1947
- Operator(s): Ohio Department of Natural Resources

Dam and spillways
- Impounds: Deer Creek

Reservoir
- Creates: Madison Lake
- Surface area: 98 acres (40 ha)

Madison Lake Dam is a dam located on Deer Creek, about 4 miles (6.4 km) east of London in Madison County, Ohio, at 39°51′57″N 83°22′33″W.

Madison Lake Dam was originally planned out when a piece of land was donated to the state on which to build a lake. The Ohio Division of Conservation built a dam across Deer Creek, and the lake was filled by 1947. In 1950, the newly created Ohio Department of Natural Resources took over the site, and it has since become part of the Madison Lake State Park.
