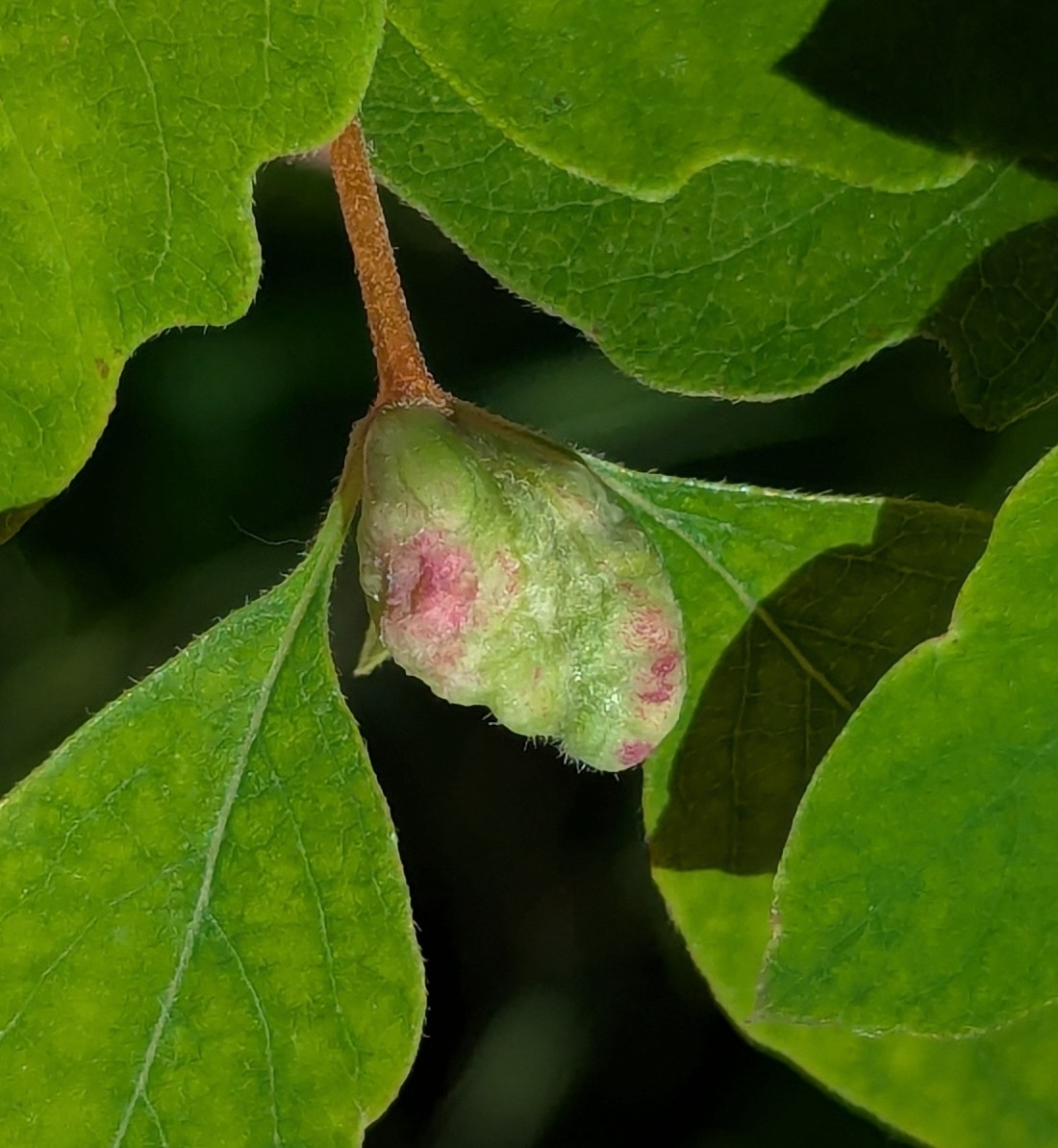
- Blennogeneris spissipes, Palo Alto, California

Scientific classification
- Kingdom: Animalia
- Phylum: Arthropoda
- Clade: Pancrustacea
- Class: Insecta
- Order: Hymenoptera
- Suborder: Symphyta
- Family: Tenthredinidae
- Genus: Blennogeneris
- Species: B. spissipes

Binomial name
- Blennogeneris spissipes Cresson, 1880

= Blennogeneris spissipes =

Species of sawfly

Blennogeneris spissipes, also known as the snowberry sawfly, is a species of sawfly in the family Tenthredinidae. It is native to North America, where it induces galls on the buds or leaves of Symphoricarpos albus and Symphoricarpos mollis. The species was first described by Ezra Townsend Cresson in 1880.

== Description ==
The adult snowberry sawfly has a black head with black antennae, and an abdomen that is either all black or reddish brown. The color of the thorax is highly variable. Unlike adult males, adult females have large back tibial spurs. Snowberry sawfly galls are pink, red, or green, and quite globular and fleshy in appearance. Larvae are not frequently observed, and are completely unknown for most species of Blennogeneris, but there are reports that the late instars of B. spissipes are entirely light green in color.

== Ecology ==
In the summer, the snowberry sawfly forms galls on the buds of snowberry plants. There is always one larvae per gall. Larvae will eat the interior of the gall before emerging to eat the leaves of the snowberry.
