= List of Oklahoma Wildlife Management Areas =

Managed Conservation Lands

Oklahoma Wildlife Management Areas are one type of protected conservation area within the U.S. state of Oklahoma.

== Description ==
“All lands owned, licensed, leased or under the management of the Wildlife Division of the Oklahoma Department of Wildlife Conservation, except for the McCurtain County Wilderness Area, are designated Wildlife Management Areas (WMA) to accurately reflect the overall objectives for these lands and the results of management activities conducted thereon. Depending on the specific management objectives, all or parts of any particular wildlife management area may also be designated as a public hunting area, game management area or migratory bird refuge, or wetland development unit.”

== List ==
Current Oklahoma Wildlife Management Areas (WMA's)
Name	County or counties	Area	Location	Remarks	Image
Altus-Lugert WMA	Greer and Kiowa	3,600 acres (1,500 ha)	three miles northeast of Granite on the north end of Lake Altus-Lugert		
Arbuckle Springs WMA	Johnston	3,869 acres (1,566 ha)	1 mile west of Bromide in northeastern part of county		
Arcadia Conservation Education Area (CEA)	Oklahoma		East of I-35, north of I-44 and on the east side of Lake Arcadia in Edmond	Managed by the Oklahoma Department of Wildlife Conservation for public and school education. Closed to All Hunting, with limited exceptions. Coordinates 35.623931, -97.389394	
Atoka WMA	Atoka	6,440 acres (2,610 ha)	12 miles north of Atoka bordering US 69 to the west.	Coordinates: 34.4718478,-95.9123338. The Atoka State Game Refuge is part of the WMA. Coordinates: 34.5222677,-96.0149346. The 12,897 acre Atoka Public Hunting Area (Stringtown) borders the WMA to the east.	
Bamberger WMA	Adair	301 acres (122 ha)	In western part of county		
Beaver River Wildlife Management Area	Beaver	17,700 acres (7,200 ha)	Southeast of Turpin in the western part of the county	In the Oklahoma panhandle	
Black Kettle WMA	Roger Mills	30,710 acres (12,430 ha)	Near Cheyenne	Connected with the Black Kettle National Grassland owned by the U.S. Forest Service	
Blue River WMA	Johnston	3,367 acres (1,363 ha)	8 miles northeast of Tishomingo	Bald eagles winter at Tishomingo NWR and occasionally seen at the WMA.	
Broken Bow WMA	McCurtain	5,420 acres (2,190 ha)	Northeast of Broken Bow in the northern part of the county	adjacent to the Broken Bow Reservoir and the Ouachita National Forest	
Camp Gruber WMA	Muskogee	A significant portion of the 55,680 acres (22,530 ha) in 5 areas.		Beginning January 1, 2003, the Oklahoma Army National Guard (OKARNG) and the Oklahoma Department of Wildlife Conservation (ODWC) reached an agreement to allow civilian hunting at the facility. See Camp Gruber.	
Candy Creek WMA	Osage	605 acres (245 ha)	northeast of Avant in the eastern part of the county		
Canton WMA	Blaine, Dewey, and Major	14,877 acres (6,021 ha)	Situated around Canton Lake	Coordinates: 35.771189, -95.064926 (Headquarters)	
Cherokee WMA	Cherokee	31,360 acres (12,690 ha)	Zeb in the southwestern part of the county	Comprises two sections: A 16,000 acres (6,500 ha) Public Hunting Area (PHA) and a 15,360 acres (6,220 ha) Game Management Area (GMA).	
Chickasaw NRA	Murray	4,500 acres (1,800 ha)	Near Sulphur	See Chickasaw National Recreation Area	
Cimarron Bluff WMA	Harper	3,430 acres (1,390 ha)	In the northeastern part of the county		
Cimarron Hills WMA	Woods County	3,770 acres (1,530 ha)	In the western part of the county		
Cookson WMA	Cherokee and Adair	14,725 acres (5,959 ha)	6 miles east of Cookson		
Hal and Fern Cooper WMA	Woodward and Harper	16,080 acres (6,510 ha)	Northwest of Woodward city		
Copan WMA	Washington	7,532 acres (3,048 ha)	North of Bartlesville	Includes Copan Wetland Development Unit (WDU)	
Cross Timbers WMA	Love	10,300 acres (4,200 ha)	15 miles west of Marietta		
Deep Fork WMA	Creek and Okfuskee	11,900 acres (4,800 ha)	10 miles south of Bristow	Includes Swift Bottoms WDU	
Dewey County WMA	Dewey	212 acres (86 ha)	Four miles west of Taloga		
Drummond Flats WMA	Garfield	4,653 acres (1,883 ha)	West of Drummond; eight miles southwest of Enid and in the western part of the county	Has a WDU section	
Ellis County WMA	Ellis	4,800 acres (1,900 ha)	8 miles west and 3.5 miles south of Arnett	160 acres (65 ha) Lake Lloyd Vincent created in 1961.	
Eufaula Wildlife Management Area (WMA)	Latimer, McIntosh, Pittsburg, and Okmulgee	48,614 acres (19,673 ha)		The WMA is separated into different sections or "arms". 1)- Duchess Creek arm, 2)- Gaines Creek Arm, 3)- Deep Fork Arm, 4)- Mill Creek Arm, 5)- North Canadian Arm, South Canadian Arm. Contains Deep Fork WDU and Mill Creek WDU	
Fobb Bottom WMA	Marshall	2,205 acres (892 ha)		Nearest town is Willis	
Fort Cobb WMA	Caddo	3,500 acres (1,400 ha)		Around the north end of Fort Cobb Lake. Includes Walnut Slough WDU	
Fort Gibson WMA	Wagoner and Cherokee	21,798 acres (8,821 ha)			
Fort Supply WMA	Woodward	5,418 acres (2,193 ha)	9 miles from Woodward	On the shore of Fort Supply Lake	
Gary Sherrer WMA	Pittsburg	1,280 acres (520 ha)		Nearest town: Hartshorne	
Gist WMA	Tillman	177 acres (72 ha)		6 miles northwest of Tipton	
Grady County WMA	Grady	1,036 acres (419 ha)	four and a half miles east of Rush Springs	Two non-contiguous tracts with a 33 acres (13 ha) non-contiguous tract between them.	
Grassy Slough WMA	McCurtain	1,016 acres (411 ha)	7 miles south of Idabel	Includes Grassy Slough WDU	
Hackberry Flat WMA	Tillman	7,120 acres (2,880 ha)	Southeast of Frederick	Includes Hackberry Flat WDU	
Heyburn WMA	Creek	5,865 acres (2,373 ha)		Owned by the US Army COE and surrounds Heyburn Lake	
Hickory Creek WMA	Love	7,363 acres (2,980 ha)	Five miles northeast of Marietta.		
Honobia WMA	Pushmataha, Le Flore, and McCurtain	97,758.18 acres (39,561.33 ha)	Borders the 203,246 acres (82,251 ha) Three Rivers WMA to the east.	Three private forest investment companies, the Hancock Natural Resource Group (HNRG), Rayonier Forest Resources, and Molpus Timberlands Management, entered into agreements with the Oklahoma Department of Wildlife Conservation (ODWC) to manage the states first privately owned WMA. The property is run under a land access fee permit system.	
Hugo WMA	Choctaw and Pushmataha	19,227 acres (7,781 ha)	Located along the Kiamichi River North of Lake Hugo and Hugo Lake State Park near Apple.	Includes Kiamichi River & Sawyer WDUs. 18,196 acres (7,364 ha) with the non-contiguous tracts of the Sawyer Unit having 551 acres (223 ha) and the Hamden Unit consisting of 480 acres (190 ha). A portion of the WMA was renamed the Lyndol Fry Waterfowl Refuge, adjacent to the Kiamichi River, and consisting of 3,500 acres.	
Hulah WMA	Osage	16,162 acres (6,541 ha)	20 miles northeast of Pawhuska. WMA follows the Caney River from southeast of Elgin, Kansas to Hulah Lake with three other fingers following creeks and rivers to Hulah Lake.	Includes Whipporwill WDU. In 2017 Lake Hulah was among 14 others, added to the Department of Environment Quality's list of elevated levels of mercury in fish, bringing the total to 54.	
James Collins WMA	Pittsburg and Latimer	21,353 acres (8,641 ha)	20 miles northeast of McAlester and 8 miles west of Quinton		
John Dahl WMA	Osage	480 acres (190 ha)	One mile east of Foraker in the western part of the county		
Kaw WMA	Kay and Osage	16,254 acres (6,578 ha)	Located just four and one half miles east of Newkirk	Upper two thirds of Kaw Lake. West fork encompasses the Arkansas River from the Kansas border to Kaw Lake. The east fork follows Beaver creek northeast (headwaters at 96°38′01″W 37°07′04″N in Kansas) a few miles into Osage County.	
Keystone WMA	Creek, Osage, and Pawnee	22,393 acres (9,062 ha)	Near Cleveland, Mannford, and Oilton	Includes Boston Pool, Buckeye Creek and Cottonwood Creek WDUs	
Lexington WMA	Cleveland	9,512 acres (3,849 ha)	Off of Highway 77 five miles south and six miles east of Noble		
Love Valley WMA	Love	7,746 acres (3,135 ha)		Includes Stevens Springs WDU. Bald eagles winter at the WMA.	
Lower Illinois River WMA (Watts Unit)	Sequoyah	320 acres (130 ha)	Four miles north of Gore	3/4 mile of lower Illinois River runs through the WMA	
Major County WMA	Major	210 acres (85 ha)	thirteen miles south and two and a half miles west of Waynoka		
McClellan-Kerr WMA	Wagoner, Muskogee, Haskell and Sequoyah	7,905 acres (3,199 ha)		Includes Billy Creek and Chouteau WDUs. Contains Billy Creek, Chouteau, and Robert S. Kerr Portions	
McCurtain County Wilderness Area	McCurtain	14,087 acres (5,701 ha)	In the northern part of the county	Last known red-cockaded woodpecker population in the state. Oldest department area and the largest virgin shortleaf pine/hardwood forest in the nation.	
McGee Creek WMA	Atoka county	10,000 acres (4,000 ha)	11 miles east of Stringtown in the south-central part of the county	The WMA is situated in the middle of the V-shaped 3,800 acres (1,500 ha) McGee Creek Lake that is fed by Potapo Creek from the northwest and McGee Creek from the north.McGee Creek State Park is on the southeast side.	
Mountain Park WMA	Kiowa	5,400 acres (2,200 ha)		Mountain Park WDU. WMA encircles the north and west side of Tom Steed Reservoir.	
Neosho WMA	Craig and Ottawa	726.36 acres (293.95 ha)	6 1/2 miles northwest of Welch		
Okmulgee WMA	Okmulgee	10,900 acres (4,400 ha)	5 miles west of Okmulgee city in west-central part of the county	Includes Okmulgee East & Okmulgee West WDUs	
Oologah WMA	Nowata and Rogers	12,941 acres (5,237 ha)	southeast of Nowata	North section includes the Verdigris River to just above the north shore of Oologah Lake. South section includes the northern banks of the lake, along most of the eastern side, and Goose Island. Includes Overcup Bottoms and Upper Verdigris WDUs. In 1988 there were reports of rituals being performed on the island.	
Optima WMA	Texas	8,062 acres (3,263 ha)	northwest of Hardesty in the eastern part of the county		see Optima National Wildlife Refuge
Osage WMA	Osage	9,512 acres (3,849 ha)	North of Pawhuska	The area is made up of two units, the Western Wall unit (5,950 acres) and the Rock Creek unit (3,722 acres)	
Ouachita Leflore Unit WMA	Le Flore	232,000 acres (94,000 ha)	10 miles south of Heavener	Part of the Ouachita National Forest. Managed cooperatively between the Oklahoma Department of Wildlife Conservation and the United States Forest Service.	
Ouachita McCurtain Unit WMA	McCurtain	131,000 acres (53,000 ha)		The Broken Bow Sub-unit is located north of Broken Bow, surrounding Broken Bow Lake and the Glover River. The Tiak Sub-unit is located southeast of Idabel surrounding the towns of Haworth and Tom	
Ozark Plateau WMA	Adair	2,076 acres (840 ha)	2 miles east of Bell		
Packsaddle WMA	Ellis	19,659 acres (7,956 ha)	17 miles south of Arnett		
Pine Creek WMA	Pushmataha and McCurtain	10,280 acres (4,160 ha)	7 miles (11 km) north of Valliant, Oklahoma	Adjacent to the Little River	
Pushmataha WMA	Pushmataha	19,237 acres (7,785 ha)	5 miles (8.0 km) south of Clayton		
Red Slough WMA	McCurtain	5,814 acres (2,353 ha)	6 miles south of Haworth	Includes Red Slough WDU Golden and bald eagles as well as American alligators have been seen on the WMA.	
Rita Blanca WMA	Cimarron	15,575 acres (6,303 ha)		46 units in the southwestern part of the county along the border with Dallam County, Texas	see Rita Blanca National Grassland
Robbers Cave WMA	Latimer	6,180 acres (2,500 ha)	North of Wilburton		
Salt Plains National Wildlife Refuge	Alfalfa	32,080 acres (12,980 ha)		see Salt Plains National Wildlife Refuge	
Sandy Sanders WMA	Greer and Beckham	29,766 acres (12,046 ha)	26 miles northwest of Mangum and 26 miles southwest of Sayre		
Sans Bois WMA	Haskell	7,602.40 acres (3,076.58 ha)	South of McCurtain		
Schultz WMA	Texas	306 acres (124 ha)		South of Hardesty	
Sequoyah WMA (National Wildlife Refuge)	Sequoyah, Muskogee and Haskell	20,800 acres (8,400 ha)	Around the Robert S. Kerr Reservoir	Established in 1970, a partnership between Ducks Unlimited, U.S. Army Corps of Engineers, Oklahoma Department of Wildlife Conservation, the National Audubon Society, U.S. Coast Guard, Oklahoma State Parks, Oklahoma State University, and Missouri State University. Hunting is allowed in the Sandtown Bottom, Webbers Bottom, and Girty Bottom. See Sequoyah National Wildlife Refuge	
Skiatook WMA	Osage	5,085 acres (2,058 ha)	Near Hominy and Skiatook	Upper ends of Skiatook Lake	
Sparrow Hawk WMA	Cherokee	566 acres (229 ha)	five miles east of Tahlequah.		
Spavinaw WMA	Delaware and Mayes	14,316 acres (5,793 ha)	Spavinaw	South side of Lake Spavinaw. Game Management (GMA) and Public Hunting Area (PHA)	
Stringtown WMA	Atoka	2,260 acres (910 ha)	7 miles east of Stringtown		
Tenkiller WMA	Cherokee and Sequoyah	2,590 acres (1,050 ha)	seventeen miles south of Tahlequah	On the southwest shores of Lake Tenkiller	
Texoma Washita Arm WMA	Johnston	13,286 acres (5,377 ha)	Southwest of Tishomingo	Includes Washita Arm WDU.	
Three Rivers WMA	McCurtain and Pushmataha	203,246 acres (82,251 ha)	North of Broken Bow		
Washita County WMA	Washita	240 acres (97 ha)	3 miles northwest of Cordell		
Washita NWR	Custer	8,075 acres (3,268 ha)	on shore of Foss Reservoir	see Washita National Wildlife Refuge	
Waurika WMA	Cotton and Stephens	10,580 acres (4,280 ha)	West of Comanche	Includes Waurika WDU and Walker Creek WDU.	
Whitegrass Flats WMA	McCurtain	391 acres (158 ha)	Near Valliant	Includes White Grass Flats WDU.	
Wichita Mountains Wildlife Refuge	Comanche	59,020 acres (23,880 ha)		Note: A "National Wildlife Refuge"	
Wister WMA	Le Flore and Latimer	35,500 acres (14,400 ha)	Around Lake Wister	Includes Joe Johnson WDU and Fourche Maline WDU.	
Yourman WMA	Latimer	2,860 acres (1,160 ha)			
