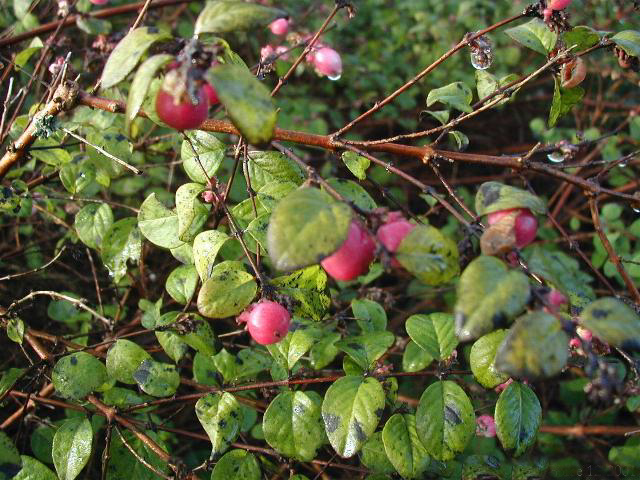

Scientific classification
- Kingdom: Plantae
- Clade: Tracheophytes
- Clade: Angiosperms
- Clade: Eudicots
- Clade: Asterids
- Order: Dipsacales
- Family: Caprifoliaceae
- Genus: Symphoricarpos
- Species: S. × chenaultii

Binomial name
- Symphoricarpos × chenaultii Rehder 1920

Synonyms
- Symphoricarpos chenaultii Rehder; Symphoricarpos ×chenaultii Rehder; Symphoricarpos parviflorus conglomeratus Chenault; × Symphoricarpos chenaultii Rehder

= Symphoricarpos × chenaultii =

Species of shrub

Symphoricarpos × chenaultii, the Chenault coralberry, is a nothospecies (hybrid) group of shrubs in the honeysuckle family. It was grown in France in 1912 as a hybrid S. microphyllus × S. orbiculatus.
