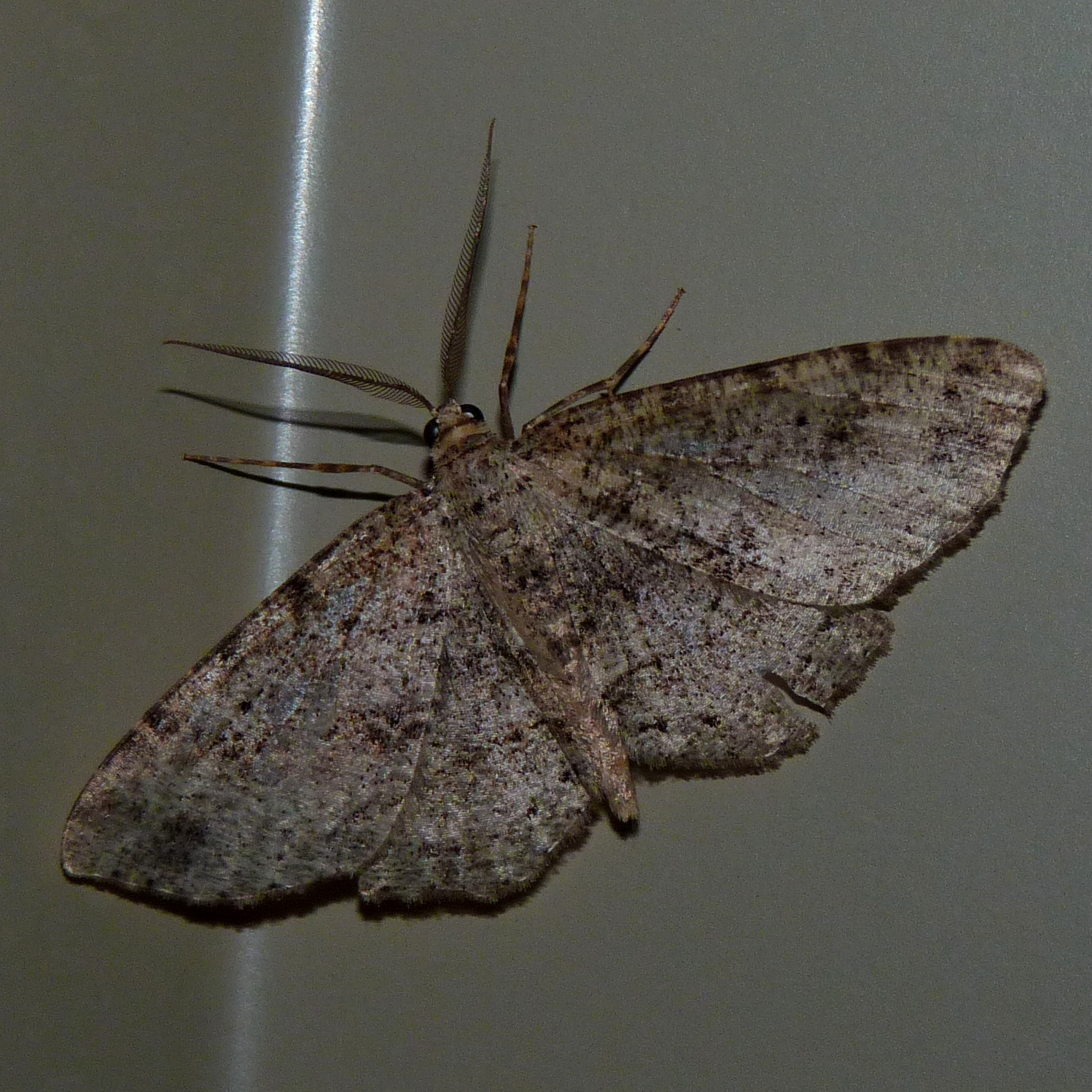

Scientific classification
- Kingdom: Animalia
- Phylum: Arthropoda
- Clade: Pancrustacea
- Class: Insecta
- Order: Lepidoptera
- Family: Geometridae
- Genus: Hesperumia
- Species: H. latipennis

Binomial name
- Hesperumia latipennis (Hulst, 1896)

Synonyms
- Alcis latipennis Hulst, 1896

= Hesperumia latipennis =

Species of moth

Hesperumia latipennis is a moth of the family Geometridae first described by George Duryea Hulst in 1896. It is found in western North America from British Columbia south to California.

The wingspan is 34–36 mm.

Adults are on wing from May to August.

The larvae feed on various trees and shrubs, including Rhamnus purshiana, Holodiscus discolor, Sambucus species and Symphoricarpos albus.

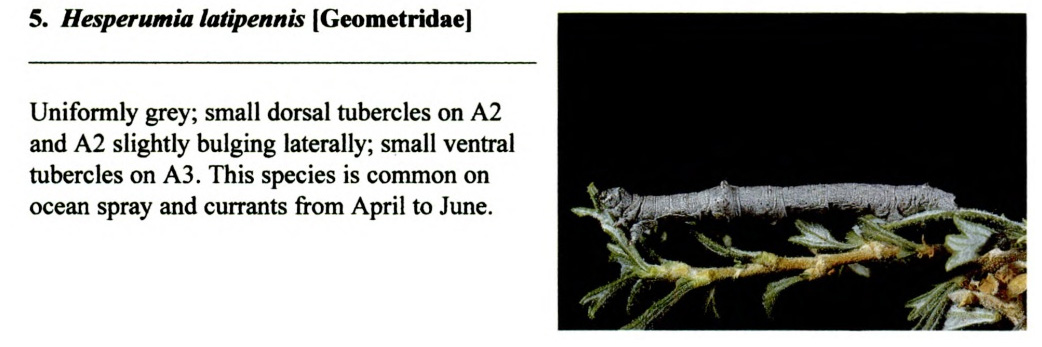
Hesperumia latipennis caterpillar
