= Symphoricarpos guadalupensis =

Scientific classification
- Kingdom: Plantae
- Clade: Tracheophytes
- Clade: Angiosperms
- Clade: Eudicots
- Clade: Asterids
- Order: Dipsacales
- Family: Caprifoliaceae
- Genus: Symphoricarpos
- Species: S. guadalupensis

Binomial name
- Symphoricarpos guadalupensis Correll 1968

Species of flowering plant

Symphoricarpos guadalupensis, McKittrock's snowberry, is a rare North American species of plants in the honeysuckle family. It has been found only in the Sierra Del Carmen Mountains of Coahuila and in South McKittrick Canyon in the Guadalupe Mountains of western Texas. This is inside Guadalupe Mountains National Park.

Symphoricarpos guadalupensis is a hairless shrub. This distinguishes it sharply from Symphoricarpos palmeri, which can be found growing in the same canyon as S. guadalupensis but is rather hairy.
