= Pushmataha Wildlife Management Area =

Preserve in Pushmataha County, Oklahoma, US

Coordinates: 34.53°N 95.35°W

Pushmataha Wildlife Management Area is a scientifically managed preserve of native flora and fauna in northern Pushmataha County, Oklahoma, five miles (8 km) south of Clayton, Oklahoma. It is managed by the Oklahoma Department of Wildlife Conservation.

The Pushmataha WMA comprises 19,237 acres (77.85 km^{2}), over 29 square miles (75 km^{2}), all of it in the Kiamichi Mountains. Its predominant characteristics are a mixture of oak/pine forest with steep slopes, shallow soils and rocky terrain.

Scientific management of native habitats is pursued in earnest in the WMA, which is home to one of the longest-running multi-year research projects in southeastern Oklahoma. Spanning almost 30 years is a research project examining the response of vegetation to fire frequency. The project occupies 130 acres (0.53 km^{2}) of the 19,000-acre (77 km^{2}) area, and is called the Pushmataha Forest Habitat Research Demonstration Area.

Burnings take place as well to improve the timber stand and produce native wildlife foods, another area of study.

== History ==
The WMA dates from 1947, when the State of Oklahoma purchased and established it as a deer preserve. At the time, the state's deer herd had been overhunted and had dropped to less than 500 animals. The state wildlife department nurtured a herd of native deer in the WMA and began exporting it to other parts of Oklahoma. The effort was very successful, and controlled hunts were allowed in its territory by the 1960s.

Today the deer herd in the WMA is at a buck-to-deer ratio of 1:2.5.

Elk has been reintroduced to the WMA, beginning in 1969. A total of 72 head of elk were captured at the Wichita Mountains Wildlife Refuge and brought to the Pushmataha WMA. By 2000 the herd had prospered—today it numbers approximately 40 animals—but its genetic diversity had suffered, causing an additional eight head of elk to be imported. Several had radio telemetry collars attached, and have yielded surprising data: young bulls, as example, travel over 80 miles (130 km) per week.

== Plants ==
Over 450 varieties of native plants have been cataloged in the WMA. Tree species include shortleaf pine, post oak, red oak, black oak, hickory, elm, blackgum, sweetgum, rusty blackhaw (Viburnum rufidulum), flowering dogwood, and hawthorn (Crataegus). There is also an abundance of high bush huckleberry, low bush huckleberry, different types of sumac, coralberry, poison ivy, greenbrier, blackberry and others.

== Animals ==
Among the game species found in the WMA are whitetail deer, bobwhite quail, eastern wild turkeys, cottontail rabbits, coyote, bobcat, opossum, skunk, raccoon, dove, wood duck, mallards, woodcock, fox squirrel, and game squirrel.

Nongame species include Bachman's sparrow, brown creeper, owls, particularly screech owls, and eastern wood pewee.

Approximately 52 inches (1,300 mm) of rain fall per year in the WMA.

== See also ==
List of Oklahoma Wildlife Management Areas
