= Pine Creek Wildlife Management Area =

Protected area in Oklahoma, United States

Coordinates: 34.1124°N 95.1373°W

Pine Creek Wildlife Management Area is a scientifically managed preserve of natural and native wildlife flora and fauna. It is located in Pushmataha County and McCurtain County, Oklahoma, adjacent to Pine Creek Lake, seven miles (11 km) north of Valliant, Oklahoma.

Pine Creek WMA consists of 10,280 acres (41.6 km^{2}). It is adjacent to Little River and its impoundment, Pine Creek Lake, which offers additional and coextensive protected areas for wildlife.

== Ecosystem ==
Trees include six species of oak as well as ash, hickory, pine, river birch, and willow. Sand plum, holly, sumac, and a great variety of grasses and legumes are also present.

Soil types range from deep sand to rocky.

The area receives approximately 53 inches (1,300 mm) of rain per year, and is well-watered.

Game species are abundant: bobwhite quail, whitetail deer, eastern wild turkeys, cottontail rabbits and swamp rabbits, coyote, bobcats, beavers, mink, raccoons, doves, and geese may all be found in varying numbers.

Nongame species are also in evidence: black bear, river otters, and bald eagles are also part of the WMA's ecosystem. None of these nongame species may be hunted. Eagles winter at Pine Creek Lake and travel the Little River watershed.

== Management ==
Intensive management practices maintain old farm field habitat, as well as a variety of natural landscapes. Approximately 250 acres (1.0 km^{2}) of food plots are planted yearly. Management practices include burning, plowing, and brush hogging provide native plant food resources and maintain habitat diversity.

== See also ==
- List of Oklahoma Wildlife Management Areas
