= Symphoricarpos parishii =

Scientific classification
- Kingdom: Plantae
- Clade: Tracheophytes
- Clade: Angiosperms
- Clade: Eudicots
- Clade: Asterids
- Order: Dipsacales
- Family: Caprifoliaceae
- Genus: Symphoricarpos
- Species: S. parishii

Binomial name
- Symphoricarpos parishii Rydb. 1899

Synonyms
- List: Symphoricarpos parishii Rydb.; Symphoricarpos oreophilus var. parishii (Rydb.) Cronquist; Symphoricarpos rotundifolius var. parishii (Rydb.) Dempster; Symphoricarpos glaucus Eastw.; Symphoricarpos parvifolius Eastw.

Species of flowering plant

Symphoricarpos parishii, or Parish's snowberry, is a North American species of flowering plant in the honeysuckle family. It had been found in California, Nevada, Arizona, and Baja California.

Symphoricarpos parishii is a low spreading shrub. Stems are up to 100 cm (40 inches) long, sometimes leaning against other vegetation. Leaves are up to 2 cm (0.8 inch) long, dark green on the upper surface but lighter green underneath. It has pink, bell-shaped flowers and white fruits.
