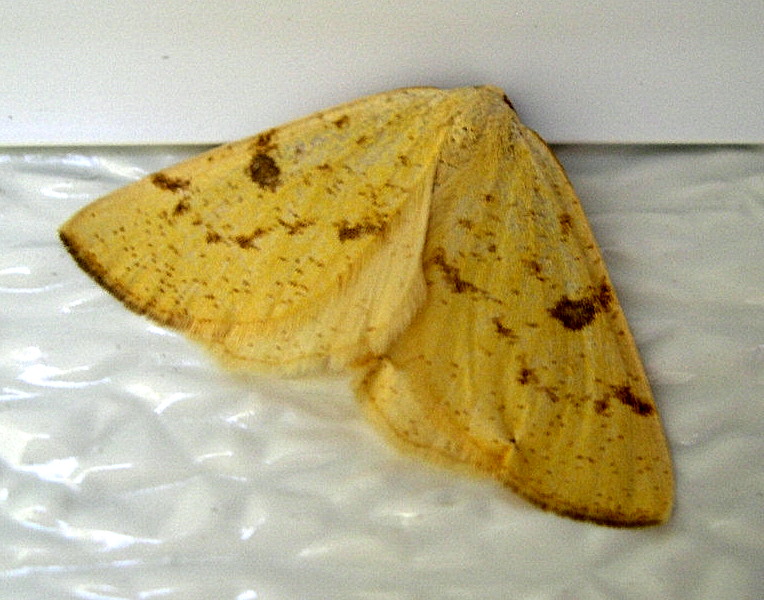

Scientific classification
- Kingdom: Animalia
- Phylum: Arthropoda
- Clade: Pancrustacea
- Class: Insecta
- Order: Lepidoptera
- Family: Geometridae
- Genus: Hesperumia
- Species: H. sulphuraria

Binomial name
- Hesperumia sulphuraria Packard, 1873

= Hesperumia sulphuraria =

Species of moth

Hesperumia sulphuraria, commonly known as the sulphur moth or sulphur wave, is a species of geometrid moth in the family Geometridae. It is found in North America.

== Gallery ==
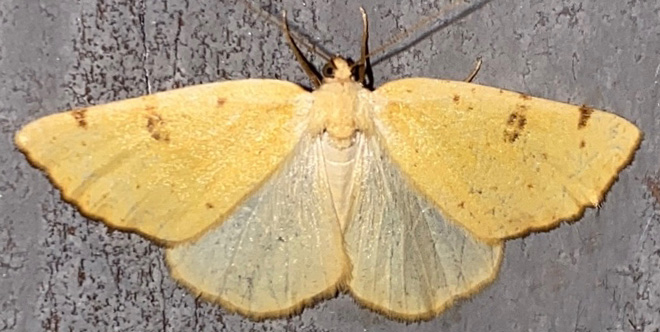
Hesperumia sulphuraria. Oregon

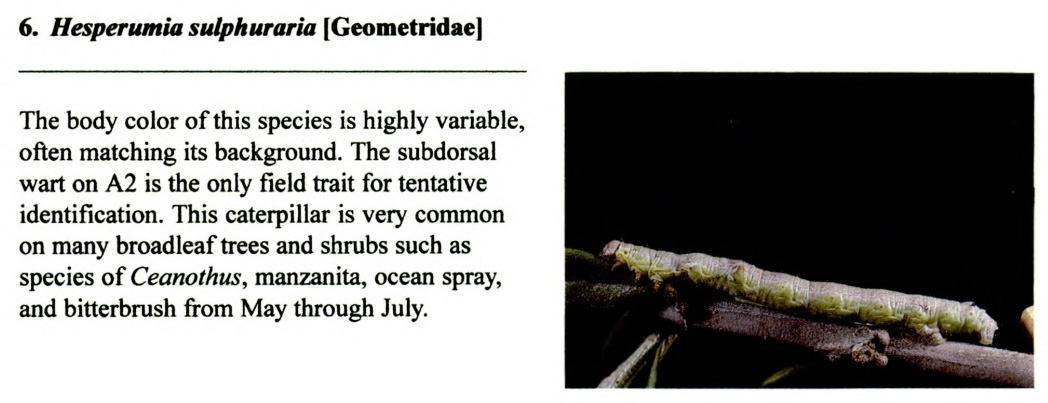
Hesperumia sulphuraria caterpillar
