= Symphoricarpos vaccinioides =

Scientific classification
- Kingdom: Plantae
- Clade: Tracheophytes
- Clade: Angiosperms
- Clade: Eudicots
- Clade: Asterids
- Order: Dipsacales
- Family: Caprifoliaceae
- Genus: Symphoricarpos
- Species: S. vaccinioides

Binomial name
- Symphoricarpos vaccinioides Rydb. 1900

Species of flowering plant

Symphoricarpos vaccinioides (Roundleaf Snowberry) is a North American species of flowering plant in the honeysuckle family. It had been found in western Canada (British Columbia) and in the western United States (Washington, Oregon, California, Nevada, Idaho, Utah, Montana, Wyoming, Colorado).

Symphoricarpos vaccinioides is an erect branching shrub sometimes as much as 150 cm (5 feet) tall,. Leaves are up to 2 cm (0.8 inch) long, dark green on the upper surface but lighter green underneath. It has pink, bell-shaped flowers and white fruits.
