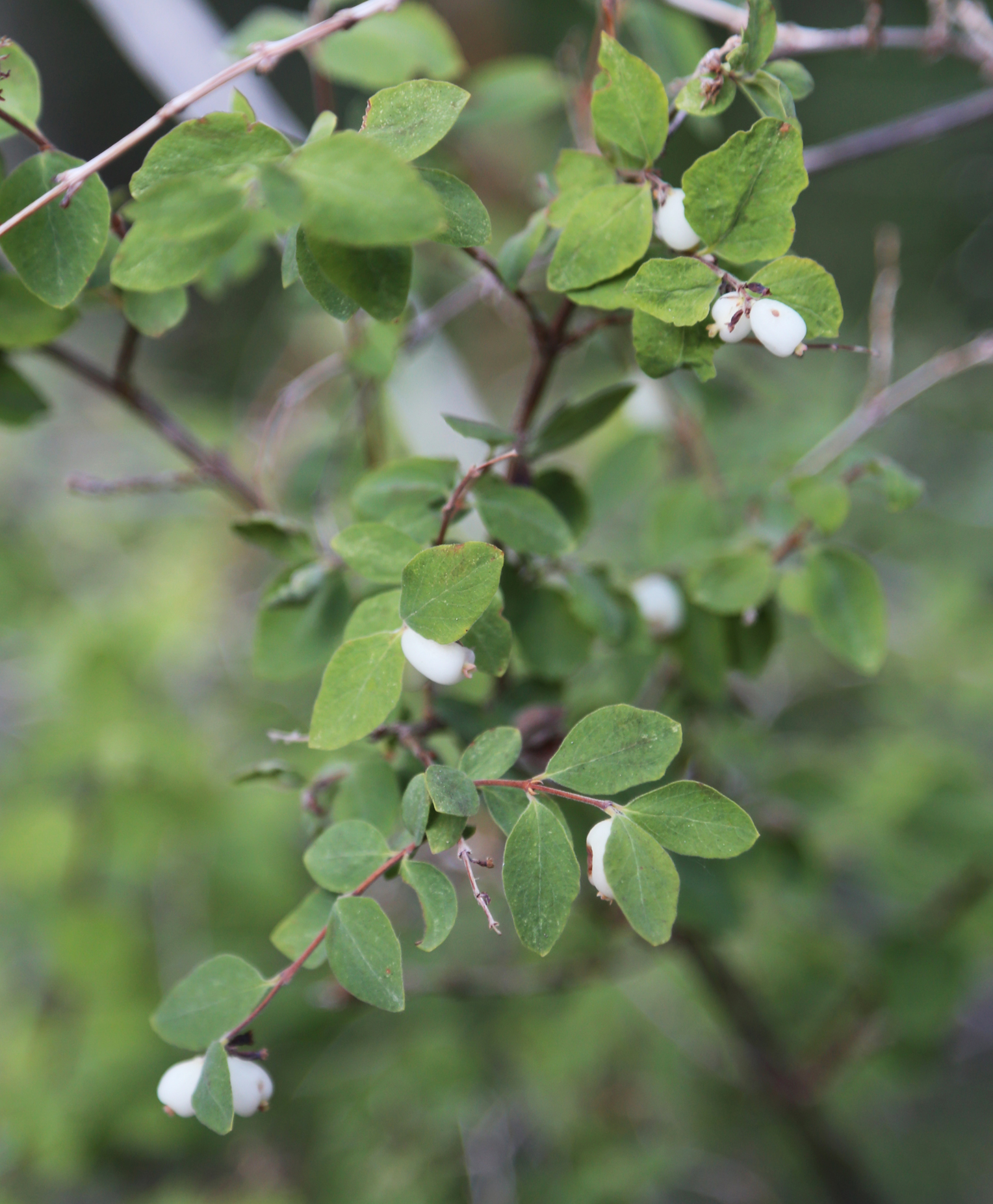

Conservation status
- Secure (NatureServe)

Scientific classification
- Kingdom: Plantae
- Clade: Tracheophytes
- Clade: Angiosperms
- Clade: Eudicots
- Clade: Asterids
- Order: Dipsacales
- Family: Caprifoliaceae
- Genus: Symphoricarpos
- Species: S. rotundifolius

Binomial name
- Symphoricarpos rotundifolius A.Gray 1853

= Symphoricarpos rotundifolius =

Species of shrub

Symphoricarpos rotundifolius is a North American subshrub in the honeysuckle family, also known by the common name round-leaved snowberry.

== Habitat and range ==
Symphoricarpos rotundifolius is native to the western United States and northwestern Mexico. It has been found in California, Arizona, New Mexico, Colorado, Utah, Nevada, Idaho, eastern Oregon, the Oklahoma Panhandle, far western Texas, and northern Baja California.

== Growth pattern ==
Symphoricarpos rotundifolius is an erect, spreading, or trailing subshrub, about 2 to 4 feet (0.61 to 1.22 m) tall, with many stiff branches.

== Stems and leaves ==
Older woody parts are covered in shreddy bark and smaller, newer twigs are coated in fuzzy hairs.

The species epithet, rotundifolia ("round leaved") is slightly misleading, since the 1/4 to 3/4 inch (0.6 to 1.9 cm) leaves are oval to elliptic, not perfectly circular. Leaves are green above, and pale green with many veins below.

== Inflorescence and fruit ==
The inflorescence is a raceme emerging from the leaf axils with one or two pendant flowers having narrowly bell-shaped, pink to white corollas up to 1 cm (0.4 inch) with a lobed mouth.

The fruit is a white berry-like drupe about a centimeter (0.4 inch) wide, containing two seeds.

The genus name means "fruits together", referring to flowers and fruits usually occurring in pairs.

It flowers from June to August.
