= Sobol, Oklahoma =

Unincorporated community in Oklahoma, US

Coordinates: 34°09′40″N 95°14′19″W

Sobol is an unincorporated community in southeastern Pushmataha County, Oklahoma, United States.

A United States Post Office was established here on January 21, 1911. It was named for Harry Sobol, a merchant in nearby Fort Towson.

Sobol was isolated until construction and paving of Oklahoma State Highway 3, which connects it to Rattan on the west and Broken Bow to the east.

Pine Creek Lake lies a few miles to its east. Built by the U.S. Army Corps of Engineers for flood control along Little River and Pine Creek, the lake is also a popular fishing spot.

Caney Mountain lies to Sobol's north and Bull Mountain is to its south. Caney Mountain Trail connects the Sobol area to Blackjack Mountain (1,243 ft.), Caney Mountain (686 ft.), Musket Mountain (1,384 ft.), Wolf Mountain (883 ft.), and East Signal Peak (1,483 ft.), in the Kiamichi Mountains.
