= Symphoricarpos hesperius =

Scientific classification
- Kingdom: Plantae
- Clade: Tracheophytes
- Clade: Angiosperms
- Clade: Eudicots
- Clade: Asterids
- Order: Dipsacales
- Family: Caprifoliaceae
- Genus: Symphoricarpos
- Species: S. hesperius

Binomial name
- Symphoricarpos hesperius G.N.Jones 1940

Synonyms
- Symphoricarpos mollis subsp. hesperius (G.N. Jones) Abrams ex Ferris; Symphoricarpos mollis var. hesperius (G.N. Jones) Cronquist

Species of shrub

Symphoricarpos hesperius, called the trailing snowberry or creeping snowberry, is a North American species of trailing shrubs in the honeysuckle family. It is native to southwestern Canada (southwestern British Columbia) and the northwestern United States (Oregon, Washington, Idaho, and far northern California)

Symphoricarpos hesperius has pink flowers and white fruits. Leaves are oval-shaped, sometimes lobed, and grow opposite each other. The stems and undersides of the leaves also have short hairs.
