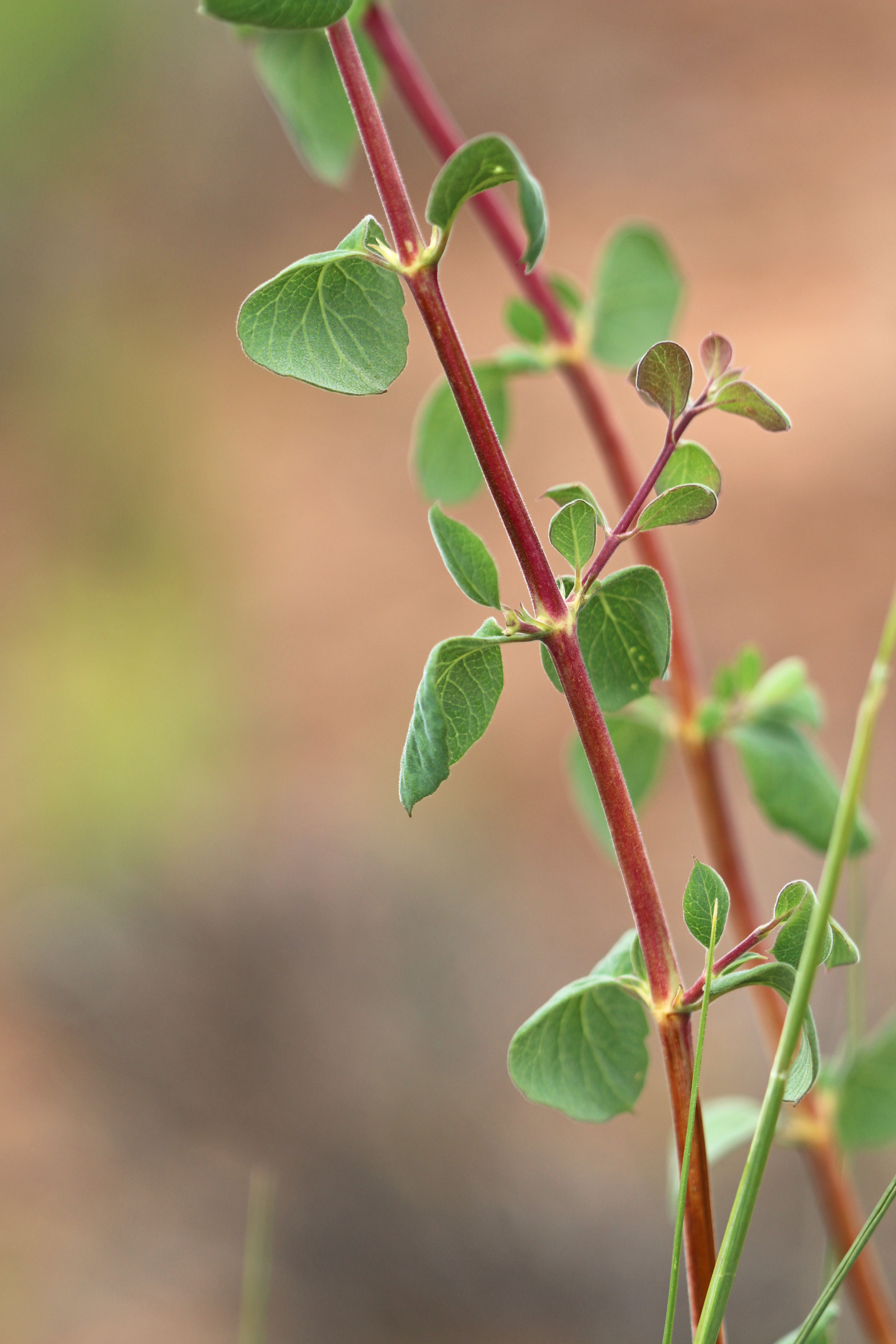

Conservation status
- Secure (NatureServe)

Scientific classification
- Kingdom: Plantae
- Clade: Tracheophytes
- Clade: Angiosperms
- Clade: Eudicots
- Clade: Asterids
- Order: Dipsacales
- Family: Caprifoliaceae
- Genus: Symphoricarpos
- Species: S. longiflorus

Binomial name
- Symphoricarpos longiflorus A.Gray 1873

= Symphoricarpos longiflorus =

Species of flowering plant

Symphoricarpos longiflorus is a species of flowering plant in the honeysuckle family known by the common names desert snowberry and fragrant snowberry. It is native to the western United States from the Great Basin to western Texas, as well as northwestern Mexico (Sonora, Chihuahua, Baja California).

Symphoricarpos longiflorus grows in rocky desert habitat, sagebrush, chaparral, forests, woodlands, and other habitat. It is most often found in dry habitat types.

Symphoricarpos longiflorus is an erect, spreading shrub with many stiff branches, reaching up to about a meter (40 inches) in height. It is hairless to lightly hairy and sometimes glandular, and the branches may be lined with tiny spines. The bark is reddish and ages white and shreddy. The thick, fuzzy, green or blue-tinged leaves are generally lance-shaped, sometimes with rounded tips. They are usually no more than 2 centimeters (0.8 inches) long. The fragrant flowers occur singly or in pairs in leaf axils, or are borne in a small raceme. Each flower has a long, slender, tubular throat up to 1.5 centimeters (0.6 inch) long, and a spreading face with five pointed lobes. The tube is bright to pale pink or cream in color, and the face of the corolla may be lighter in tone. The fruit is a dry drupe under a centimeter wide with two seeds.
