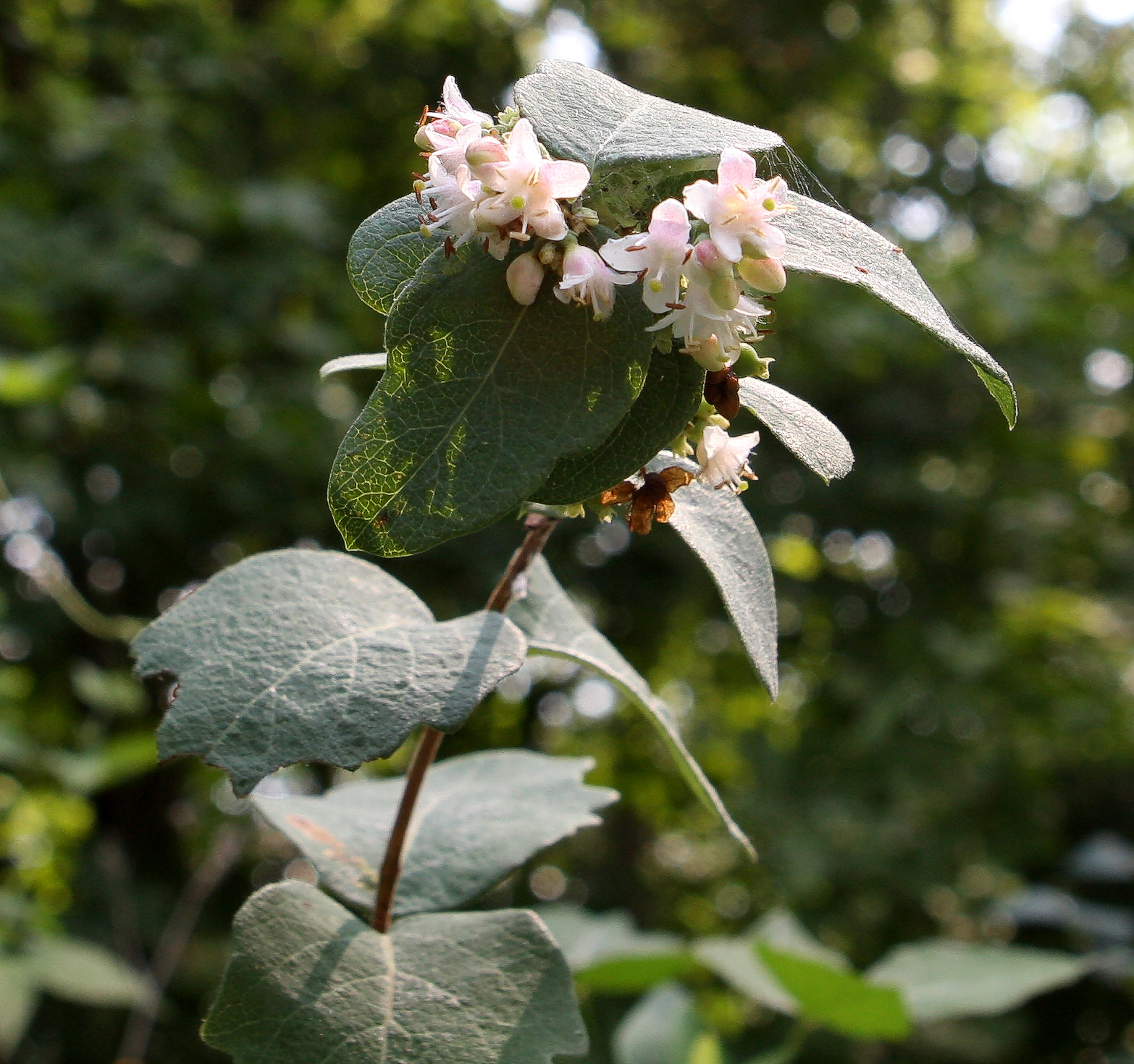

Conservation status
- Secure (NatureServe)

Scientific classification
- Kingdom: Plantae
- Clade: Tracheophytes
- Clade: Angiosperms
- Clade: Eudicots
- Clade: Asterids
- Order: Dipsacales
- Family: Caprifoliaceae
- Genus: Symphoricarpos
- Species: S. occidentalis

Binomial name
- Symphoricarpos occidentalis Hook. 1833

= Symphoricarpos occidentalis =

Species of flowering plant

Symphoricarpos occidentalis, commonly called western snowberry, is a woody species of flowering plant in the honeysuckle family.

== Description ==
Symphoricarpos occidentalis is a creeping shrub. The leaves are up to 8 centimetres (3 in) long, with smooth edges and typically a hairy underside.

The flowers are pink and rounded to bell-shaped. The fruits are spherical or bulbous shaped, white or pink-tinted.

== Distribution and habitat ==
Symphoricarpos occidentalis is native across much of Canada plus the northern and central United States as far south as Oklahoma, northeastern New Mexico, and the Texas Panhandle.

It grows near streams and in moist soils.

== Cultivation ==
Western snowberry is grown for use in native plant and wildlife gardens, and as a bird food plant in habitat landscapes. It is considered to be a weed in certain situations.

== Edibility ==
The berries are inedible.
