= Symphoricarpos guatemalensis =

Scientific classification
- Kingdom: Plantae
- Clade: Tracheophytes
- Clade: Angiosperms
- Clade: Eudicots
- Clade: Asterids
- Order: Dipsacales
- Family: Caprifoliaceae
- Genus: Symphoricarpos
- Species: S. guatemalensis

Binomial name
- Symphoricarpos guatemalensis J.K.Williams 1994

Species of flowering plant

Symphoricarpos guatemalensis is a Central American species of flowering plant in the honeysuckle family. It has been found only in Guatemala.

Symphoricarpos guatemalensis is an erect branching shrub sometimes as much as 2 meters (80 inches) tall. Leaves are tiny, rarely more than 6 mm (0.24 inch) long. It has white flowers and white fruits.
