= Honobia Creek Wildlife Management Area =

Protected area in Oklahoma, United States

- Honobia Creek WMA
- IUCN category V (protected landscape/seascape)
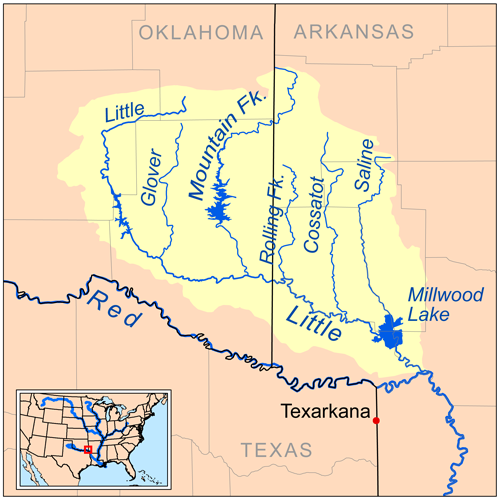
- Map of the Little River watershed through Honobia Creek WMA

- Location within Oklahoma
- Location: Pushmataha, Le Flore, and McCurtain Counties, Oklahoma
- Nearest city: Rattan, Oklahoma
- Coordinates: 34°22′33″N 95°14′48″W (Cloudy Nashoba Trail)
- Area: 97,758.18 acres (395.6133 km^{2})
- Governing body: Private land managed by the Oklahoma Department of Wildlife Conservation (ODWC)

Honobia Creek Wildlife Management Area is a protected area of privately owned land located in Pushmataha, Le Flore, and McCurtain Counties, Oklahoma, totaling 97,758.18 acres (39,561.33 ha), and managed by the Oklahoma Department of Wildlife Conservation (ODWC).

== Organization ==
Three private forest investment companies, the Hancock Natural Resource Group (HNRG), Rayonier Forest Resources, and Molpus Timberlands Management, entered into agreements with the Oklahoma Department of Wildlife Conservation (ODWC) in 2010 to manage the states first privately owned WMA. The property is run under a land access fee permit system.

== Location ==
Located in the southeast corner of Oklahoma twenty-one miles of the upper course of the Little River flows through the WMA. The 203,246 acres (82,251 ha) Three Rivers WMA shares 16 miles (26 km) of border on the east side.

== See also ==
List of Oklahoma Wildlife Management Areas
