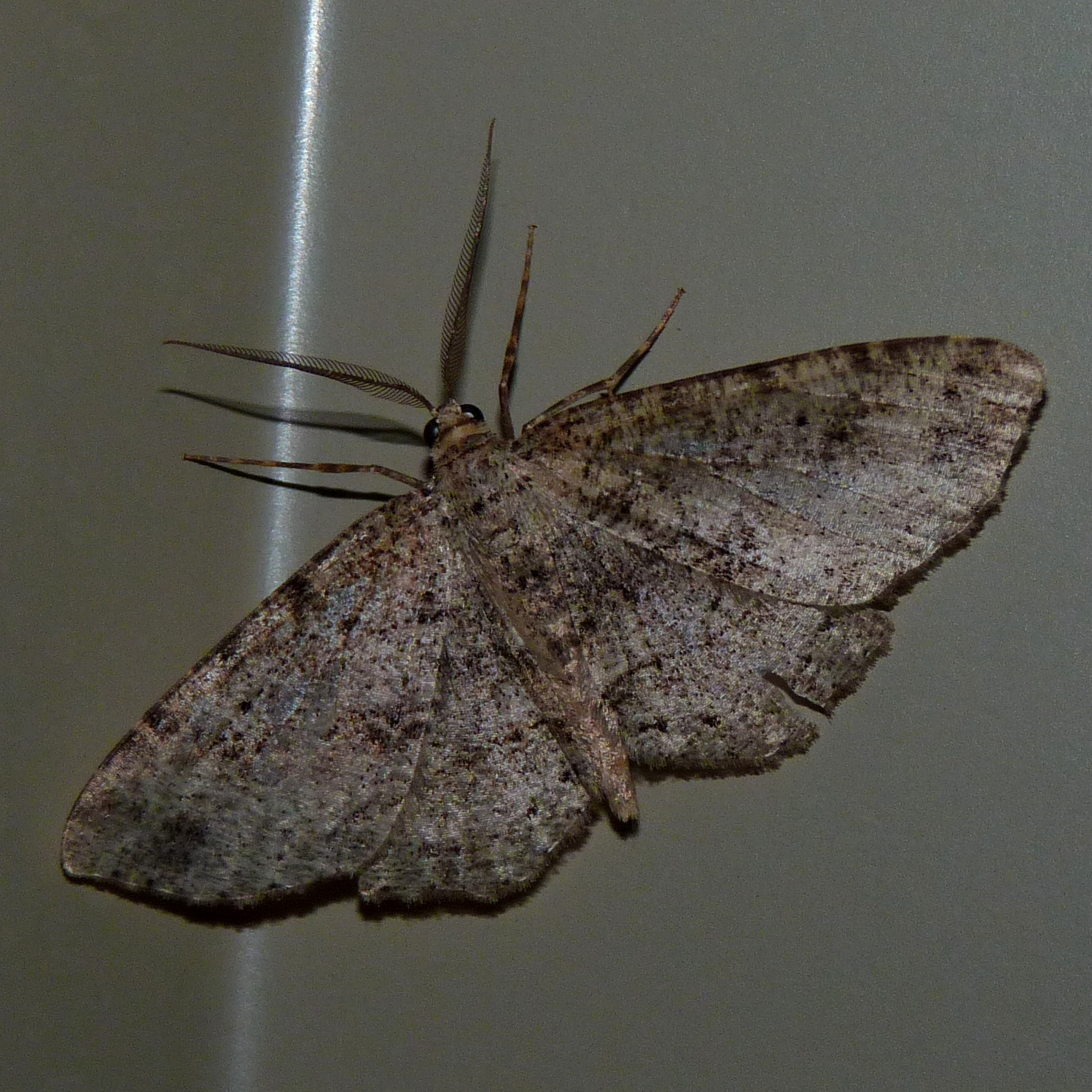

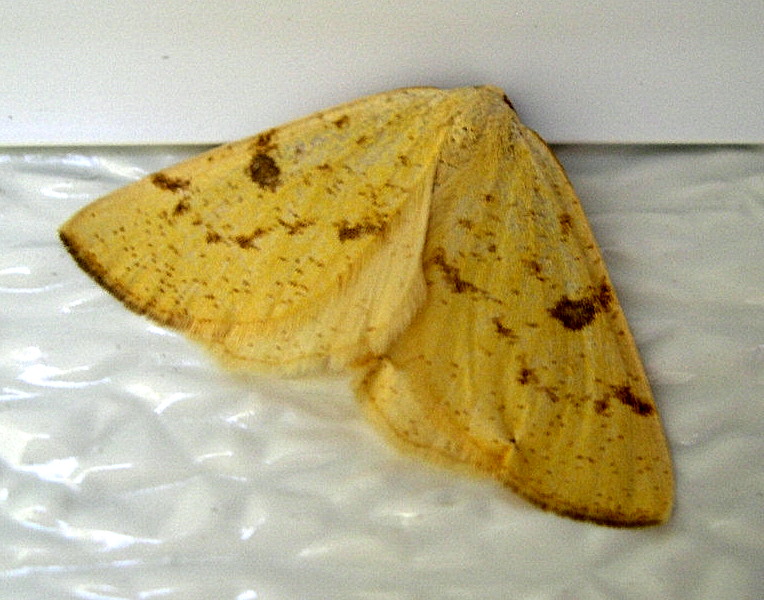

Scientific classification
- Kingdom: Animalia
- Phylum: Arthropoda
- Clade: Pancrustacea
- Class: Insecta
- Order: Lepidoptera
- Family: Geometridae
- Tribe: Boarmiini
- Genus: Hesperumia; Packard, 1873

Synonyms
- Ultralcis McDunnough, 1920

= Hesperumia =

Genus of moths

Hesperumia is a genus of moths in the family Geometridae. The genus was described by Packard in 1873.

== Species ==
- Hesperumia sulphuraria Packard, 1873
- Hesperumia fumosaria Comstock, 1937
- Hesperumia latipennis (Hulst, 1896)
- Hesperumia fumida (Warren, 1904)
