= Pine Creek Lake =

Lake in Oklahoma, USA

- Location within Oklahoma Location within the United States
- Location: McCurtain and Pushmataha Counties, Oklahoma
- Coordinates: 34°06′30″N 95°06′00″W
- River sources: Little River (Red River)
- Basin countries: United States
- Managing agency: U.S. Army Corps of Engineers
- Built: 1969
- Surface area: 3,750 acres (15.2 km^{2})
- Water volume: 53,750 acre-feet (66,300,000 m^{3})
- Shore length^{1}: 79 miles (127 km)
- Surface elevation: 438 feet (134 m)
- Settlements: Valiant, Oklahoma
- ^{1} Shore length is not a well-defined measure.

Pine Creek Lake is a lake in McCurtain County and Pushmataha County, Oklahoma, USA. It is 8 miles (13 km) north of Valliant, Oklahoma. It is located east of Rattan and north of Sobol.

The lake, which was begun in 1963 and became operational built in 1969, impounds the waters of Little River, Pine Creek, and Turkey Creek. It is managed by the U.S. Army Corps of Engineers for flood control, water supply, fish and wildlife, and recreational purposes. The adjacent Pine Creek Wildlife Management Area extends this mission.

== Lake details ==
Pine Creek Lake comprises 3,750 acres (15.2 km^{2}) of area and 74 miles (119 km) of shoreline. Normal pool elevation is 438 feet (134 m) above sea level. Its flood pool capacity is 465,780 acre-feet (574,530,000 m^{3}), at which time its flood pool is at an elevation of 480 feet (150 m) above sea level. Normal pool capacity is 53,750 acre-feet (66,300,000 m^{3}).

== Dam details ==
The dam is a rolled earth embankment, with a length of 7,712 feet (2,351 m) and a height of 124 feet (38 m) above the streambed. The total length of the dam, dike and spillway is 22,470 feet (6.85 km). There is an uncontrolled saddle spillway, that is a gravity ogee weir. The design capacity of the spillway is 246,000 cubic feet (7,000 m^{3}) per second.

Pine Creek Lake divides the Little River into upper and lower reaches. It is one of two impoundments on the river, the other being Millwood Lake in Little River County, Arkansas.

The wildlife management area covers10,280 acres (41.6 km^{2}) and is adjacent to Little River and Pine Creek Lake.
