= Symphoricarpos sinensis =

Scientific classification
- Kingdom: Plantae
- Clade: Tracheophytes
- Clade: Angiosperms
- Clade: Eudicots
- Clade: Asterids
- Order: Dipsacales
- Family: Caprifoliaceae
- Genus: Symphoricarpos
- Species: S. sinensis

Binomial name
- Symphoricarpos sinensis Rehder 1911

Species of shrub

Symphoricarpos sinensis is an uncommon Chinese species of shrubs in the honeysuckle family. It has been found in the Provinces of Gansu, Guangxi, Hubei, Shaanxi, Sichuan, and Yunnan in central and southern China.

== Habitat and range ==
Symphoricarpos sinensis is an erect shrub up to 250 cm (8 1/3 feet) tall. It has 3 to 6 pairs of white, bell-shaped flowers and dark blue fruits with waxy coatings.
