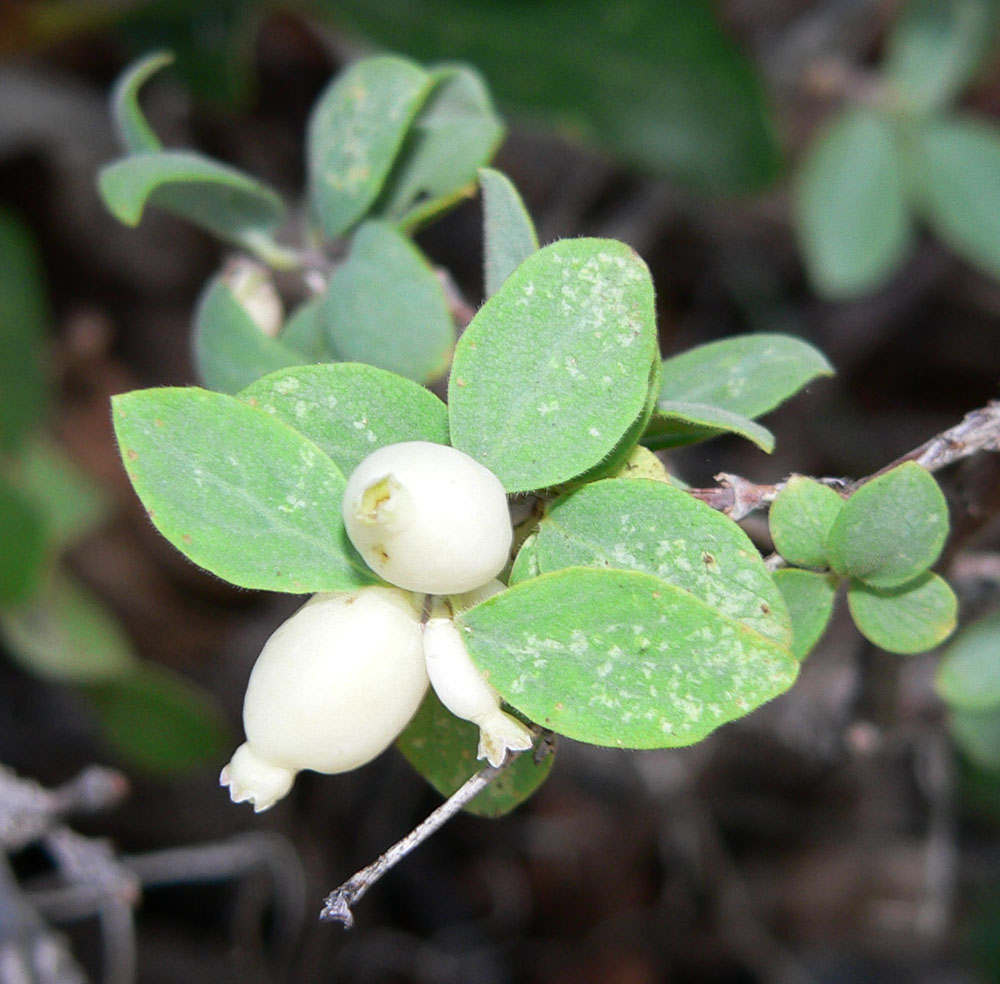

Conservation status
- Secure (NatureServe)

Scientific classification
- Kingdom: Plantae
- Clade: Tracheophytes
- Clade: Angiosperms
- Clade: Eudicots
- Clade: Asterids
- Order: Dipsacales
- Family: Caprifoliaceae
- Genus: Symphoricarpos
- Species: S. oreophilus

Binomial name
- Symphoricarpos oreophilus A.Gray

Synonyms
- Symphoricarpos rotundifolius var. oreophilus (A. Gray) M.E. Jones; Symphoricarpos utahensis Rydb.

= Symphoricarpos oreophilus =

Species of flowering plant

Symphoricarpos oreophilus is a North American species of flowering plant in the Caprifoliaceae, or honeysuckle family, known by the common name mountain snowberry.

== Description ==
Symphoricarpos oreophilus is a deciduous shrub growing erect or spreading or trailing. Depending on environmental conditions it may reach 30 centimetres (12 in) to 1.5 metres (5 ft) in mature height. The fruit is a white drupe containing two nutlets, each of which contains a seed. The plant grows from a rhizome. It reproduces vegetatively by sprouting from the rhizome and by layering, and sexually via seed.

== Distribution and habitat ==
Symphoricarpos oreophilus has a wide distribution in western Canada, the United States, and northwestern Mexico. It is found in mountainous areas such as the Cascades, the Sierra Nevada, the Rockies, and the Sierra Madre Occidental from British Columbia to the Copper Canyon region of Chihuahua, from the coastal states as far inland as the Black Hills, the Oklahoma Panhandle, and trans-Pecos Texas.

It is common in many types of habitat in western North America, and it may dominate some ecosystems, such as sagebrush. It is also an indicator species of certain habitat types where Douglas-fir (Pseudotsuga menziesii), white fir (Abies concolor), ponderosa pine (Pinus ponderosa), subalpine fir (A. lasiocarpa), Gambel oak (Quercus gambelii), and/or quaking aspen (Populus tremuloides) make up the overstory. It grows in all successional stages in pinyon-juniper woodlands. It is usually found in open habitat, as it does not easily tolerate shade. In heavily forested regions it grows in open areas and breaks in the canopy.

== Ecology ==
Many types of animal use this plant for food, especially in the early spring, when it is one of the first plants to bear leaves. Deer, elk, and livestock browse the foliage. Some small mammals use the shrubs for cover. Birds such as the yellow-billed magpie consume the fruits.

== Edibility ==
The saponin-containing berries are inedible to humans.
