= Symphoricarpos acutus =

Scientific classification
- Kingdom: Plantae
- Clade: Tracheophytes
- Clade: Angiosperms
- Clade: Eudicots
- Clade: Asterids
- Order: Dipsacales
- Family: Caprifoliaceae
- Genus: Symphoricarpos
- Species: S. acutus

Binomial name
- Symphoricarpos acutus (A.Gray) Dieck 1888 not Howell 1900

Synonyms
- Symphoricarpos mollis var. acutus A.Gray 1884; Symphoricarpos rotundifolius var. acutus (A.Gray) Frye & Rigg

Species of shrub

Symphoricarpos acutus, the sharpleaf snowberry, is a North American species of trailing shrubs in the honeysuckle family. It is native to the western United States (southern Oregon, western Nevada, and northern California).

Symphoricarpos acutus is a trailing herb less than 30 cm (1 foot) tall. It has pink flowers and white fruits.
