= Hesperumia fumosaria =

Scientific classification
- Domain: Eukaryota
- Kingdom: Animalia
- Phylum: Arthropoda
- Class: Insecta
- Order: Lepidoptera
- Family: Geometridae
- Tribe: Boarmiini
- Genus: Hesperumia
- Species: H. fumosaria

Binomial name
- Hesperumia fumosaria Comstock, 1937

Species of moth

Hesperumia fumosaria is a species of geometrid moth in the family Geometridae. It is found in North America.

The MONA or Hodges number for Hesperumia fumosaria is 6432.

== Subspecies ==
These two subspecies belong to the species Hesperumia fumosaria:

- Hesperumia fumosaria fumosaria
- Hesperumia fumosaria impensa Rindge, 1974
