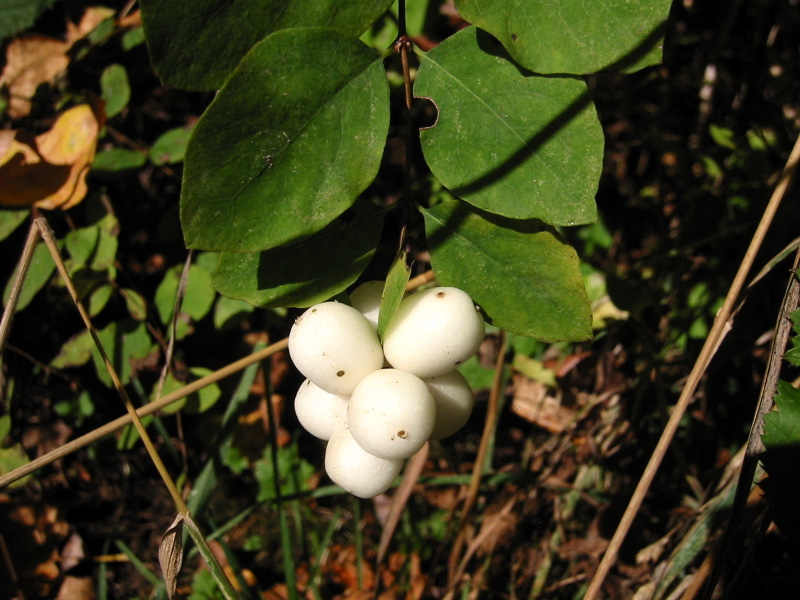
- Common snowberry (S. albus)

Scientific classification
- Kingdom: Plantae
- Clade: Embryophytes
- Clade: Tracheophytes
- Clade: Spermatophytes
- Clade: Angiosperms
- Clade: Eudicots
- Clade: Asterids
- Order: Dipsacales
- Family: Caprifoliaceae
- Subfamily: Caprifolioideae
- Genus: Symphoricarpos; Duhamel 1755

Synonyms
- Symphoricarpus Willd. 1818; Symphoricarpa Necker 1790; Symphoria Pers. 1818; Anisanthus Willd. ex Roem. & Schult. 1819; Margaris DC. 1830 not Griesb. 1866; Deseliaea DC. 1830

= Symphoricarpos =

Genus of flowering plants in the honeysuckle family

Symphoricarpos is a small genus of about 15 species of deciduous shrubs in the family Caprifoliaceae. With the exception of the Chinese coralberry, S. sinensis, which is indigenous to western China, all species are native to North and Central America. The name of the genus is derived from the Ancient Greek words συμφορεῖν (sumphoreîn), meaning "to bear together", and καρπός (karpós), meaning "fruit". It refers to the closely packed clusters of berries the species produces. Species in the genus are known by several common names, including snowberry, waxberry and ghostberry.

Snowberry is a resilient plant able to withstand a variety of conditions. Their deep roots allow them to survive dry seasons, and they have been known to grow in a variety of soil types such as light sandy soil, medium loamy soil and heavier clay soil. Snowberry plants are most commonly found low-to mid elevations, in forests, dry or moist openings, rocky hillsides or near riverbanks and streams. Snowberry plants are also able to grow in a wide range of acidic and basic pHs and sunlight conditions.

== Description ==
Symphoricarpos leaves are 1.5–5 cm (0.59–1.97 in) long, rounded, entire or with one or two lobes at the base. The flowers are small, greenish-white to pink, in small clusters of 5–15 together in most species, solitary or in pairs in some (e.g. S. microphyllus). The fruit is conspicuous, 1–2 cm (0.5–1 in) in diameter, soft, varying from white (e.g. S. albus) to pink (S. microphyllus) to red (S. orbiculatus) and in one species (S. sinensis), blackish purple. When the white berries are broken open, the interior looks like fine, sparkling granular snow. The flesh is spongy and contains two 2–5 mm long, whitish stone seeds. The seeds, which contain endosperm and a small embryo, are egg-shaped and more or less flattened. They have a very tough, hard, impermeable covering, and so are very hard to germinate and may lie dormant for up to ten years.

The white berries create a cracking sound when they are stepped into firm ground.

Species

Species accepted as of August 2015

- Symphoricarpos acutus (A.Gray) Dieck – Sharpleaf snowberry: California, Nevada, Oregon
- Symphoricarpos albus (L.) S.F.Blake – Common snowberry: Canada + US
- Symphoricarpos × chenaultii Rehder – Chenault coralberry
- Symphoricarpos × doorenbosii Krüssm.
- Symphoricarpos guadalupensis Correll – McKittrick's snowberry: western Texas
- Symphoricarpos guatemalensis J.K. Williams: Guatemala
- Symphoricarpos hesperius G.N.Jones – Trailing snowberry: California, Baja California, Oregon, Washington, British Columbia
- Symphoricarpos longiflorus A.Gray – Desert snowberry: southwestern US, northwestern Mexico
- Symphoricarpos microphyllus Kunth – Littleleaf snowberry: Mexico, Guatemala, New Mexico
- Symphoricarpos mollis Nutt. – Creeping snowberry: California
- Symphoricarpos occidentalis Hook. – Western snowberry, Wolfberry: US + Canada
- Symphoricarpos orbiculatus Moench – Coralberry: northeastern Mexico, eastern + central US
- Symphoricarpos oreophilus A.Gray – Mountain snowberry: northern Mexico, western US, western Canada
- Symphoricarpos palmeri G.N.Jones – Palmer's snowberry: Mexico, southwestern US
- Symphoricarpos parishii Rydb.: California, Nevada, Baja California
- Symphoricarpos rotundifolius A.Gray – Round-leaved snowberry: Mexico, southwestern US
- Symphoricarpos sinensis – Chinese snowberry: China
- Symphoricarpos vaccinioides Rydb. – Roundleaf snowberry: California

== Ecology ==
Snowberry is a hermaphroditic species meaning it contains both male and female reproductive organs. It has the ability to grow via seeds but typically reproduces by releasing shoots from a rhizome. This method of shoot dispersal allows snowberry to grow in dense populations of bushes and trees. Snowberry plants also tend to use a reproductive method called layering in which the plant's vertical stems will wilt and droop until they touch surrounding soil. Upon making contact with soil, roots will begin to form. Snowberry plants are resilient and studies have proved they are able to tolerate dormant seasonal fires. These fires actually encourage the snowberry plant's layering reproductive method, as the regeneration of new plants results in an increased number of stems and therefore more opportunities for layering to occur.

Common snowberry (S. albus) is a resilient plant that thrives in dry woodland conditions. Its berries ripen during fall and last through winter, making it an important winter food source for quail and grouse. However, the berries are considered poisonous to humans. The berries contain the isoquinoline alkaloid chelidonine, as well as other alkaloids. Ingesting the berries causes mild symptoms of vomiting, dizziness, and slight sedation in children.

== Cultivation ==
Common snowberry is a popular ornamental shrub in gardens, grown for its decorative white fruit and wildlife gardening. It is also a useful landscaping plant due to its extreme versatility—tolerating sun, shade, heat, cold, drought, and inundation.

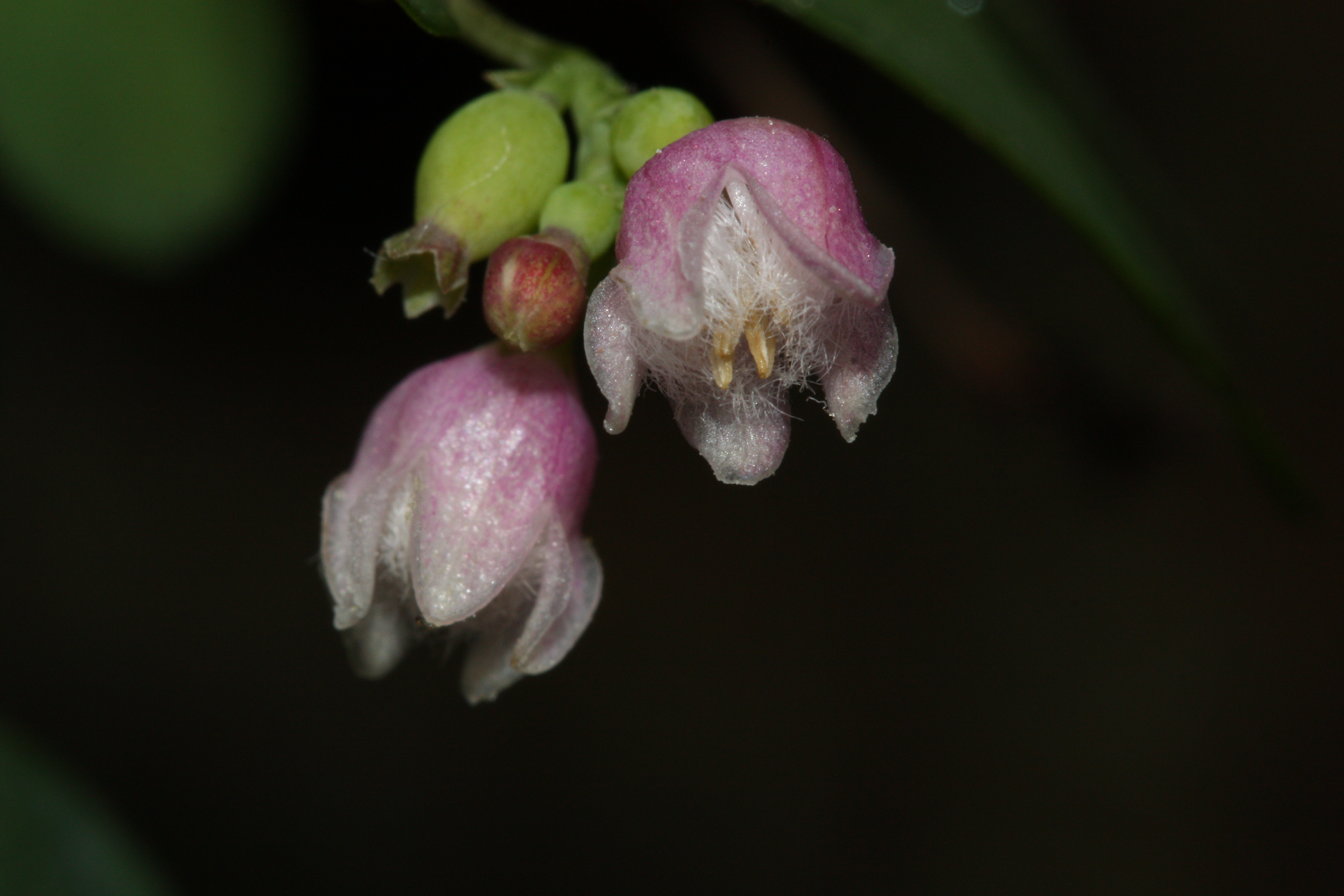
Symphoricarpos albus flowers

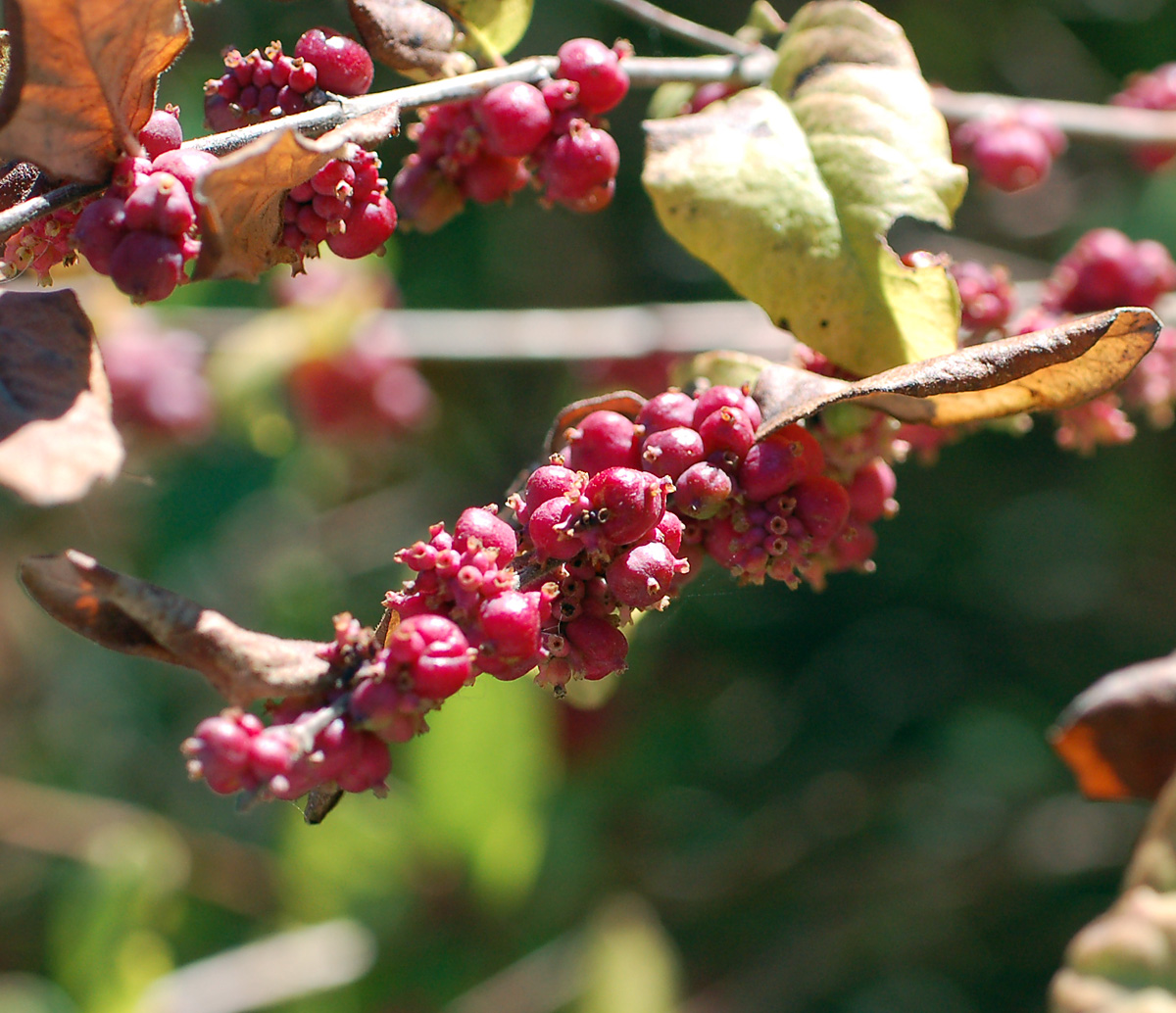
Symphoricarpos orbiculatus fruits, mid-October

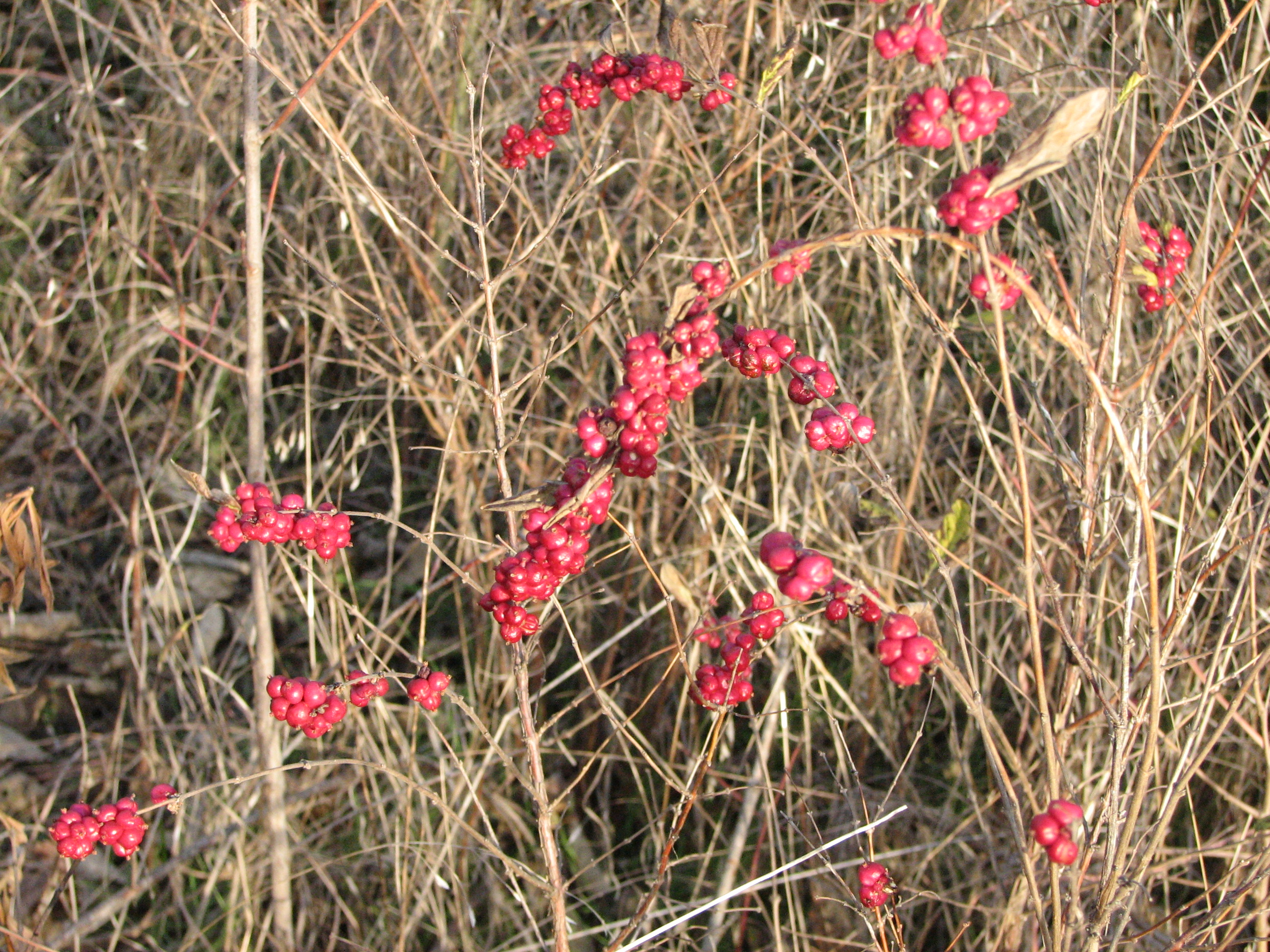
Symphoricarpos orbiculatus fruits in autumn

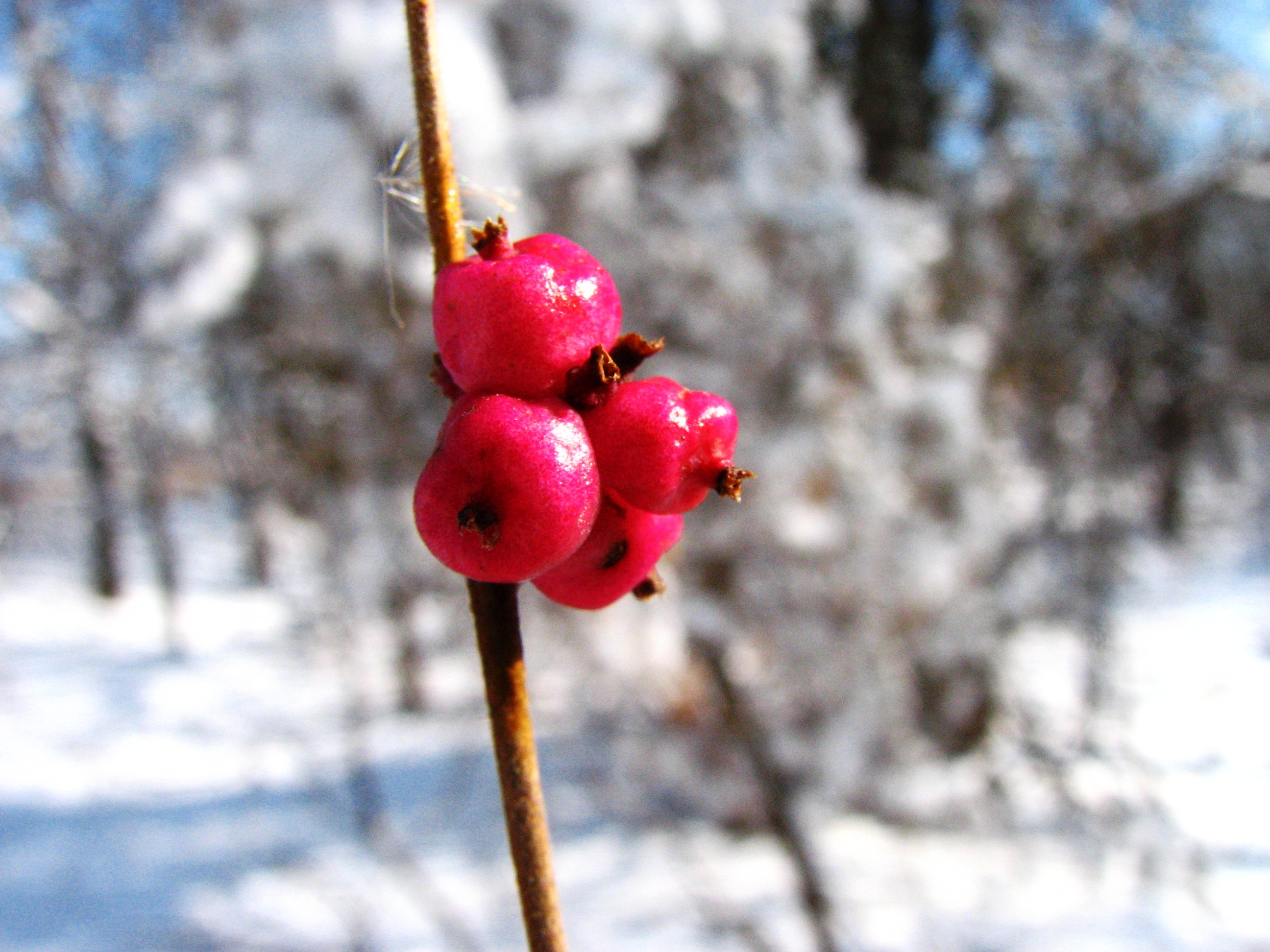
Symphoricarpos orbiculatus fruits in winter

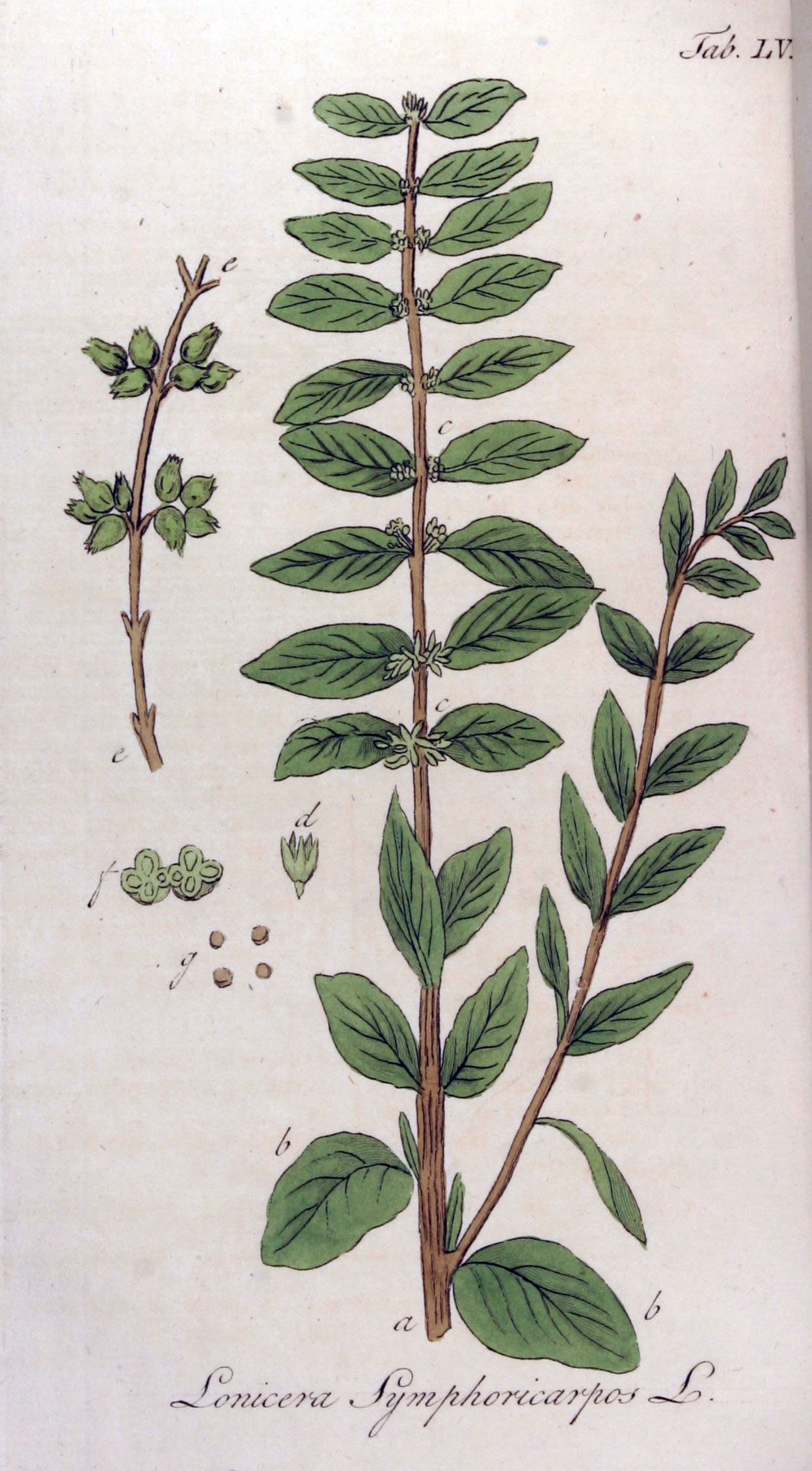
Symphoricarpos vulgaris, drawn by Eersde Deel, 1813

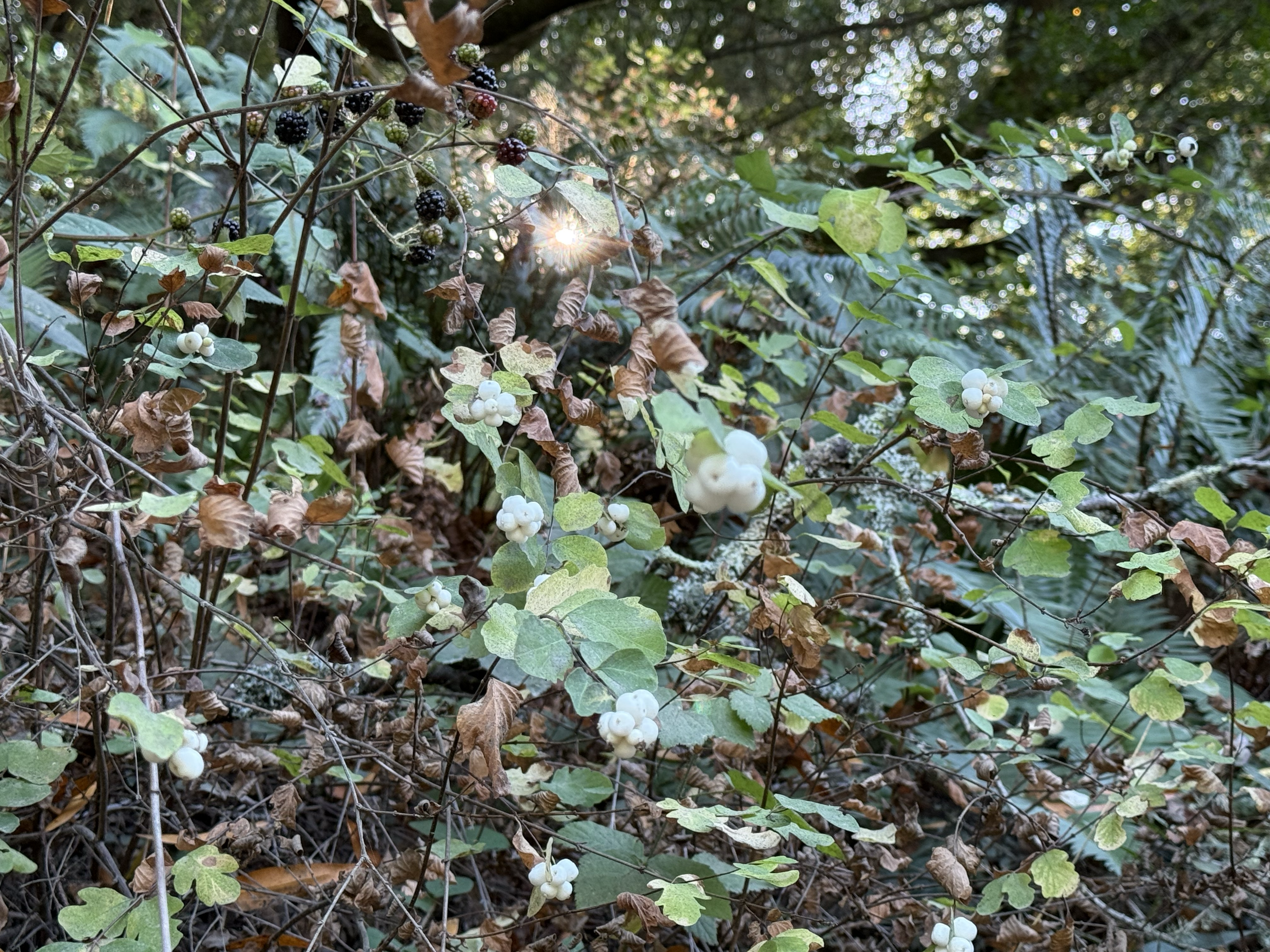
Symphoricarpos albus fruits in northern California, mid-September

== Medicinal uses ==
Due to their low saponin content, snowberry was a common medicinal treatment used by several North American Indigenous tribes. Snowberry contains low concentrations of saponins, which are anti-carcinogenic and anti-inflammatory. Saponins have also been proven to help with immune function and decrease cholesterol. Saponins can be extremely toxic if consumed in excess, but are typically applied externally or consumed in concentrations too low to inflict damage. Its toxic effects can also be reduced through cooking.

The snowberry plant is known to be disinfectant, laxative, diuretic and has the ability to reduce fever. Native Americans found several uses for the snowberry plant. Snowberry leaves were chewed up and used in a poultice to treat external wounds. Its berries were used for a number of applications including as an eyewash, as an antiperspirant, a diarrhea remedy, and was also rubbed on the skin as a treatment for burns, rashes, warts, sores, cuts and other external wounds. Snowberry stems were boiled and their essence was extracted to be used for stomach problems, menstrual pain, and as a soap. Weaker dilutions were used for children, meanwhile stronger concentrations were used as a disinfectant to clean open sores. Snowberry bark was also boiled, its essence extracted and used to treat sexually transmitted diseases and urinary dysfunction issues. Its roots were commonly used in the treatment of fever, stomach ache, common cold, and even tuberculosis. In California, the Coastal Miwok used pounded snowberry root to treat ailments such as the cold.

Due to the content of saponins in the berries, some tribes of the Pacific Northwest used the crushed fruits to stun fish in lakes and rivers in order to facilitate the harvesting of fish. The saponins, which are not toxic to humans, interfere with oxygen absorption in the gills.

== Other uses ==
In Ireland, children use the berries for play, bursting the berries close to each other's ears. The berries are known as "billy busters".
