= Three Rivers Wildlife Management Area =

Protected area in Oklahoma, United States

- Three Rivers WMA
- IUCN category V (protected landscape/seascape)
- Location within Oklahoma
- Location: Pushmataha and McCurtain Counties, Oklahoma
- Nearest city: Broken Bow
- Coordinates: 34°22′46″N 94°42′10″W
- Area: 185,199 acres (749.47 km^{2})
- Governing body: Private land managed by the Oklahoma Department of Wildlife Conservation (ODWC)

Three Rivers Wildlife Management Area (Three Rivers WMA) is a protected area of Weyerhaeuser privately owned land, located in Pushmataha and McCurtain Counties, Oklahoma, totaling 185,199 acres (74,947 ha). Three rivers, Upper Mountain Fork, Eagle Fork, and Glover Rivers (the only free-flowing river in Oklahoma) run through the WMA, which is where the name is derived from.

== History ==
In November 1998, The Oklahoman, detailed the Three Rivers Wildlife Management Area as the newest 450,000 acres (180,000 ha) hunting destination, along with the Honobia Creek Wildlife Management Area for a total of 700,000 acres (280,000 ha). The WMA was listed as 203,246 acres (82,251 ha) but 30,000 acres (12,000 ha) was removed.

== Location ==
The WMA is adjacent to and shares boundaries with the Honobia Creek WMA, Ouachita WMA (that includes the McCurtain County Wilderness Area), Beavers Bend State Park, Broken Bow Reservoir, and the Ouachita National Forest. Located north of west of Oklahoma State Highway 259 (north of Broken Bow), the WMA includes pine and hardwood forests. The WMA includes the Upper Mountain Fork, Glover, and Eagle Fork rivers, which is where the WMA received its name. Approximately five miles of the Glover River runs through the WMA. In 2025, the Oklahoma Senate heard from experts on designating the Glover River as a scenic river under the 1970 Oklahoma Scenic Rivers Act.

== Lease ==
In 2025, a three-year lease was signed with landowners for Honobia Creek and Three Rivers Wildlife Management Areas. A five-year lease was approved for a new 19,000 acres (7,700 ha) Herron Family WMA.
