= Eufaula Wildlife Management Area =

Protected area in Oklahoma, United States

- Eufaula WMA
- IUCN category V (protected landscape/seascape)
- Location within Oklahoma
- Location: Latimer, McIntosh, Pittsburg and Okmulgee Counties
- Nearest city: Broken Bow
- Coordinates: 35°28′18″N 95°49′51″W
- Area: 48,614 acres (196.73 km^{2})
- Governing body: United States Army Corps of Engineers and the Oklahoma Department of Wildlife Conservation (ODWC)

The Eufaula Wildlife Management Area (Eufaula WMA) is separated into distinct units of protected areas located around Lake Eufaula in Latimer, McIntosh, Pittsburg and Okmulgee Counties, Oklahoma, totaling 48,614 acres (19,673 ha).

== Sections ==
The WMA is divided into six Noncontiguous sections or arms.

=== Gaines Creek ===
Gaines Creek: The southernmost arm of Lake Eufaula WMA, the Gaines River Bifurcates, and the WMA follow both the Gaines Creek to the east/southeast and Brushy Creek to the southwest, which includes some of Peaceable Creek. The mountains around the arm include Fish Trap Mountain, Pocahontas Mountain, and Bald Knob to the west, Buffalo Mountain and James Collins Wildlife Management Area to the north, Robbers Cave Wildlife Management Area to the northeast, Hulsay Mountain, Sans Bois Mountains, and Blue Mountain range, to the west and south along with Number Ten Mountain and Round Top Mountain. The towns and communities include Adamson to the north, Gowen, the community of Centerville, Hartshorne, Haileyville, and the community of Dow around the southern end.

=== North Canadian ===
North Canadian: Overlaps a small piece of Lake Eufaula State Park to the east with State Highway 150 running from I-40 south through Brush Hill, the state park, and intersecting US 69. The arm follows the upper reaches of the North Canadian River.

=== Deep Fork ===
The Deep Fork arm is north of the North Canadian arm. The Central Unit, Deep Fork Eufaula Wetland Development Unit (WDU), one of twenty-nine such units in Oklahoma, is maintained for habitat and refuge resources for waterfowl and migratory birds. The area is usually seasonally artificially flooded except during times when the area is naturally flooded or there are mechanical issues.

Other sections or arms:

- South Canadian
- Duchess Creek
- Mill Creek
