= Beaver River Wildlife Management Area =

Protected area in Oklahoma, United States

- Beaver River WMA
- IUCN category V (protected landscape/seascape)
- Location within Oklahoma
- Location: Beaver County, Oklahoma
- Nearest city: Southeast of Turpin
- Coordinates: 36°48′50″N 100°40′13″W
- Area: 18,623.51 acres (75.3667 km^{2})
- Governing body: Oklahoma Department of Wildlife Conservation (ODWC)

Beaver River Wildlife Management Area (Beaver River WMA) is a 18,624-acre (7,537 ha) protected area in Beaver County, Oklahoma. The McFarland Unit, a section of the management area, has an additional area of 5,110.32-acre (2,068.07 ha).

== Ecology ==
Located near the town of Turpin, the management area consists mostly of grassland, with a considerable amount of sand plum, sagebrush, buffalo grass, and salt cedar. Along the Beaver River, trees such as American Elm, Hackberry, and Cottonwood are present.

== McFarland Unit ==
BeaverRiver WMA includes the McFarland Unit, which has an additional 5,110.32 acres (2,068.07 ha) with the Beaver River running through sections of the protected area.

== Conservation ==
The northern population of the Lesser prairie-chicken (Tympanuchus pallidicinctus), with habitat in Oklahoma (especially Beaver County and the WMA), Colorado, Kansas, and a portion of northern Texas, is considered threatened under the Endangered Species Act of 1973.
