= Symphoricarpos microphyllus =

Scientific classification
- Kingdom: Plantae
- Clade: Tracheophytes
- Clade: Angiosperms
- Clade: Eudicots
- Clade: Asterids
- Order: Dipsacales
- Family: Caprifoliaceae
- Genus: Symphoricarpos
- Species: S. microphyllus

Binomial name
- Symphoricarpos microphyllus (Humb. & Bonpl. ex Schult.) Kunth 1820

Synonyms
- List: Symphoricarpos microphyllus Kunth; Anisanthus microphyllus Humb. & Bonpl. ex Schult. 1819; Chiococca axillaris Sessé & Moc.; Chiococca barbigera D.Dietr.; Descliaea leucocarpa Moc. & Sessé ex DC.; Descliaea margaritaria Moc. & Sessé ex DC.; Margaris barbigera] DC.; Margaris nudiflora DC.; Symphoria glaucescens (Kunth) Spreng.; Symphoria microphylla (Humb. & Bonpl. ex Schult.) Spreng.; Symphoria montana (Kunth) Spreng.; Symphoricarpos glaucescens Kunth; Symphoricarpos montanus Kunth

Species of flowering plant

Symphoricarpos microphyllus, the pink snowberry, is a North American species of flowering plant in the honeysuckle family. It is widespread across much of Mexico from Chihuahua to Chiapas, and found also in Guatemala, Honduras, and the US State of New Mexico.

Symphoricarpos microphyllusis an erect branching shrub sometimes as much as 3 meters (10 feet) tall, making it the tallest species in the genus. Leaves are up to 25 mm (1 inch) long, dark green on the upper surface but lighter green underneath. It has pink, bell-shaped flowers and white or pale pink fruits.
