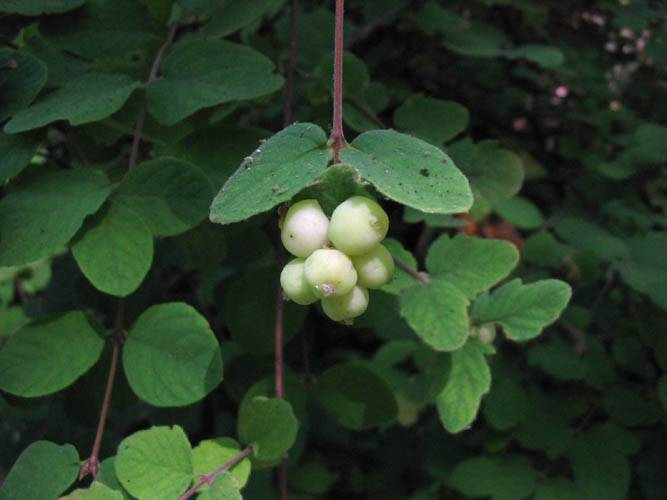

Scientific classification
- Kingdom: Plantae
- Clade: Tracheophytes
- Clade: Angiosperms
- Clade: Eudicots
- Clade: Asterids
- Order: Dipsacales
- Family: Caprifoliaceae
- Genus: Symphoricarpos
- Species: S. mollis

Binomial name
- Symphoricarpos mollis Nutt. 1841

= Symphoricarpos mollis =

Species of shrub

Symphoricarpos mollis, with the common names creeping snowberry, Southern California snowberry, and trip vine, is a shrub in the honeysuckle family.

== Description ==
The plant is a creeping shrub, low growing and straggling, with stems that can reach several feet while the height limited to about 0.5 metres (1 1/2 ft). It reproduces both from via rhizome and seed.

Leaves are opposite. Stems are flexible.

It bears bunches of red or pink rounded, bell-shaped flowers and spherical or bulbous white or pink-tinted fruits measuring about 1 centimetre (1/2 in).

== Distribution and habitat ==
The shrub is found in western North America from British Columbia to California inland to Nevada and Idaho.

It does well in warm climates and can tolerate both intense sun and constant shade. It is a plant of chaparral ecosystems, especially along coastlines.

== Edibility ==
The fruits are inedible. While not generally considered toxic, they are distasteful, having a soapy texture due to the presence of saponins.
