= Symphoricarpos palmeri =

Conservation status
- Apparently Secure (NatureServe)

Scientific classification
- Kingdom: Plantae
- Clade: Tracheophytes
- Clade: Angiosperms
- Clade: Eudicots
- Clade: Asterids
- Order: Dipsacales
- Family: Caprifoliaceae
- Genus: Symphoricarpos
- Species: S. palmeri

Binomial name
- Symphoricarpos palmeri G.N.Jones 1940

Species of flowering plant

Symphoricarpos palmeri, common name Palmer's snowberry, is a North American species of plants in the Honeysuckle Family. It has been found in the southwestern United States (Arizona, Colorado, New Mexico, and western Texas), as well as in the Mexican State of Chihuahua inside Basaseachic Falls National Park.

Symphoricarpos palmeri is a trailing shrub up to 3 meters (10 feet) long, with erect or ascending branches. Flowers are pink, funnel-shaped or tubular. Fruit is white.
