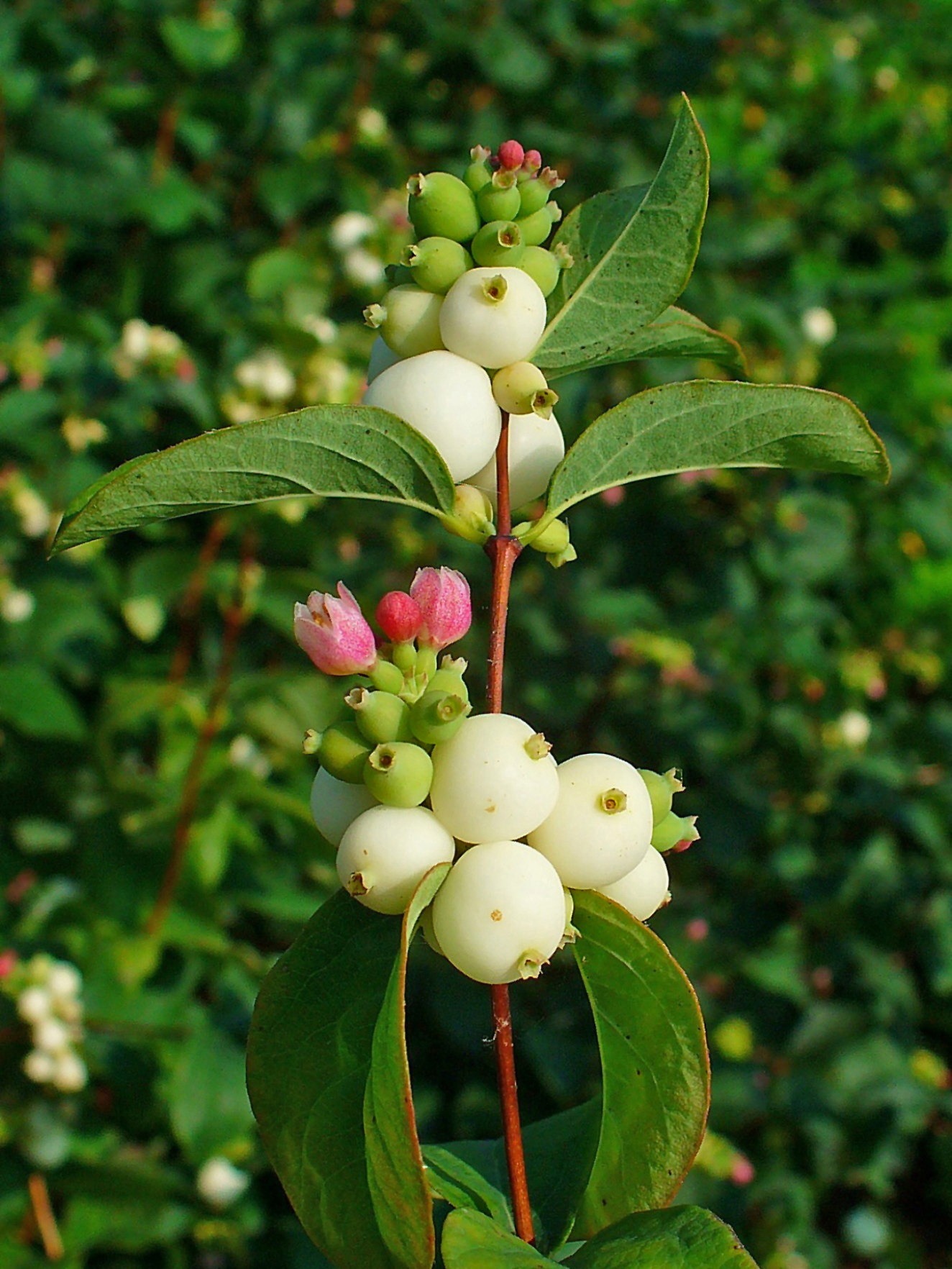

Conservation status
- Secure (NatureServe)

Scientific classification
- Kingdom: Plantae
- Clade: Tracheophytes
- Clade: Angiosperms
- Clade: Eudicots
- Clade: Asterids
- Order: Dipsacales
- Family: Caprifoliaceae
- Genus: Symphoricarpos
- Species: S. albus

Binomial name
- Symphoricarpos albus (L.) S.F.Blake 1914

Synonyms
- Vaccinium album L. 1753; Lonicera alba (L.) Druce; Xylosteon album (L.) Moldenke; Symphoricarpos rivularis Suksd.; Symphoricarpos pauciflorus (J.W. Robbins) Britton

= Symphoricarpos albus =

Species of flowering plant

Symphoricarpos albus is a species of flowering plant in the honeysuckle family known by the common name common snowberry. Native to North America, it is browsed by some animals and planted for ornamental and ecological purposes, but is poisonous to humans.

== Description ==
S. albus is an erect, deciduous shrub that produces a stiff, branching main stem and often several smaller shoots from a rhizome. It can spread and colonise an area to form a dense thicket. It reaches 1–2 metres (3 1/2–6 1/2 feet) in maximum height. The leaves are oppositely arranged on the spreading branches. They are generally oval in shape and vary in size, growing up to 5 centimetres (2 inches) long, or slightly larger on the shoots. The inflorescence is a raceme of up to 16 flowers. Each flower has a small, five-toothed calyx of sepals. The bell-shaped, rounded corolla is approximately 0.5 cm (1/4 in) long and is bright pink in colour. It has pointed lobes at the mouth, and the inside is filled with white hairs. The fruit is a fleshy white berry-like drupe measuring around 1 cm in diameter, containing two seeds. The plant mainly reproduces vegetatively by sprouting from its spreading rhizome, but sometimes via seed. Birds disperse the seeds after they eat the fruit.

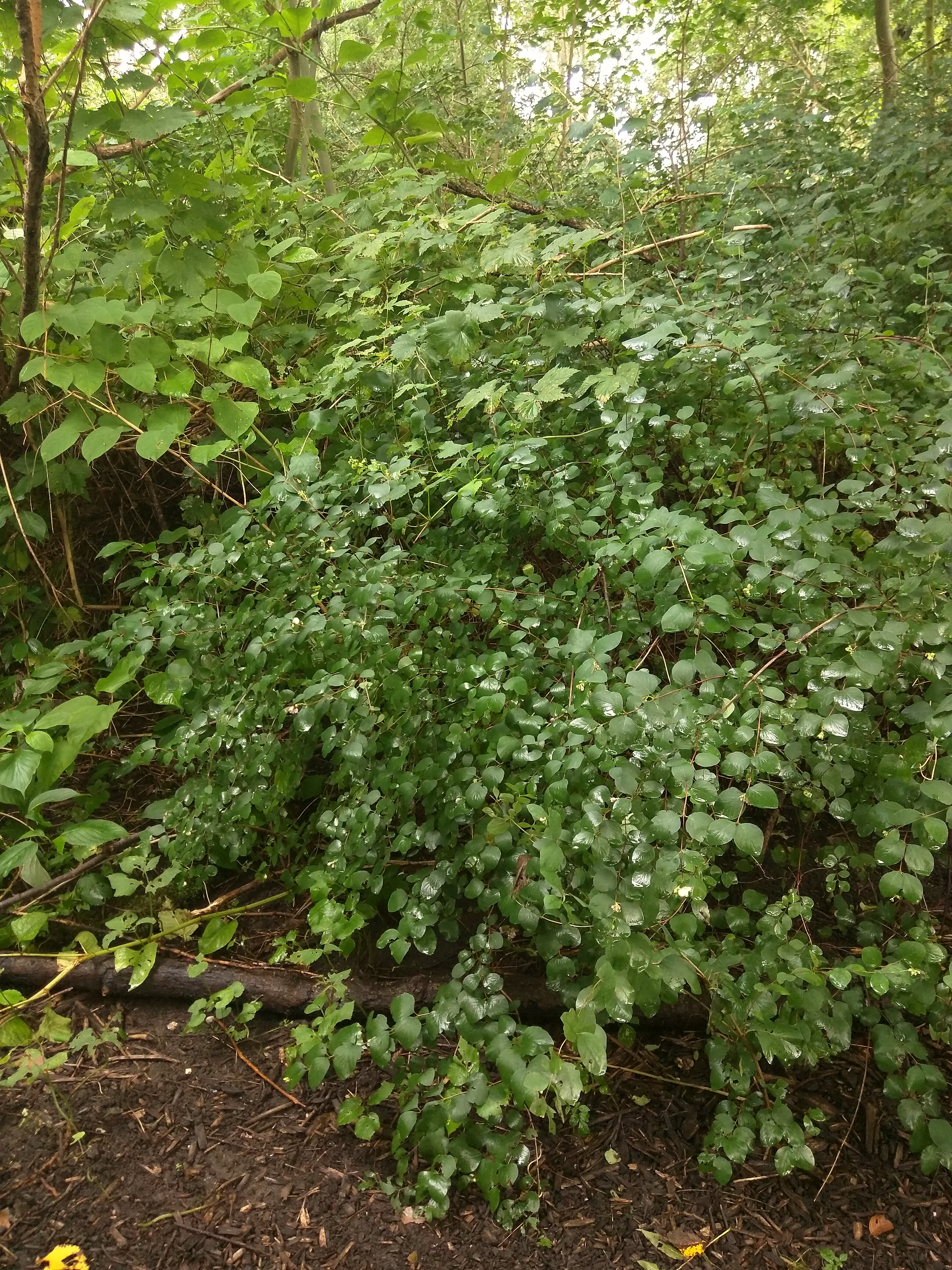
Plant

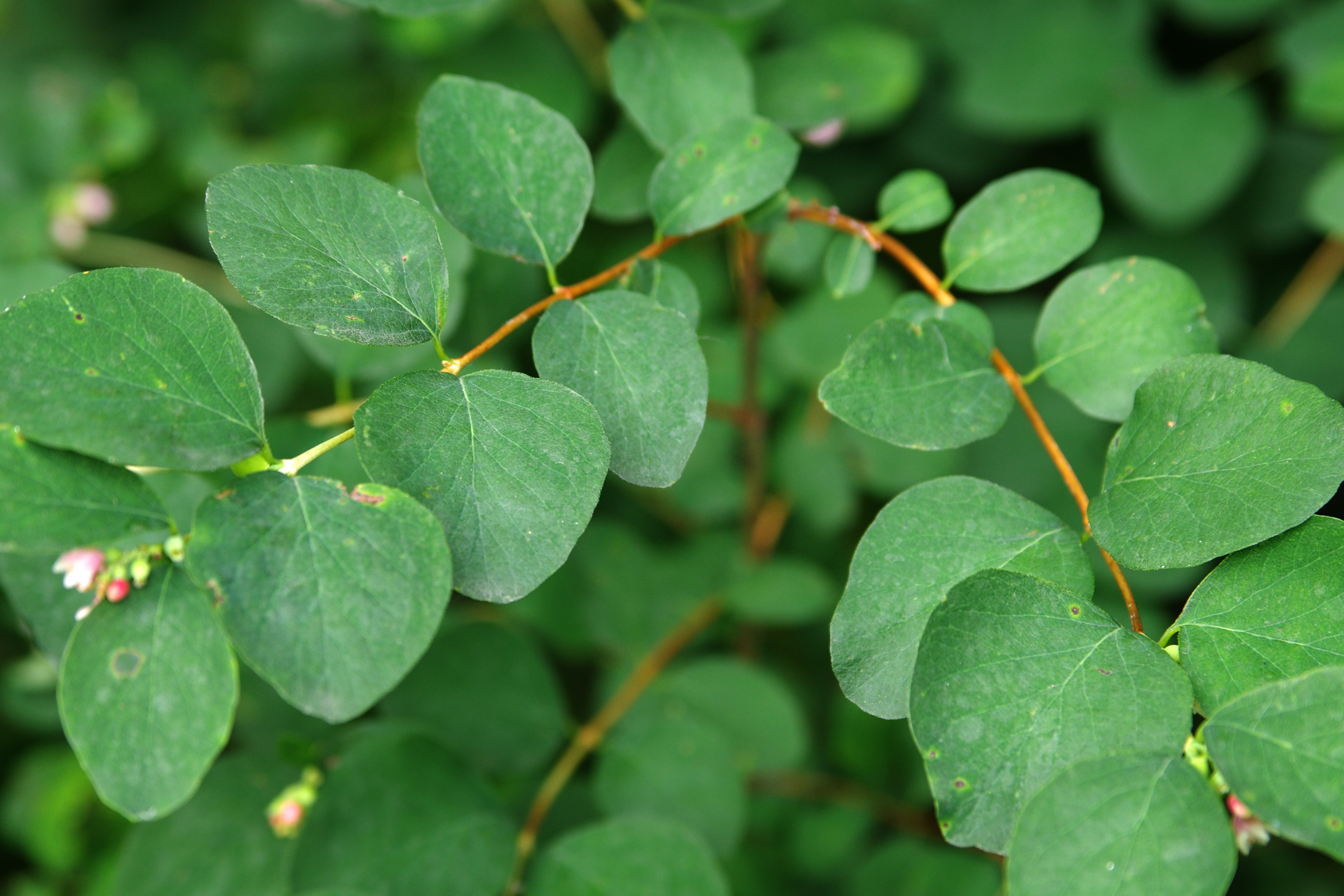
Leaves

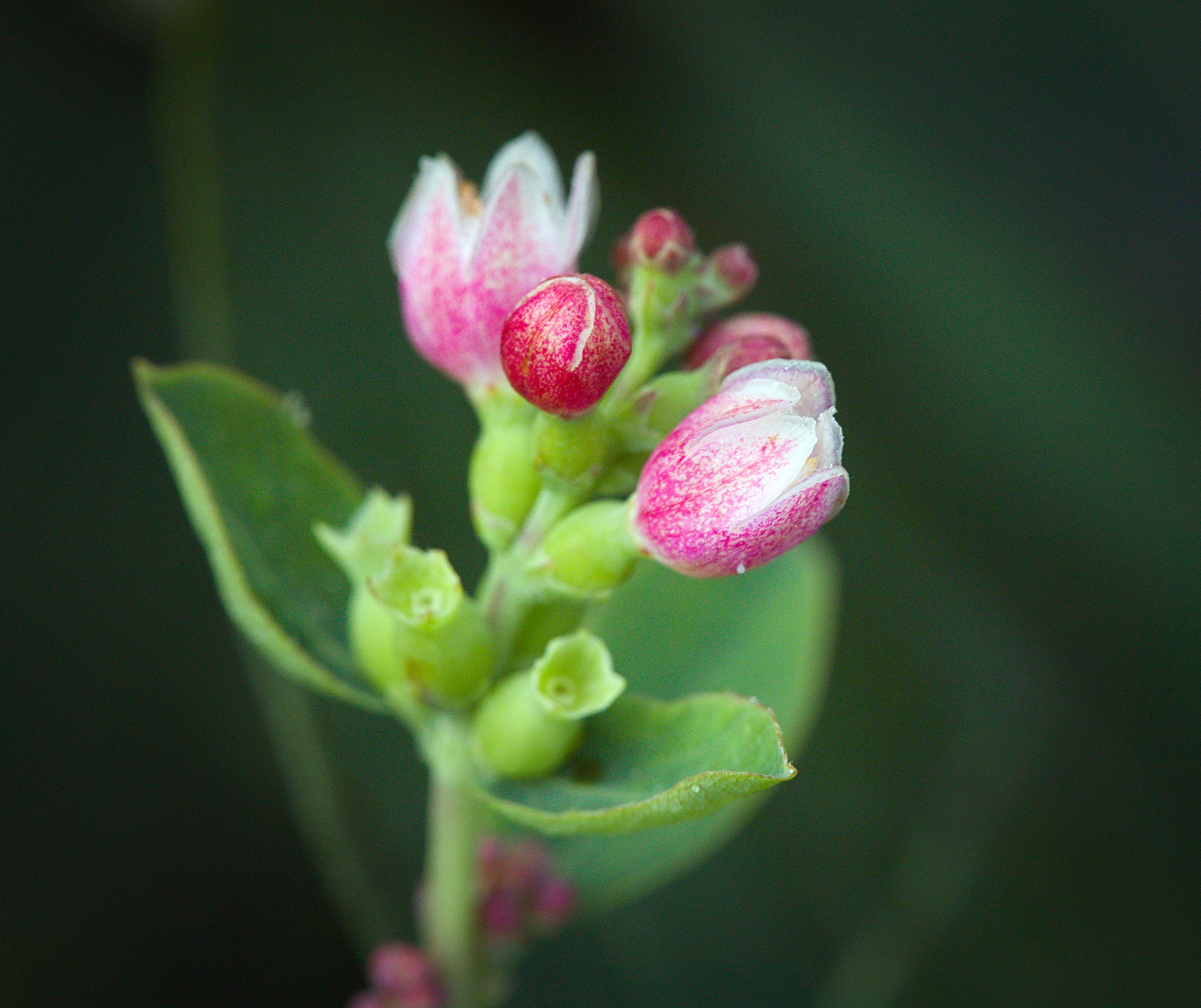
Buds

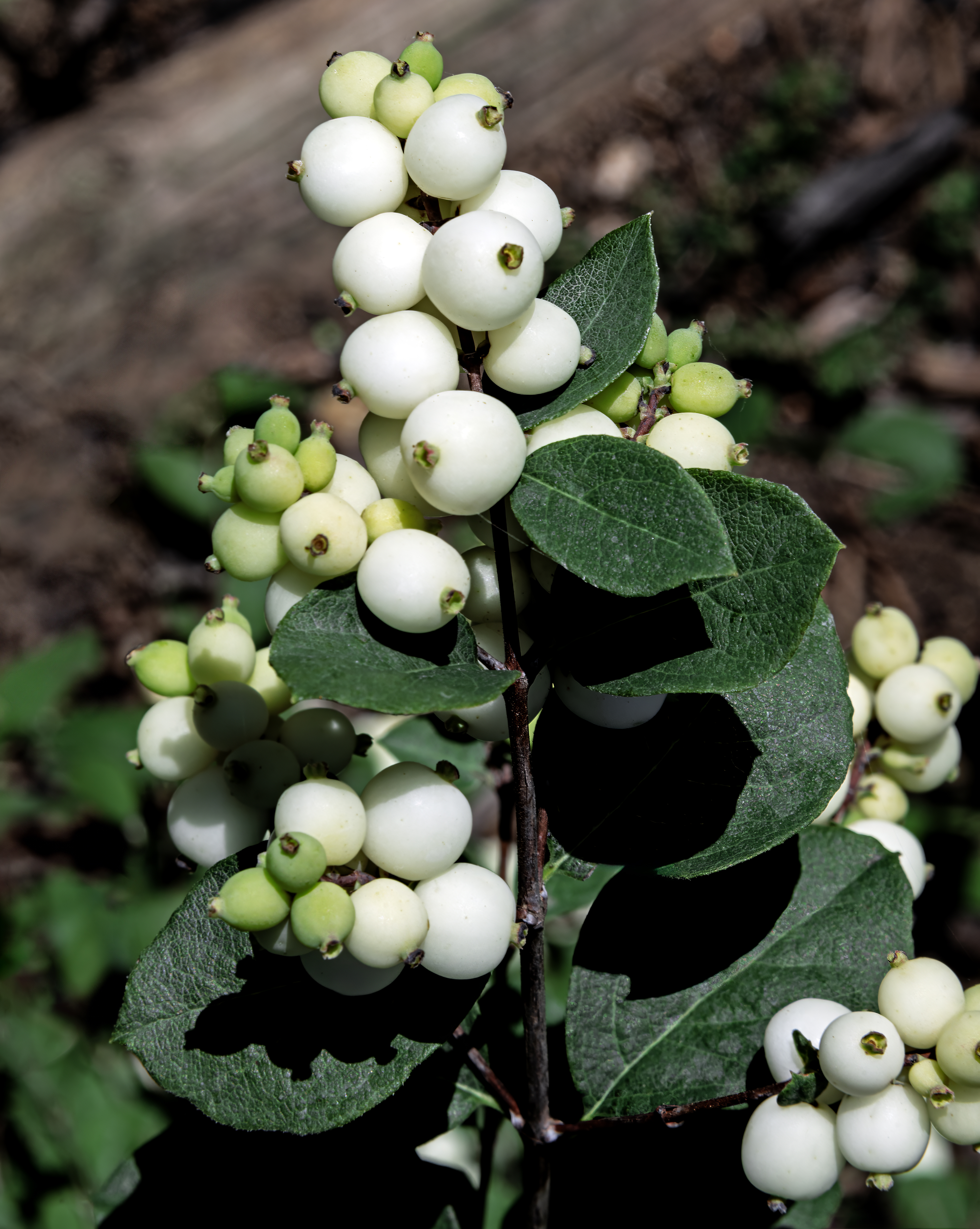
Fruit

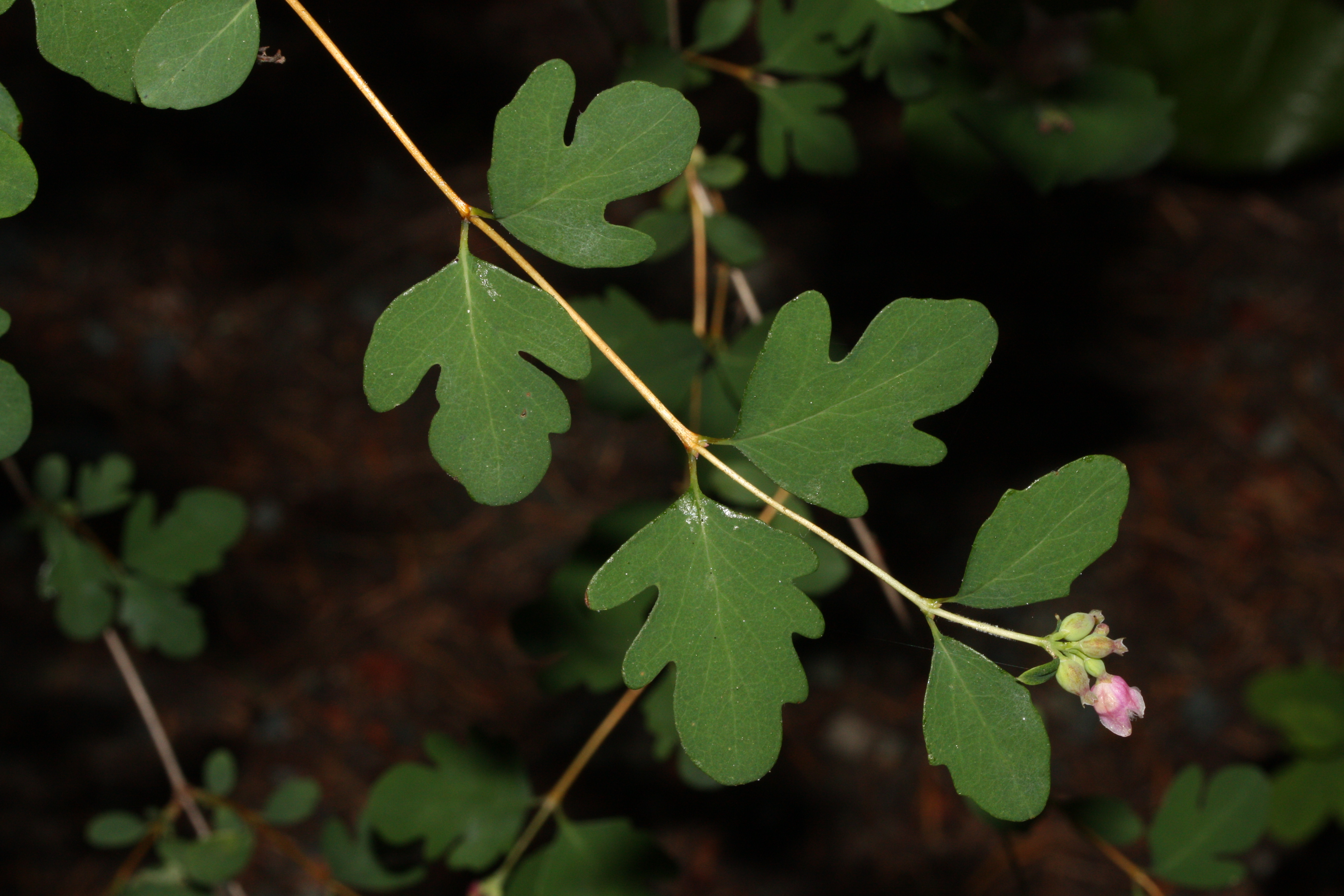
S. albus var. laevigatus

== Varieties ==
There are two varieties:

- S. albus var. albus, native to eastern North America
- S. albus var. laevigatus, native to the Pacific coast. It is a larger shrub, up to 2 m (6 1/2 ft) tall, with slightly larger fruit. Some botanists treat it as a distinct species, Symphoricarpos rivularis.

== Distribution and habitat ==
S. albus occurs across much of Canada and the northern and western United States.

It grows in shady and moist mountain and forest habitat, in woodlands and on floodplains and riverbanks. It can grow in a wide variety of habitat types. It is naturalized in parts of Britain, where it has been planted as an ornamental and cover for game animals.

== Ecology ==
This shrub is an important food source for a number of animals, including bighorn sheep, white-tailed deer, and grizzly bears. Livestock such as cattle and sheep readily browse it. Many birds and small mammals use it for food and cover. Pocket gophers dig burrows underneath it during the winter.

== Toxicity ==
The fruit and shrub are poisonous to humans, causing vomiting.

== Uses ==
Native Americans used the plant as medicine, soap, and the wood was good for arrow shafts. In Russia, the berries are crushed in the hands and rubbed about for a soothing folk-remedy hand lotion.

This shrub is used for erosion control in riparian areas, and it is planted in ecological restoration projects on disturbed sites, such as abandoned mines. Its white fruits and blue-green foliage made it a popular ornamental plant, planted around old houses from the 1890s to the 1920s, similar to the Vanhoutte spirea or bridal wreath. It is still sold by some large, diverse conventional nurseries and native plant nurseries, and can be found occasionally in modern landscapes. It thrives in full sun or partial shade and in well-drained soil with a pH range of about 6.0 to 8.5. It is easy to transplant thanks to its fibrous, shallow root system. It fares well in U.S. Department of Agriculture hardiness zones of 2 to 7.

The plant is popular among children in Germany, who play with its ripe berries due to the popping sound they make when thrown on the ground. Because of this the plant, and specifically its berries, are also called Knallerbsen in German.
