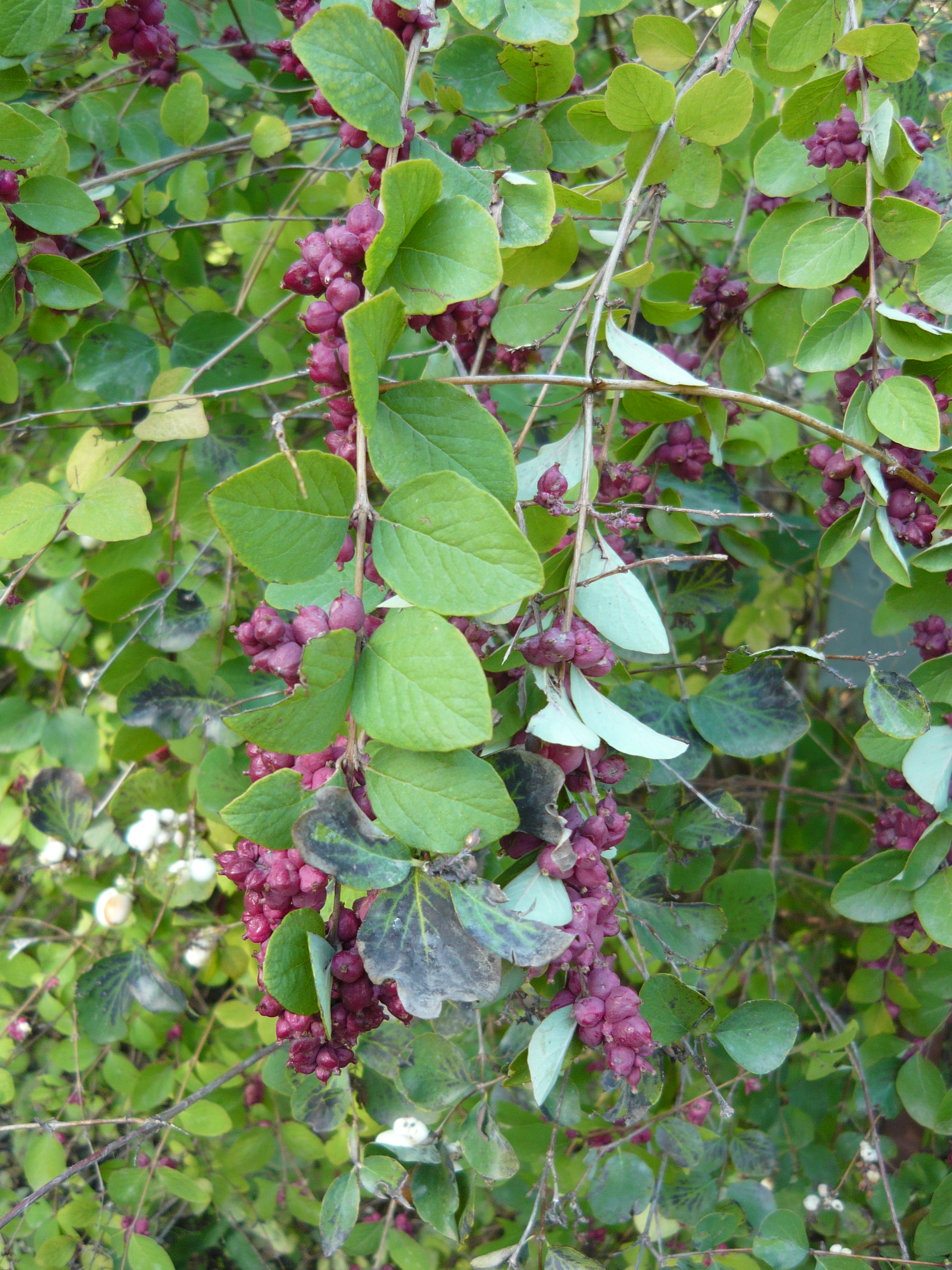

Scientific classification
- Kingdom: Plantae
- Clade: Tracheophytes
- Clade: Angiosperms
- Clade: Eudicots
- Clade: Asterids
- Order: Dipsacales
- Family: Caprifoliaceae
- Genus: Symphoricarpos
- Species: S. orbiculatus

Binomial name
- Symphoricarpos orbiculatus Moench 1794

Synonyms
- Lonicera symphoricarpos L. 1753; Symphoricarpos symphoricarpos (L.) MacMill 1892, invalid name because scientific names are not allowed to have the same first and last parts

= Symphoricarpos orbiculatus =

Coralberry

Species of flowering plant

Symphoricarpos orbiculatus, commonly called coralberry, buckbrush or Indian currant is a woody species of flowering plant in the honeysuckle family.

== Description ==
Symphoricarpos orbiculatus is an erect, rhizomatous shrub. The leaves are typically oval shaped and arranged oppositely along the branches. The leaves are sessile or subsessile. The flowers are greenish-white and borne in verticils in the leaf axils. The fruit is a purple-red drupe with two stones; the drupes are persistent through winter. Symphoricarpos orbiculatus can reach a height of 6 ft (180 cm), but is typically 3–4 ft (90–120 cm). The plant is monoecious, with male and female flowers on the same individual.

== Distribution ==
Symphoricarpos orbiculatus is native to the eastern and central United States as well as central Canada (Ontario) and northeastern Mexico (Coahuila, Nuevo León).
