= List of lakes of Oklahoma =

The following is a list of lakes in Oklahoma located entirely (or partially, as in the case of Lake Texoma) in the state. Swimming, fishing, and/or boating are permitted in some of these lakes, but not all.

Oklahoma has more than 200 lakes created by dams. All lakes listed are man-made. Oklahoma's only natural lakes are oxbow and playa lakes. Oklahoma has sixty-two oxbow lakes at least 10 acres in size. The largest, near the Red River in McCurtain County, is 272 acres.

Playa lakes are found in saucer-shaped depressions in the high plains region. They are usually intermittent, holding water only after rains. Oklahoma has about 600 playa lakes.

== Lakes and reservoirs by size ==
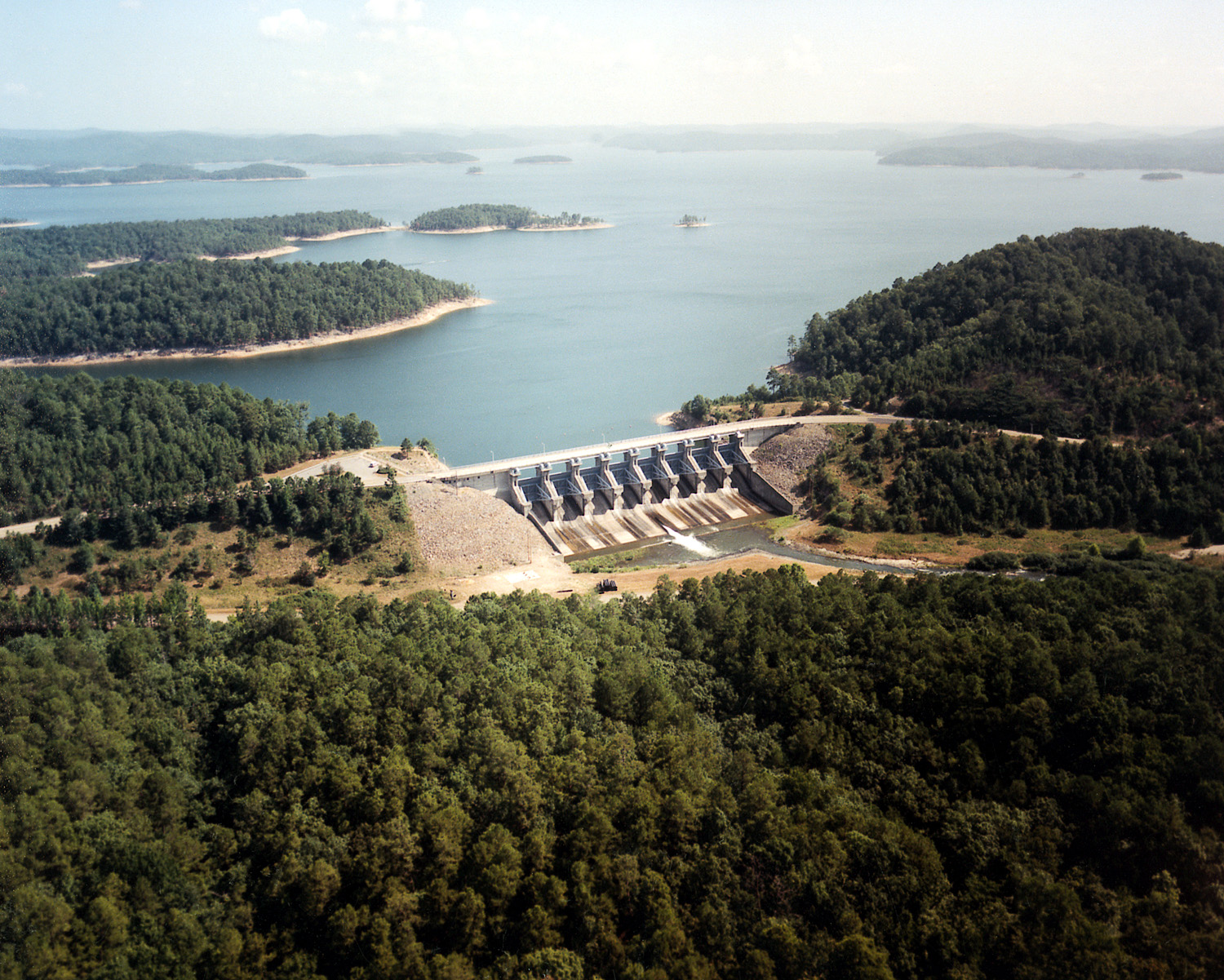
Broken Bow is one of Oklahoma's deepest and most scenic lakes.

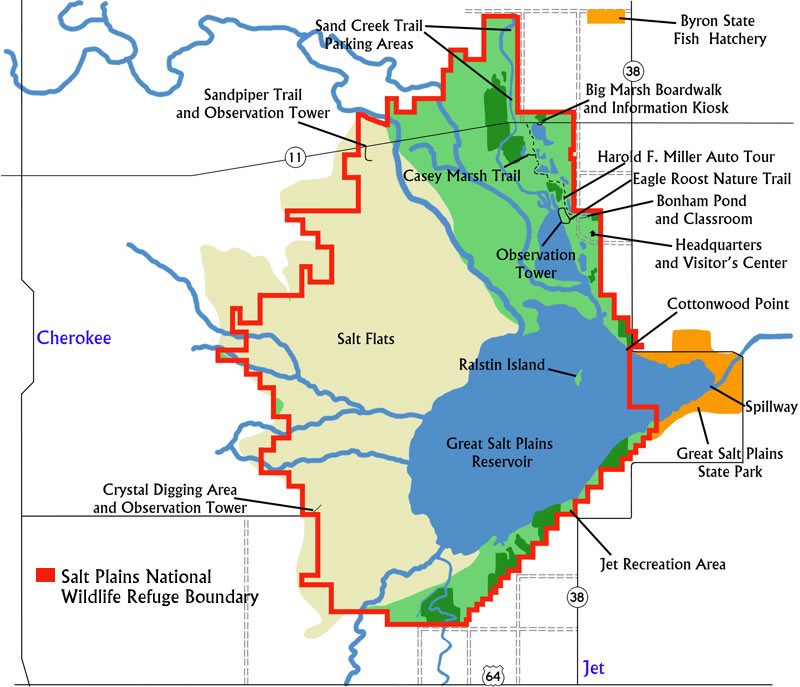
Great Salt Plains Lake is the centerpiece of a wildlife refuge that is a critical way-station for migratory birds.

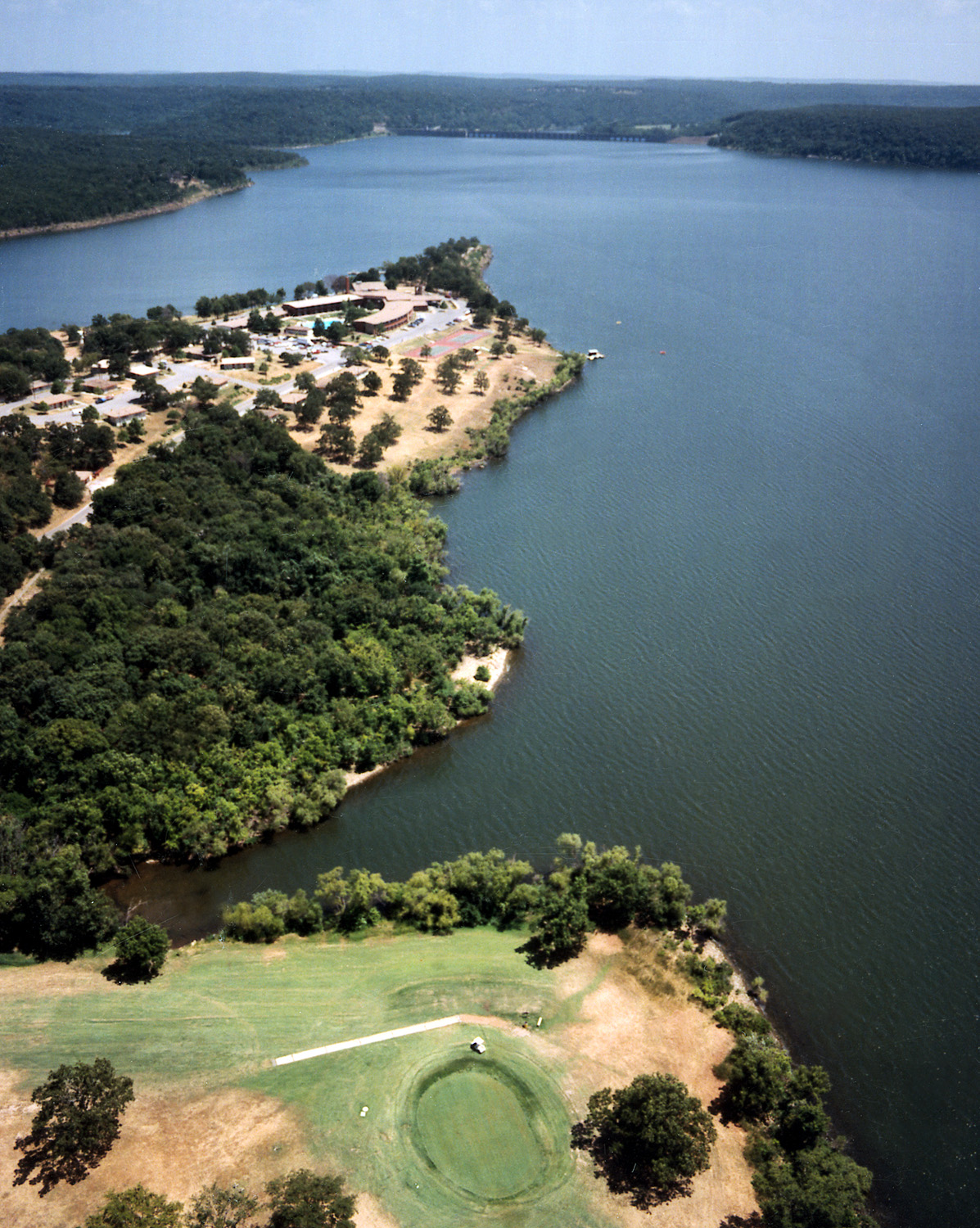
Aerial view of Fort Gibson Lake and Sequoyah State Park. Many large Oklahoma lakes have state parks and lodges. Shorelines of most lakes are publicly owned and accessible to everyone.

Ranked by surface acres, Lake Eufaula is the 34th largest lake in the United States and Lake Texoma is the 38th largest.

Name	Capacity in acre feet (normal pool)	surface acres (normal pool)	average depth	water clarity
Lake Texoma	2,643,000	88,000 acres (35,612 ha)	30 feet (9.1 m)	average to excellent
Eufaula Lake	2,314,000	105,500	22	poor to excellent
Grand Lake o' the Cherokees	1,515,416	41,779	36.3	average to excellent
Broken Bow Lake	918,070	14,200	65	excellent
Tenkiller Ferry Lake	654,100	12,900	51	excellent
Keystone Lake	557,600	23,610	23	average
Oologah Lake	553,400	29,640	19	average
Robert S. Kerr Reservoir	525,700	43,800	12	poor
Kaw Lake	428,600	17,040	25	poor to average
Fort Gibson Lake	355,200	14,900	24	good
Skiatook Lake	322,700	10,190	32	good
Sardis Lake	274,330	13,610	20	average
Waurika Lake	203,100	10,100	20	average
Markham Ferry Reservoir (Lake Hudson)	200,300	10,900	18	average
Webbers Falls Lake	170,100	11,600	15	average
Foss Reservoir	160,145	8,800	18	average
Hugo Lake	157,600	13,250	12	poor
Lake Murray	153,250	5,728	27	excellent
Sooner Lake	149,000	5,400	28	excellent
Lake Altus-Lugert	132,830	6,260	21	fair
Atoka Lake	125,000	5,700	22	poor
Lake Thunderbird	119,600	6,070	20	average
McGee Creek Reservoir	113,930	3,810	30	excellent
Canton Lake	111,310	7,910	14	average
Tom Steed Reservoir	109,276	6,400	-	-
Lake Ellsworth	92,500	5,600	17	fair to poor
Lake Stanley Draper	87,296	2,900	30	good
Fort Cobb Reservoir	80,010	4,100	20	average
Lake Eucha	79,600	2,860	28	excellent
Lake Hefner	75,000	2,500	30	good
Lake of the Arbuckles	72,400	2,350	31	excellent
Wister Lake	61,423	7,300	9	average
Carl Blackwell Lake	61,500	3,370	18	average
Lake Lawtonka	56,574	2,398	24	good
Pine Creek Lake	53,750	3,750	14	good
Lake W. R. Holway, formerly Chimney Rock Lake	48,000	712	67	excellent
Copan Lake	43,400	4,850	9	average
Lake Spavinaw	38,000	1,584	24	excellent
Great Salt Plains Lake	31,240	8,690	4	poor
Hulah Lake	31,160	3,570	9	poor
Arcadia Lake	27,520	1,820	15	average
Chouteau Reservoir	23,840	2,270		
Konawa Reservoir	23,000	1,350	17	excellent
Shawnee Twin Lake, No. l	22,600	1,336	17	good
Fuqua Lake	21,100	1,500	14	average
Lake McMurtry	19,733	1,155	17	average
Birch Lake	19,200	1,137	17	good
Bluestem Lake	17,000	762	22	average
Dripping Springs Lake	16,200	1,150	14	excellent
Bellcow Lake	15,613	1,153	14	average
Lake Overholser	13,526	1,581	16.9 max	fair to poor
Greenleaf Lake	14,720	920	16	good
Lake Ponca	14,440	805	18	good
Okmulgee Lake	14,170	668	21	good
Wes Watkins Reservoir	14,065	1,142	12	good
Fort Supply Lake	13,900	1,820	8	fair to poor
Lake McAlester	13,398	1,521	9	average
Lake R. C. Longmire	13,162	918	14	good
Okemah Lake	13,100	761	17	average
Elmer Thomas Lake	12,000	334	36	excellent
Lake Humphreys	11,900	840	14	good
Chickasha Lake	11,480 (est)	820	14	good
Holdenville Lake	11,000	550	20	average to good

Source: Oklahoma Water Atlas . and , accessed Mar 1, 2011. Some inconsistencies exist between the two sources.

== Lakes geography and administration ==
Public reservoirs in Oklahoma
Reservoir	Nearby town	River basin	Surface acres	Elevation MSL, ft.	Maintained by	Comments
Lake Altus-Lugert	Altus	North Fork of the Red River	6,260	1,547	Bureau of Reclamation	information and photos
American Horse Lake	Geary		100		Oklahoma Wildlife Department	information
Lake of the Arbuckles	Sulphur	Rock Creek	3,127	881.5	National Park Service	information
Arcadia Lake	Arcadia, Edmond	Deep Fork	1,820	974	Army Corps of Engineers	information
Atoka Lake	Atoka	North Boggy Creek	5,700	617	Oklahoma City	information
Bell Cow Lake	Chandler, Oklahoma	Bell Cow Creek	1,153	892	City of Chandler	
Birch Lake	Barnsdall	Birch Creek	1,137	695	Army Corps of Engineers	
Bixhoma Lake	Bixby		110	899	City of Bixby	
Carl Blackwell Lake	Stillwater	Stillwater Creek	3,350	977	Oklahoma State University	
Bluestem Lake	Pawhuska	Middle Bird Creek	720	876		
Boomer Lake	Stillwater	Stillwater Creek	251	896		
Broken Bow Lake	Broken Bow	Mountain Fork River	14,200	627	Army Corps of Engineers	information
Lake Burtschi	Chickasha		180		Oklahoma Wildlife Department	
Canton Lake	Canton	North Canadian River	7,910	974	Army Corps of Engineers	information and photos
Cedar Lake	Heavener	Big Cedar Creek	86	900	U.S. Fish and Wildlife Service	information and photos;
Evan Chambers Lake			80		Oklahoma Wildlife Department	
Chickasha Lake	Caddo County, Oklahoma	Spring Creek	2086.8	1192	City of Chickasha	
Chouteau Reservoir	Chouteau	Arkansas River	2270	511.5	Corps of Engineers MKARNS L&D 17	
Clayton Lake	Clayton	Peal Creek	66	665		information and photos
Claremore Lake	Claremore	Dog Creek	470	610	City of Claremore	
Clear Creek Lake	Duncan	Clear Creek	600	1148		
Ozzie Cobb Lake	Rattan	Rock Creek	116	513	Oklahoma Wildlife Department	
Copan Lake	Copan	Caney River	4,850		Army Corps of Engineers	information
Lake Dahlgren	Noble		30		Oklahoma Wildlife Department	
Dripping Springs Lake	Okmulgee		1150	741	City of Okmulgee	information and photos
Ellsworth Lake	Lawton	East Cache Creek	5,000			information
Elmer Lake	Kingfisher		60	1,119	Oklahoma Wildlife Department	information and photos
Carl G. Etling Lake	Boise City	Carrizo Creek	159		Oklahoma Wildlife Department	
Eucha Lake	Eucha, Oklahoma	Spavinaw Creek	2,800	778	City of Tulsa	
Eufaula Lake	Eufaula	Canadian River	102,000	585	Army Corps of Engineers	information, photos and videos
Fort Cobb Reservoir	Fort Cobb	Cobb Creek	2000	1341		information and photos
Fort Gibson Lake	Fort Gibson	Grand River	19,900	582	Army Corps of Engineers	information, photos and video
Fort Supply Lake	Fort Supply	Wolf Creek	1,800	2,400	Army Corps of Engineers	information
Foss Reservoir	Foss	Washita River	5,956	1,652	Bureau of Reclamation	information and photos
Raymond Gary Lake	Fort Towson	Gates Creek	263	400 feet (120 m) (approx.)	Oklahoma Wildlife Department	
Newt Graham Reservoir	Inola, Tulsa Port of Catoosa	Arkansas River	1490	532	Army Corps of Engineers	
Grand Lake	Grove, Afton, Langley	Grand River	41,749		Grand River Dam Authority	information, photos and videos
Great Salt Plains Lake	Jet, Cherokee	Salt Fork Arkansas River	8,700		Army Corps of Engineers	information, photos and video
Greenleaf Lake	Braggs	Greenleaf Creek	930	699		information and photos
Lake Hall					Oklahoma Wildlife Department	
John Paul Hammerschmidt Lake	Fort Smith, Arkansas, Moffett, Oklahoma	Arkansas River	7,700	392	Army Corps of Engineers	
Hefner Lake	Oklahoma City		2,500			information, photos and video
Heyburn Lake	Kellyville	Polecat Creek	890	784	Army Corps of Engineers	information
Holdenville Lake	Holdenville	Little River	550	787		
W. R. Holway Lake	Salina	Grand River	712	865	Grand River Dam Authority	
Hudson Lake	Locust Grove	Grand River	12,000	649	Grand River Dam Authority	
Hugo Lake	Hugo	Kiamichi River	18,196	404.5 (normal)	Army Corps of Engineers	information and video
Hulah Lake	Copan	Caney River	3,570	733	Army Corps of Engineers	information, photos, and video
Lake Humphreys	Stephens County, Oklahoma	Wildhorse Creek	882		City of Duncan, Oklahoma	
Lake Jap Beaver			65		Oklahoma Wildlife Department	
Lake Jed Johnson	Lawton	Blue Beaver Creek	57.5		U.S. Fish & Wildlife Service	
Kaw Lake	Ponca City	Arkansas River	17,000	1,010	Army Corps of Engineers	information and photos
Robert S. Kerr Reservoir	Sallisaw	Arkansas River	43,800	478	Grand River Dam Authority	information
Keystone Lake	Sand Springs	Arkansas River	23,600		Army Corps of Engineers	information, photos and videos
Konawa Reservoir	Konawa	Canadian River (Jumper Creek)	1,350	924	Oklahoma Gas & Electric Company	
Lone Chimney Lake	Pawnee County	Camp Creek	550			
W. D. Mayo Reservoir	Le Flore County, Sequoyah County	Arkansas River	1595	413	Army Corps of Engineers	
McGee Creek Reservoir	Atoka	McGee Creek	3810	577		
McMurtry Lake	Stillwater	North Stillwater Creek	155	950	City of Stillwater	
Nanih Waiya Lake	Tuskahoma		131	594	Oklahoma Wildlife Department	
Jean Neustadt Lake	Ardmore		462		City of Ardmore	
Oklahoma Lake	Okmulgee	-	-	-	-	
Oologah Lake	Oologah, Nowata, Claremore	Verdigris River	29,500	638	Army Corps of Engineers	information, photos and video
Optima Lake	Hardesty	Beaver River			Army Corps of Engineers	information
Overholser Lake	Oklahoma City, Bethany, and Yukon	North Canadian River	1,581	1,242	City of Oklahoma City and the Oklahoma City Water Utilities Trust	
Pine Creek Lake	Fort Towson	Little River (Red River)	3,750		Army Corps of Engineers	information
Sahoma Lake	Sapulpa	Rock Creek	277	716	City of Sapulpa	2,543 acre feet, 9.15' mean depth, & 35.66' maximum depth. Hydrographic Survey, 2011, OWRB
Sardis Lake	Clayton	Jackfork River	14,360	599	Army Corps of Engineers	information, photos and video
Schooler Lake			35		Oklahoma Wildlife Department	
Skiatook Lake	Skiatook	Hominy Creek	10,190	714	Army Corps of Engineers	information, photos and video
Spavinaw Lake	Spavinaw	Spavinaw Creek	1,636	679		
Tom Steed Reservoir	Snyder	Otter Creek	6,400	1,407		
Stroud Lake	Stroud	Lincoln Creek	621	855		
Tenkiller Lake	Cookson, Vian, Gore, Park Hill, Tahlequah	Illinois River	12,900	632	Army Corps of Engineers	information, photos and videos
Texoma Lake	Kingston	Red River	93,000		Army Corps of Engineers	information, photos and videos
Elmer Thomas Lake	Lawton	Little Medicine Creek	334	1,383		information, photos and video
Thunderbird Lake	Norman	Little River (Canadian River)	5,349	1,039	The Bureau of Reclamation owns the dam, which is operated by the local Central Oklahoma Master Conservancy District.	
Vanderwork Lake	Gotebo				Oklahoma Wildlife Department	
Vincent Lake	Arnett				Oklahoma Wildlife Department	
Watonga Lake	Watonga		55	1375	Oklahoma Wildlife Department	
Waurika Lake	Waurika	Beaver Creek	10,100	951	Army Corps of Engineers	information and photos
Webbers Falls Lake	Webbers Falls	Arkansas River	11,600		Army Corps of Engineers	
Wister Lake	Wister	Poteau River	7,300	478	Army Corps of Engineers	information and photos
Yahola Lake	Tulsa		400		City of Tulsa	

== Lakes and reservoirs (alphabetically) ==
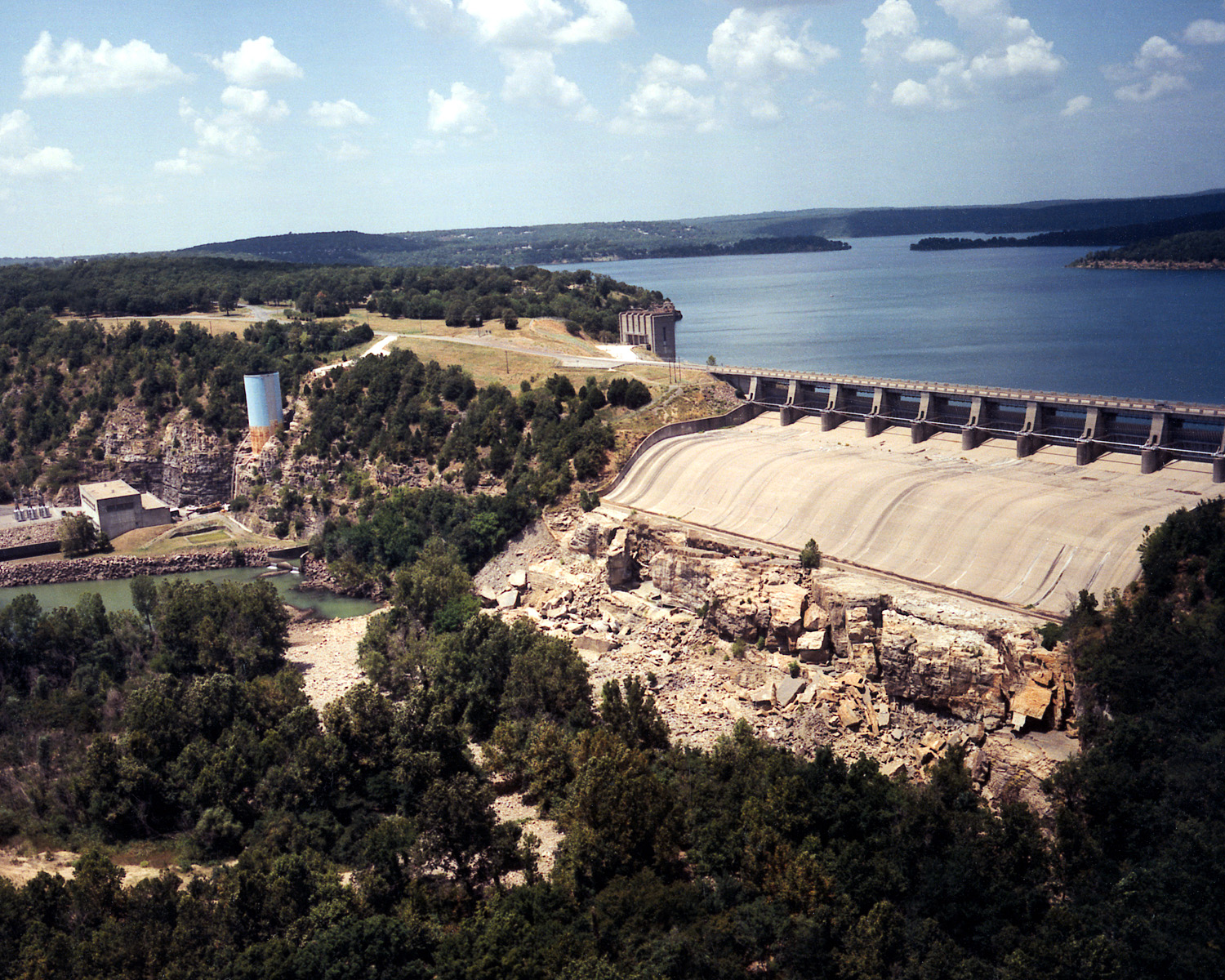
Tenkiller Ferry Lake and dam.

- Altus City Reservoir
- Lake Altus-Lugert
- American Horse Lake
- Lake of the Arbuckles
- Arcadia Lake
- Ardmore City Lake
- Atoka Lake
- Bellcow Lake
- Birch Lake
- Lake Bixhoma
- Bluestem Lake
- Boomer Lake
- Broken Bow Lake
- Brushy Lake (Sallisaw, Oklahoma) (Note: Formerly known as Brushy Creek Reservoir)

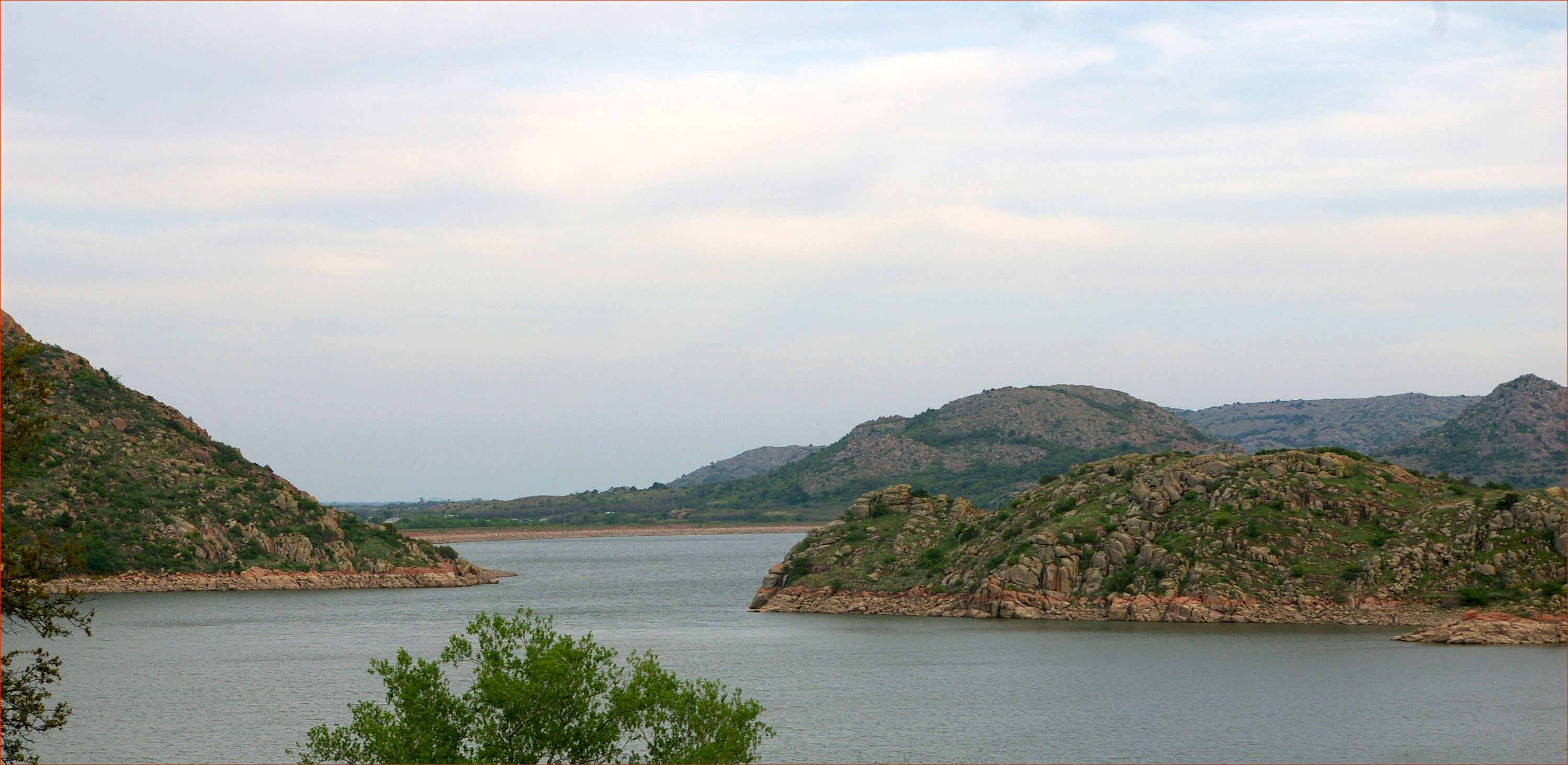
Lake Altus-Lugert is located in the rugged Quartz Mountain region of Oklahoma.

- Lake Burtschi
- Canton Lake
- Carl Albert Lake
- Lake Carl Blackwell
- Lake Carl Etling
- Lake Carlton
- Carter Lake
- Cedar Lake
- Chandler Lake
- Lake Checotah
- Chickasha Lake
- Chouteau Lock & Dam (MKARNS L&D #15)
- Claremore Lake
- Clayton Lake
- Clear Creek Lake
- Cleveland City Lake
- Clinton Lake
- Coalgate City Lake
- Comanche Lake
- Copan Lake
- Cordell Reservoir
- Crowder Lake
- Cushing Municipal Lake
- Lake Dahlgren
- Dead Warrior Lake
- Dripping Springs Lake
- Lake Durant
- Lake Ellsworth
- Lake Elmer
- Lake El Reno
- Lake Eucha
- Evans Chambers Lake
- Foss Reservoir
- Fort Cobb Reservoir
- Fort Supply Lake
- Lake Frederick
- Fuqua Lake
- Newt Graham Reservoir (MKARNS L&D 18)
- Greenleaf Lake
- Grand Lake O' the Cherokees
- Great Salt Plains Lake

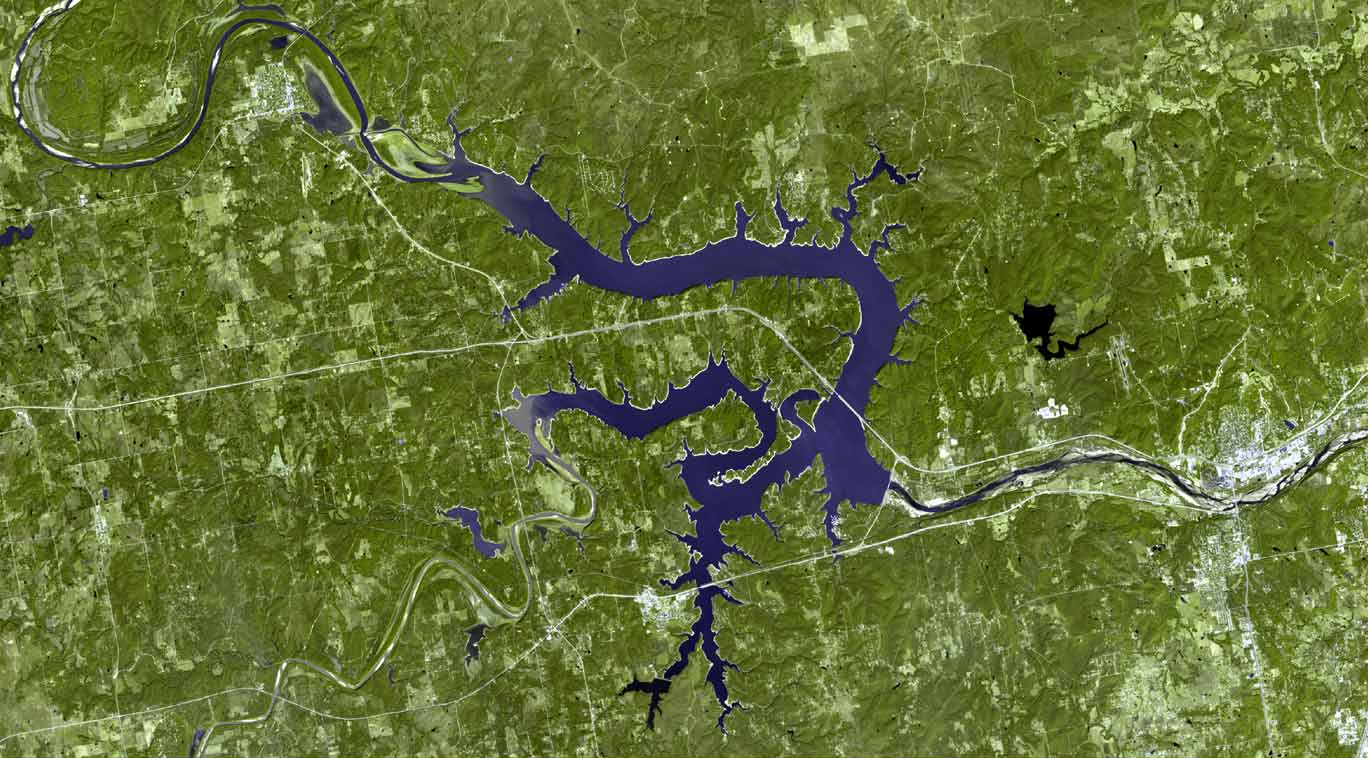
A satellite photo of Keystone Lake illustrates the sinuous nature of most large Oklahoma man-made lakes

- Guthrie Lake
- John Paul Hammerschmidt Lake
- Heyburn Lake
- Hobart Lake (a.k.a. Rocky Lake)
- Holdenville Lake
- Lake Hudson (formerly named Markham Ferry Reservoir)
- Hulah Lake
- Lake Humphreys
- Hugo Lake
- Lake Jean Neustadt
- Lake Jed Johnson
- Keystone Lake
- Konawa Reservoir
- Lake Lawtonka
- Leeper Lake
- Liberty Lake
- Lloyd Church Lake
- Lake Lloyd Vincent
- Lone Chimney Lake
- W. D. Mayo Reservoir (MKARNS L&D #14)
- Lake McAlester|McAlester Lake
- Lake McMurtry
- Mountain Lake
- Lake Murray
- Oklahoma Lake
- Okmulgee Lake
- Okemah Lake

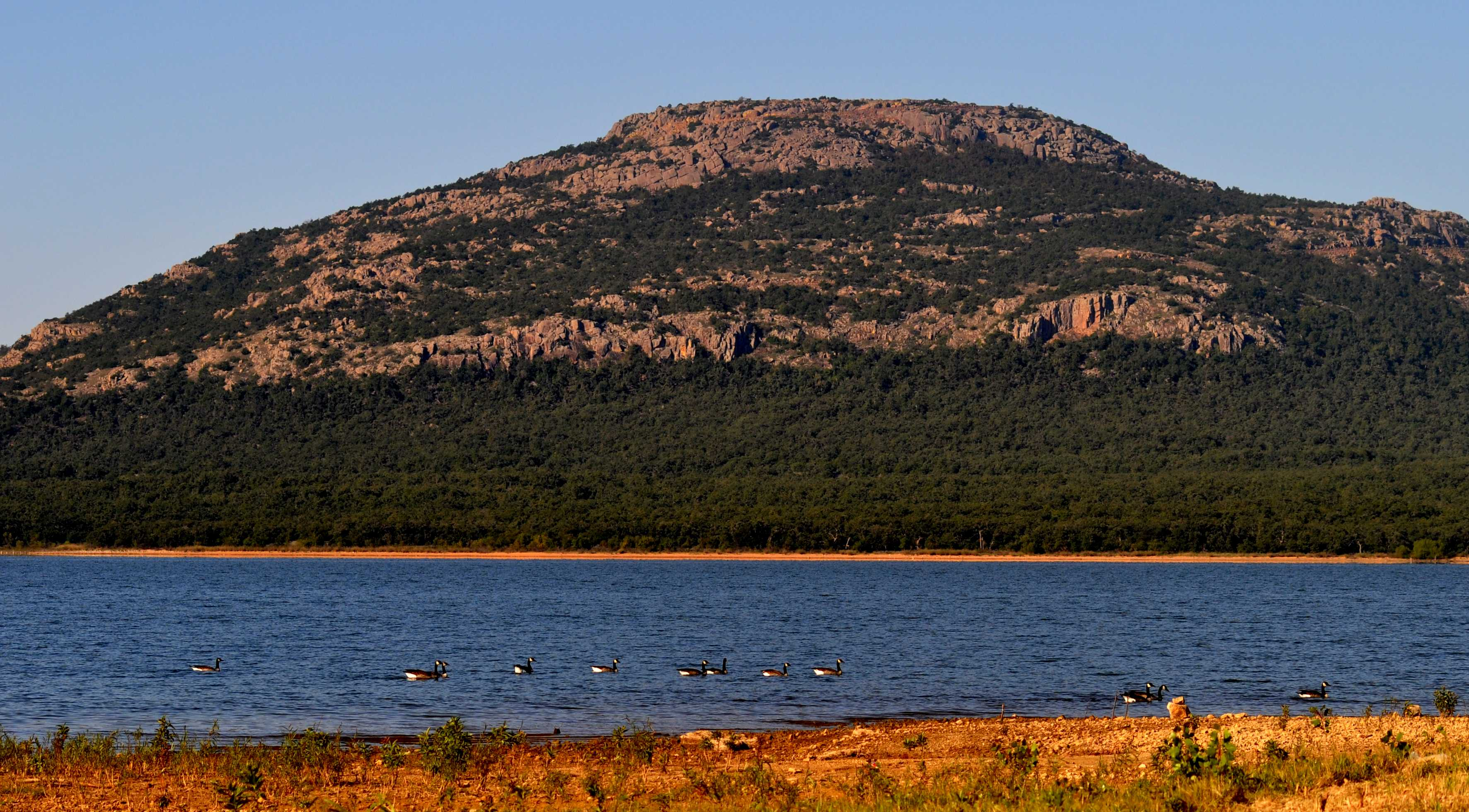
Mt. Scott in the Wichita Mountains looms over Lake Lawtonka.

- Oologah Lake
- Lake Overholser
- Ozzie Cobb Lake
- Pine Creek Lake
- Pauls Valley Lake
- Ponca Lake, Ponca City lake
- Pretty Water Lake
- Lake R.C. Longmire
- Raymond Gary Lake
- Rock Creek Reservoir
- Sahoma Lake
- Sardis Lake
- Shawnee Twin Lakes
- Skiatook Lake
- Skipout Lake
- Sooner Lake
- Lake Spavinaw
- Sportsman Lake
- Spring Creek Lake
- Stroud Lake
- Lake Stanley Draper
- Tom Steed Reservoir
- Lake Talequah
- Elmer Thomas Lake
- Lake Thunderbird
- Watonga Lake
- Waurika Lake
- Wes Watkins
- Lake Wayne Wallace
- Webbers Falls Reservoir (MKARNS L&D #16)
- Wes Watkins Reservoir
- Wewoka Lake
- Lake Wister
- Lake W. R. Holway
- Lake Yahola

== See also ==
- List of rivers of Oklahoma
