= Bickford, Oklahoma =

Ghost town in Oklahoma, US

- Ghost town
- Country: United States
- State: Oklahoma
- County: Blaine
- Time zone: UTC-6 (Central (CST))
  - Summer (DST): UTC-5 (CDT)

Bickford is a ghost town in Blaine County, Oklahoma, United States. Few traces of Bickford remain. The town was located two miles north of Watonga Lake.

== History ==
Bickford was a company-made town, located in the Roman Nose Canyon. The canyons walls were topped with thick layers of gypsum that could make things such as cement, plaster, and drywall. In Bickford, the Roman Nose Gypsum Company built a large mill, commissaries, several homes, a hotel for employees, pipelines for water, and other items for inhabitants. A railroad line extended to the village. A post office was built there in 1904.

== Downfall ==
In the 1920s, the mill was closed due to economic reasons. Immediately, the town was abandoned. By almost a decade later, the mill fell into decay, and everything was in bad shape. The post office closed in 1927.
