= Bird Creek =

Coordinates: 36.214167°N 95.728889°W

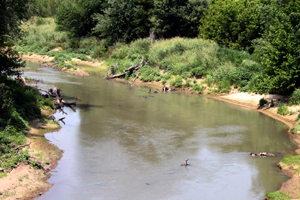
- Chusto-Talasah battlefield on Bird Creek in Tulsa County, Oklahoma.
- Native name: Fus’ Hvcce (Creek)

Physical characteristics
- Mouth: Verdigris River (near Tulsa Port of Catoosa)
- Discharge
  - location: Catoosa
  - average: 1,033 cu ft/s (29.3 m^{3}/s)

Basin features
- River system: Verdigris
- Tributaries
  - left: Birch Creek, Hominy Creek
  - right: Mingo Creek

Bird Creek (Creek: Fus’ Hvcce) is a stream in northeast Oklahoma. The main creek is formed from the waters of North Bird Creek, Middle Bird Creek, and South Bird Creek, all of which rise in Osage County. The South and Middle branches of the creek converge at Bluestem Lake. Outflow from the lake is called Middle Bird Creek. North Bird Creek joins Middle Bird Creek northwest of Pawhuska, and from that point on is simply Bird Creek. From Pawhuska, the creek flows southeastward and eastward through the north side of the Tulsa metropolitan area, before reaching its mouth at the Verdigris River near Catoosa. (Note: Bird Creek is the largest tributary of the Verdigris River.) Major tributaries include Birch Creek, Hominy Creek and Mingo Creek. There are numerous minor tributaries, both named and unnamed, that have contributed to historical flooding problems in the Tulsa area.

Birch Creek is impounded by Birch Lake, south of Barnsdall, Oklahoma. Hominy Creek is impounded by Skiatook Lake dam about 14.3 miles (23.0 km) above its confluence with Bird Creek.

== History ==
Two relatively small battles occurred in Indian Territory along Bird Creek during the Civil War: the Battle of Chusto-Talasah and the Battle of Chustenahlah.

=== Significance in Tulsa's flooding history ===
Historically, Bird Creek was a frequent site of flooding in the Tulsa area. However, flood control did not seem to be considered a serious problem until Tulsa's population growth spilled out into the Bird Creek watershed east and north of downtown Tulsa. The city issued its first land-use plan after a serious flood along the Arkansas River in 1923, but this plan was aimed more at preventing flooding along the Arkansas than in the Bird Creek watershed. Not until three floods in August, September and December 1971, did angry residents demand that the problem be fixed. Tulsa responded by joining the National Flood Insurance Program, adopting a new definition of the 100-year flood standard and promising to regulate flood plain use. In 1974, disastrous floods occurred on Bird Creek in April and May, then on June 8 along Mingo, Joe, Fry and Haikey creeks. Finally, a flood of Mingo creek on September 19 was enough evidence for the residents to show that the city's previous actions had been wholly insufficient.

=== Salt water contamination ===
In August 2016, an oily sheen, along with several dead fish and turtles, was reported on North Bird Creek, about 5 miles (8.0 km) from the Tall Grass Preserve in Osage County, Oklahoma. After looking at the site, the Environmental Protection Agency (EPA), added that warm salt water was bubbling up through the creek water. (Note: Indicators that waste injection water could be the cause were that: (1) water temperatures near the bottom of the creek were near 100 degrees F, and (2) analyses showed that total dissolved solids (TDS) were as high as 80,000 parts per million (ppm).) After trying to locate a cause for the continuing contamination, EPA officials felt that the most likely cause would be water that had been used in secondary recovery of petroleum. Sam Coleman, Regional Administrator for U.S. EPA Region 6, and Kenneth Wagner, scientific advisor to EPA Administrator Scott Pruitt, visited the Coleman Ranch, which surrounded the contamination source, and agreed that responsibility for cleaning up the problem belonged by law to the EPA and the Bureau of Indian Affairs (BIA). (Note: Osage County, Oklahoma is contiguous with the Osage reservation. The Osage tribe had leased the ranch and some nearby oil wells to other people, but retained ownership of the land. BIA is responsible for looking after affairs for the tribe, and EPA is responsible for fixing pollution problems associated with underground operations. The State of Oklahoma had no responsibility for the remediation.)

As of December, 2017, no solution to this issue had been found. The EPA continued monitoring Bird Creek and had threatened to close some of the oil wells nearest the site.
