= Bluestem =

Bluestem may refer to:

- Bluestem Lake, reservoir in Osage County, Oklahoma, United States
- Bluestem, a literary magazine published by Eastern Illinois University

== See also ==
- Bluestem grass (disambiguation)
