= Skiatook Lake =

Reservoir in Oklahoma, United States

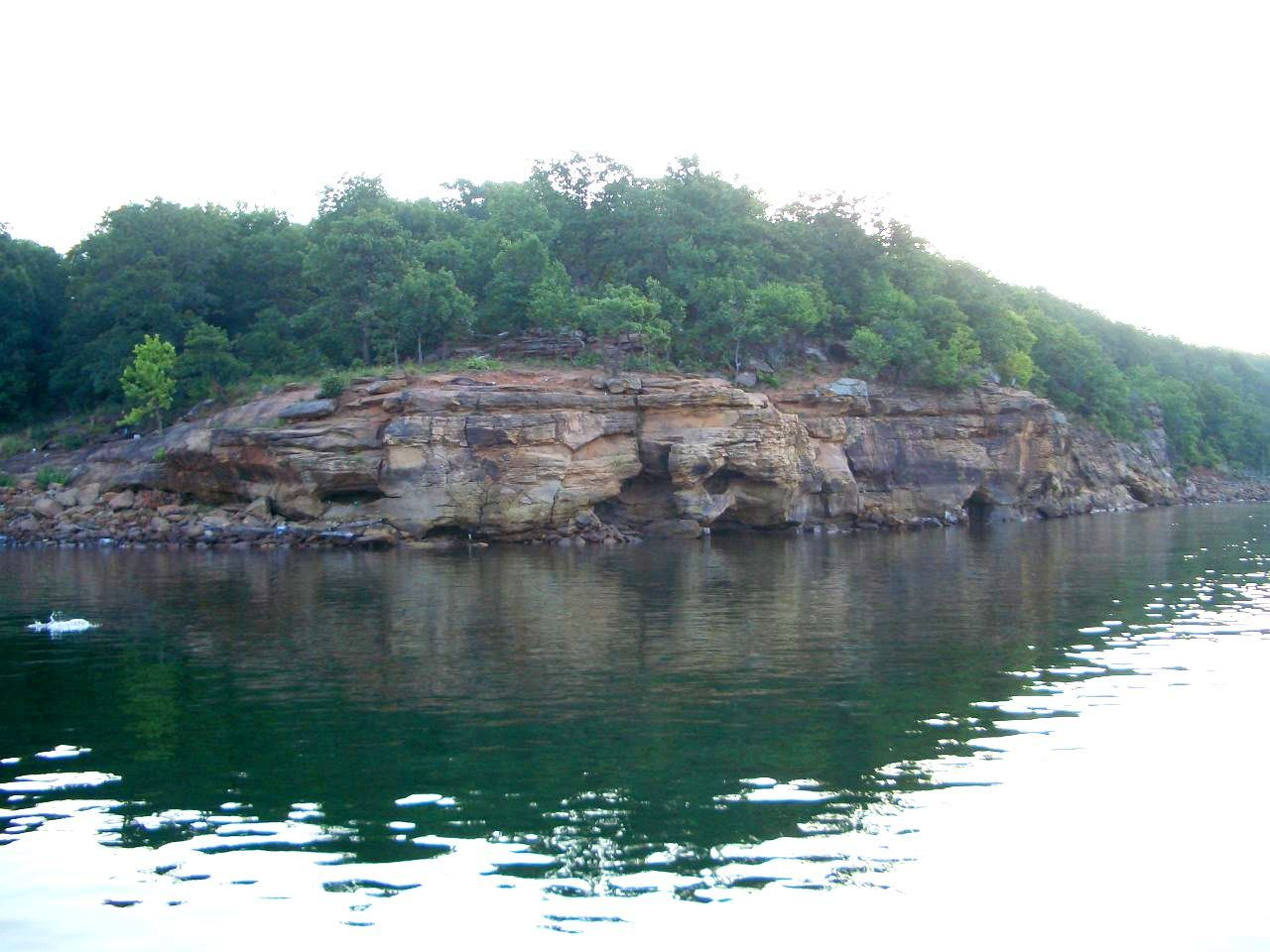

- Location within Oklahoma Location within the United States
- Location: Osage County, Oklahoma
- Coordinates: 36°21′05″N 096°05′31″W
- Primary inflows: Hominy Creek
- Primary outflows: Hominy Creek
- Basin countries: United States
- Surface area: 10,500 acres (4,200 ha)
- Water volume: 322,700 acre-feet (398,000,000 m^{3})
- Surface elevation: 714.0 ft (217.6 m)
- Settlements: Skiatook, Oklahoma

Skiatook Lake is a federally-owned and operated reservoir located in Osage County, Oklahoma, 4 miles (6.4 km) west of the town of Skiatook, 11 miles (18 km) east of Hominy, Oklahoma and about 18 miles (29 km) from Tulsa. The Skiatook Dam is located on Hominy Creek, 14 miles (23 km) upstream of the confluence of Hominy and Bird Creeks. The project purposes include flood control, water quality, water supply, recreation, and fish and wildlife management. The cities of Skiatook, Sand Springs, Sapulpa, and Tulsa use Skiatook Lake as a municipal water supply. Gentle rolling hills of Blackjack and Post Oak interspersed with Tallgrass prairie surround the lake. The lake is under the management of the U.S. Army Corps of Engineers, Tulsa District. (Note: The lake has been called "Lake of the Osage" and "The Gateway to Osage.")

== Size ==
At elevation 714 feet (218 m) above sea level, the lake has a flat surface area of about 10,500 acres (42 km^{2}) and 160 miles (260 km) of shoreline. At normal levels the lake contains 322,700 acre-feet (398,000,000 m^{3}) of water. Skiatook Lake is the fifteenth largest lake in Oklahoma in surface area and the eleventh largest in capacity (acre-feet). (See List of lakes in Oklahoma)

== History ==
Skiatook Dam and Lake were authorized for construction by the Flood Control Act approved October 23, 1962 (87th Congress). It is one of five projects in the Bird Creek Basin plan recommended to meet the comprehensive water resources needs of the area. The total cost of the project was approximately $120 million. Land acquisition started in 1973. Construction began in May 1977 and was completed in 1984.

== Recreation and Camping ==
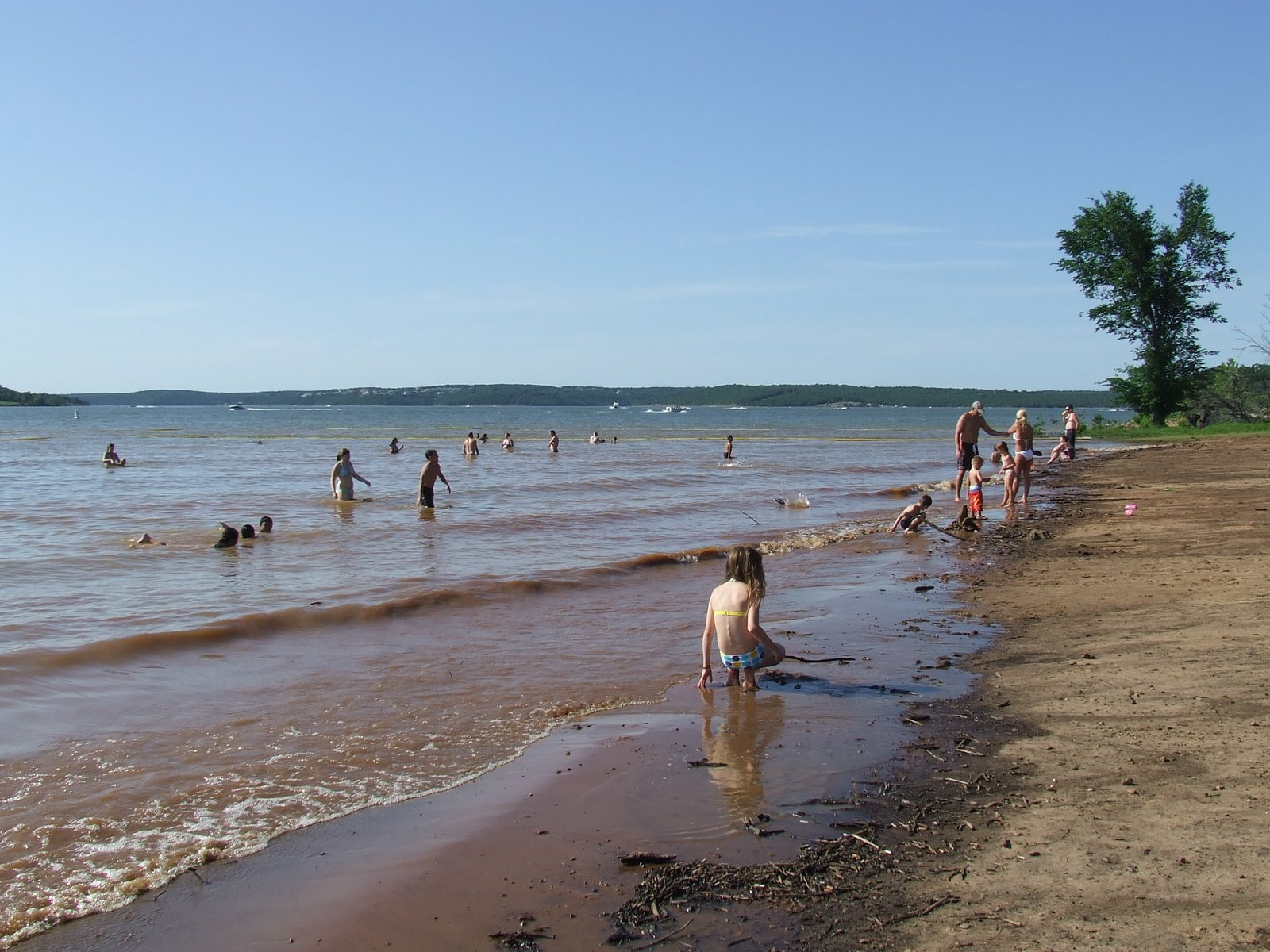
The man-made beach at Tall Chief Cove.

The shoreline is accentuated by steep bluffs. Boating, hiking, swimming, camping, picnicking as well as hunting and fishing are all popular activities at the lake. Marina facilities, including boat slip rentals, fuel sales, and cabin rentals, are provided at Crystal Bay Marina and CrossTimbers Marina."

Sport fishing is very popular and Skiatook Lake has several annual fishing tournaments. Largemouth, smallmouth and striped bass, black and white crappie, channel catfish, and several species of sunfish, or lake perch, are plentiful."

White-tail deer, rabbit, squirrel, opossum, raccoon, quail, dove and many more bird species are plentiful around the lake. Bald eagles are commonly observed. Coyote, red fox, gray fox and bobcat are also present.

About 1,800 acres (7.3 km²) of land around the lake have been set aside for public use areas. These areas provide roads, parking spaces, boat ramps, nature trails, picnicking and camping sites along with sanitary facilities. There are several places open to camping, including Tall Chief Cove, Bull Creek and Twin Points campgrounds. Other parks on the lake include Blackdog Park, Osage Park, Quapaw Park, Hominy Landing and Skiatook Point.

John Zink Boy Scout camp is located along the southern shores of Skiatook Lake.

== Events ==
There are several annual events held on Skiatook Lake, including many fishing tournaments. In July, the annual "Fantasy in the Sky" celebration is held at the airport (was at Tall Chief Cove), attracting around 35,000 people from all over Oklahoma. It features live concerts and fireworks at dusk, set to music. The Skiatook Chamber of Commerce also sponsors many events on the lake.

== Wildlife Management Area ==
The Skiatook Wildlife Management Area (WMA) encompasses about 5,000 acres (20 km^{2}) of land around the upper end of the lake, including about 1,800 acres (7.3 km^{2}) of water. The WMA is administered by the Oklahoma Department of Wildlife Conservation.

== CrossTimbers Resort and the National Federal Demonstration Lakes Program ==
Skiatook Lake was one of 31 federally-managed reservoirs selected to participate in a National Federal Demonstration Lakes program in response a report of the National Recreation Lakes Study Commission created by Congress and appointed by President Clinton in 1998. The district recommended Skiatook Lake for inclusion in the national demonstration program because of its undeveloped recreation potential. Through the program, the district sought to identify sponsors who would be willing to make financial investments to bring new and improved recreation opportunities to the lake. In 2003 the Corps entered into a multi-year no-cost public parks and recreation lease with the Skiatook Economic Development Authority (SEDA) for implementation of a development plan for 700 acres of public land in the Tall Chief Cove and Skiatook Point areas. Through sub-leases, SEDA has developed an area known as CrossTimbers Marina and Resort. As of 2016 amenities included a commercial marina with 450 slips, boat sales, rental and repair services, rental cabins, a restaurant, The Springs Event Center and an improved overlook area. The lease also includes plans for development of a golf course and additional public camping and RV facilities at Skiatook Point.
