= Lake Ellsworth (Oklahoma) =

Lake in Oklahoma, built for water supply

- Location within Oklahoma Location within the United States
- Location: Comanche / Caddo counties, Oklahoma
- Coordinates: 34°49′21″N 98°21′13″W
- Type: reservoir
- Primary inflows: East Cache Creek
- Primary outflows: East Cache Creek
- Catchment area: 251 sq mi (650 km^{2})
- Basin countries: United States
- Managing agency: City of Lawton
- Built: 1962
- Surface area: 5,600 acres (23 km^{2})
- Average depth: 15.8 ft (4.8 m)
- Max. depth: 54.2 ft (16.5 m)
- Water volume: 59,470 acre⋅ft (73,360,000 m^{3})
- Shore length^{1}: 53.5 mi (86.1 km)
- Surface elevation: 1,207 ft (368 m)
- Settlements: Apache, Elgin, Fletcher, Lawton
- ^{1} Shore length is not a well-defined measure.

Lake Ellsworth is a lake in Caddo and Comanche counties in the state of Oklahoma in the United States. It was built by the City of Lawton, Oklahoma in 1962, primarily to serve as a water supply source for Lawton and the surrounding area. The nearest community is Elgin, Oklahoma.

== Description ==
Lake Ellsworth has a stream source from East Cache Creek, 53 miles (85 km) of shoreline, and encompasses 5,600 acres (23 km^{2}). The normal capacity is 59,470 acre-feet (73,360,000 m^{3})

== Recreation ==
Recreational activities allowed include fishing, wakeboarding, water skiing and jet skiing. Swimming is allowed in most of the lake, except near the dam, boat ramps and the boathouse. However, swimming is at the visitor's own risk, since there are no lifeguards. Fishing and camping facilities are maintained by the City of Lawton, Oklahoma.

Several species of fish live in the lake, including channel catfish, crappie, flathead catfish, largemouth bass, saugeye, sunfish, walleye and white bass. In 1999, a fisherman caught an 85-pound, 4-ounce Blue Catfish, which was the state record for that species at the time.

== See also ==
- Cache Creek
- List of lakes in Oklahoma
- Wichita Mountains
- Wichita Mountains Wildlife Refuge
