= Lake Dahlgren =

Man-made lake in Oklahoma, United States

- Location within Oklahoma
- Location: Cleveland County, Oklahoma, United States
- Coordinates: 35°03′31″N 97°12′00″W
- Basin countries: United States
- Surface area: 30 acres (12 ha)
- Surface elevation: 1,102 ft (336 m)
- Settlements: Noble, Oklahoma

Lake Dahlgren is a 30-acre (12 ha) lake situated approximately 9 miles (14 km) southeast of Noble, Oklahoma. It is an artificial lake created by the Oklahoma Department of Wildlife Conservation in 1953. There are no picnic, camping or bathroom facilities at Lake Dahlgren. However, the lake remains popular due to the numerous hiking trails located nearby.

== Notes ==
Cleveland
