= Nanih Waiya Lake =

- Location within Oklahoma
- Location: Pushmataha County, Oklahoma
- Coordinates: 34°38′04″N 95°18′02″W
- Type: artificial lake
- Surface area: 131 acres (0.53 km^{2})
- Water volume: 1,064 acre-feet (1,312,000 m^{3})
- Shore length^{1}: 3 miles (4.8 km)
- Surface elevation: 594 foot (181 m)
- ^{1} Shore length is not a well-defined measure.

Nanih Waiya Lake is a small recreational lake in Pushmataha County, Oklahoma. (Note: According to Bright, the Choctaw name literally translates into English as "hill leaning".) It is in the Ouachita Mountains, 1.5 miles (2.4 km) northeast of Tuskahoma, Oklahoma, and 16.3 miles (26.2 km) from Talihina, Oklahoma.

The lake, which was built in 1958, impounds the waters of several small creeks which are Kiamichi River tributaries. It was named for Nanih Waiya, the first capital of the Choctaw Nation after its removal during the Trail of Tears to Oklahoma, which is nearby. It is managed by the Oklahoma Department of Wildlife Conservation.

Nanih Waiya Lake comprises 131 acres (0.53 km^{2}) of area and 3 miles (4.8 km) of shoreline. Normal pool elevation is 594 foot (181 m) above sea level. Its normal holding capacity is 1,064 acre-feet (1,312,000 m^{3}).

The lake is popular for boating and fishing. There are two boat ramps, one on the southeast shore and one on the southwest shore. The area around the lake has sites for pitching tents. Hiking trails near the lake are: Clayton Trail, Cripple Mountain Trail, Five N Trail, Hurd Trail and Walters Mule Trail.

The Choctaw Nation and the State of Oklahoma signed an agreement that allows the Choctaw Nation to buy at least 50,000 hunting and fishing licenses at $2.00 each for its resident citizens. The Choctaw Nation will also pay $200,000 and an administrative fee of $75,000 per year to the Oklahoma Department of Wildlife Conservation, which owns the lake. The Choctaw Nation will also take over maintenance of Lake Nanih Waiya. The agreement went into effect January 1, 2017 and ends December 31, 2019.
