= Lake Elmer (Oklahoma) =

- Location within Oklahoma Location within the United States
- Location: Kingfisher County, Oklahoma
- Coordinates: 35°52′52″N 97°59′25″W
- Type: Reservoir
- Basin countries: United States
- Managing agency: Oklahoma Wildlife Department
- Built: 1962
- Max. length: 2,820 ft (860 m)
- Max. width: 2,110 ft (640 m)
- Surface area: 60 acres (24 ha)
- Average depth: 6.4 ft (2.0 m)
- Max. depth: 18 ft (5.5 m)
- Water volume: 1,080 acre⋅ft (1.33 hm^{3})
- Shore length^{1}: 3.4 mi (5.5 km)
- Surface elevation: 1,184 ft (361 m)
- Islands: 1 islet
- Settlements: Kingfisher, Oklahoma
- ^{1} Shore length is not a well-defined measure.

Lake Elmer is a reservoir in Kingfisher County, Oklahoma that is owned by the Oklahoma Department of Wildlife Conservation. The nearest town is Kingfisher, about 4 miles (6.4 km) southeast of the lake. Constructed in 1962, it was completely drained in 1978 for deepening the shoreline and constructing fishing jetties. It was reimpounded and restocked with fish, after a fish kill in 1979. It has a surface area of 60 acres (24 ha) and a shoreline of 3.4 miles (5.5 km). Its elevation is 1,119 feet (341 m). The latitude and longitude are 35.8798, -97.9878. It has an average depth of 6 feet (1.8 m) and a maximum depth of 18 feet (5.5 m).

The lake has a boat ramp and two water wells. Fish species of interest to fishermen are Largemouth Bass, Bluegill Sunfish, Crappie and Catfish.
