= Wes Watkins Reservoir =

Reservoir in Oklahoma

- Location within Oklahoma Location within the United States
- Location: Pottawatomie County, Oklahoma, US
- Coordinates: 35°24′15″N 97°7′10″W
- Lake type: reservoir
- Primary inflows: North Deer Creek
- Primary outflows: North Deer Creek
- Catchment area: 38.5 sq mi (100 km^{2})
- Basin countries: United States
- Surface area: 1,142 acres (4.62 km^{2})
- Water volume: 13,993 acre⋅ft (17,260,000 m^{3})
- Settlements: McLoud, Oklahoma

Wes Watkins Reservoir is a reservoir located in Pottawatomie County in central Oklahoma, United States, between Oklahoma City and Shawnee (in the center of McLoud). Its primary use is recreation, especially camping and fishing.

Wes Watkins Reservoir was opened to the public in August 1999 and is considered a relatively young reservoir. The 1,142-acre (5 km^{2}) lake is operated by the City of McLoud as of July 1, 2010. It was formerly managed by Pottawatomie County Development Authority.

The reservoir was named in honor of former Oklahoma Congressman Wes Watkins. It was initially known as North Deer Creek Lake.

The Shawnee city commissioners approved the transfer of Wes Watkins Reservoir recreational operations and management to the city of McLoud, beginning July 1, 2010.

Its drainage area is 38.5 square miles (100 km^{2}). According to a report by Camp, Dresser & McKee (CDM), the normal capacity of the reservoir is 13,993 acre-feet (17,260,000 m^{3}).

== See also ==
- List of lakes in Oklahoma
