= John Paul Hammerschmidt Lake =

- Location within Arkansas Location within the United States
- Coordinates: 35°21′09″N 94°17′44″W
- Etymology: navigational reservoir
- Part of: McClellan-Kerr Arkansas River Navigation System (MKARNS)
- River sources: Arkansas River, Poteau River
- Basin countries: United States
- Managing agency: U.S. Army Corps of Engineers
- Max. length: 26 miles (42 km)
- Surface area: 7,700 acres (31 km^{2})
- Shore length^{1}: 120 miles (190 km)
- Surface elevation: 392 feet (119 m)
- Settlements: Fort Smith, Arkansas, Van Buren, Arkansas, Barling, Arkansas, Moffett, Oklahoma, Fort Coffee, Oklahoma
- ^{1} Shore length is not a well-defined measure.

John Paul Hammerschmidt Lake is a reservoir on the Arkansas River and an integral part of the McClellan–Kerr Arkansas River Navigation System (MKARNS). It was formed by constructing the James W. Trimble Lock & Dam 13 across the river, near the city of Barling, Arkansas and extends upriver 26 miles (42 km) to W. D. Mayo Lock and Dam, which is located inside the state of Oklahoma. Although the Trimble facility was completed in 1969, it was not allowed to pass commercial barges until 1971, when upstream facilities were completed.

The lake also serves as the boundary between Crawford and Sebastian Counties, Arkansas, as well as dividing Van Buren, the county seat of Crawford County, and Fort Smith, the county seat of Sebastian County. The Arkansas-Oklahoma State Line is the western boundary of both Arkansas counties. Approximately one half of the lake's length lies within Oklahoma, where the lake separates Sequoyah County, Oklahoma from LeFlore County, Oklahoma.

Poteau River, an Arkansas River tributary which flows north in Oklahoma, crosses the Arkansas-Oklahoma state line immediately southwest of Fort Smith and discharges into Hammersmith Lake.

The normal elevation of the lake is 392 feet (119 m) above sea level.
