= Ozzie Cobb Lake =

- Location within Oklahoma
- Location: Pushmataha County, Oklahoma
- Coordinates: 34°14′30″N 95°23′01″W
- Type: lake
- Surface area: 116 acres (0.47 km^{2})
- Average depth: 7.2 feet (2.2 m)
- Max. depth: 22 feet (6.7 m)
- Water volume: 833 acre-feet (1,027,000 m^{3})
- Shore length^{1}: 4 miles (6.4 km)
- Surface elevation: 513 feet (156 m)
- ^{1} Shore length is not a well-defined measure.

Ozzie Cobb Lake is a small recreational lake in Pushmataha County, Oklahoma. It is located 6 miles (9.7 km) northeast of Rattan, Oklahoma.

The lake, which was built in 1958, impounds the waters of Rock Creek. It is named for J. Ozzie Cobb (1898-1965), an area resident. It is managed by the Oklahoma Department of Wildlife Conservation.

Ozzie Cobb Lake comprises 116 acres (0.47 km^{2}) of area and 4 miles (6.4 km) of shoreline. Normal pool elevation is 513 feet (156 m) above sea level. Its normal holding capacity is 833 acre-feet (1,027,000 m^{3}). The maximum depth is 22 feet (6.7 m). The average depth is 7.2 feet (2.2 m).
