= Lake El Reno =

- Location within Oklahoma
- Location: Canadian County, Oklahoma
- Coordinates: 35°31′20″N 97°59′30″W
- Type: Reservoir
- Primary inflows: Fourmile Creek (Canadian County, Oklahoma)
- Primary outflows: Fourmile Creek (Canadian County, Oklahoma)
- Basin countries: United States
- Built: 1966
- Surface area: 170 acres (69 ha)
- Max. depth: 12 ft (3.7 m)
- Water volume: 709 acre⋅ft (0.875 hm^{3})
- Shore length^{1}: 4 mi (6.4 km)
- Surface elevation: 1,368 ft (417 m)
- Settlements: El Reno, Oklahoma
- ^{1} Shore length is not a well-defined measure.

Lake El Reno was created in 1966 in Canadian County, Oklahoma, near the city of El Reno, by constructing an earthen dam across Fourmile Creek, (Canadian County, Oklahoma), a tributary of the North Canadian River. (Note: Fourmile Creek is a stream in Canadian County that is 6.36 kilometres (3.95 mi) long.) The lake has a normal capacity of 709 acre-feet (875,000 m^{3}), covers a surface area of 170 acres (690,000 m^{2}) and is surrounded by 4 miles (6.4 km) of shoreline. Its maximum depth is 19 feet (5.8 m). The lake is operated by the city of El Reno.

No city fishing permit is needed, but a state permit is required (as is true for fishing anywhere in the state).

== See also ==
- Lakes of Oklahoma
