= Chouteau Lock & Dam =

Lock and dam in Oklahoma, United States

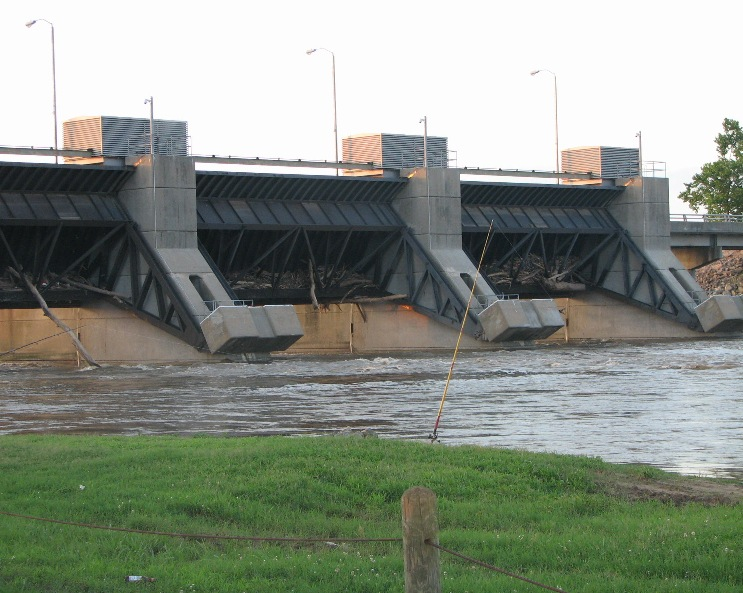
- Interactive map of Chouteau Lock & Dam
- Official name: Chouteau Lock & Dam #17
- Country: United States
- Location: Oklahoma
- Coordinates: 35°51′30″N 95°22′19″W
- Purpose: Navigation
- Status: Operational
- Construction began: 1967
- Opening date: 1971
- Construction cost: $ 31.8 million
- Operator: U. S. Army Corps of Engineers

Dam and spillways
- Impounds: Verdigris River
- Length: 53 ft (16 m)

Reservoir
- Creates: Chouteau Reservoir
- Total capacity: 23,340 acre-feet (28,790,000 m^{3})
- Catchment area: 240 square miles (620 km^{2})
- Surface area: 2,270 acres (9.2 km^{2})
- Maximum length: 18.7 miles (30.1 km)

Chouteau Lock & Dam, also identified as Chouteau Lock & Dam 17, is 17th lock and dam of the McClellan-Kerr Arkansas River Navigation System (MKARNS) from the Mississippi River to its terminus at the Tulsa Port of Catoosa, and is the first lock and dam on the Verdigris River in Oklahoma, just above the Three Forks junction with the Arkansas River. The lock is about 4 miles (6.4 km) northwest of Okay in Wagoner County, Oklahoma. Construction of this facility started in 1966 and was completed in 1970. The estimated cost of Chouteau Lock & Dam was $ 31.8 million.

The lock and dam was named for the family of Auguste Pierre Chouteau (1786-1838), who was a pioneer European that settled in this area during the late 18th and early 19th Century. (Note: Auguste built his home near the location of present-day Salina, Oklahoma in 1796 and established a trading house at Three Forks in 1823. He had at least four wives and fathered at least seven children.)

== Reservoir description ==
Chouteau Reservoir extends for 18.7 miles (30.1 km) to the next system on the Verdigris River, Newt Graham Lock & Dam. Its surface covers 2,270 acres (9.2 km^{2}). Normal capacity of the reservoir is 23,340 acre-feet (28,790,000 m^{3}). Its drainage area is 240 square miles (620 km^{2}) The lock chamber, like all chambers on the MKARNS, is 110 feet (34 m) wide by 600 feet (180 m) long. The lift is 21 feet (6.4 m)

== Dam description ==
The Chouteau Dam is gravity type, of earthen construction. Built on a rock foundation, its height is 53 feet (16 m), and length is 11,690 feet (3,560 m). The maximum discharge rate is 155,000 cubic feet per second (4,400 m^{3}/s).

== Recreation ==
=== Fishing and hunting ===
The MKARNS is often referred to as "the Ditch" by fishermen, who find the waterway an excellent source of fish, especially largemouth and white bass. Other species normally present are: crappie, channel catfish, flatheads and sunfish. Persons fishing from boats are cautioned to watch for submerged tree stumps and logs.

Hunting is allowed in the Wildlife Management Area. Principal game species include: white tailed deer, dove, quail squirrel, rabbit, turkey and several species of migratory water fowl..

=== Camping and picnicking ===
The Corps manages three areas that abut the Chouteau pool: Afton Landing, Tullahassee Loop and Coal Creek. Camping is allowed in Afton and Tullahassee. Camping in undesignated areas is prohibited. Camping and day use fees are collected by self deposit at Afton Landing. Tullahassee and Coal Creek facilities are free. Coal Creek is limited to boat launching and day use. Afton Landing also has a group picnic shelter..

=== Trails ===
The Jean Pierre Chouteau Trail is no longer maintained.

== Major repair of Lock 17 ==
The "pintle ball", a vital piece of equipment for the Chouteau Lock, was found to be damaged and in need of total replacement during a routine dewatering of the lock in 2009. This required obtaining an identical replacement, dewatering the lock again, lifting the gate, removing the old ball and installing its replacement, then refilling the lock Such an operation had never been attempted by the Tulsa District of the U.S. Army Corps of Engineers (ACE). Complicating the operation was that there were no plans or drawings to show how the work should be done, and there were no spare pintal ball parts available. The replacement would have to be designed and constructed anew. Since installing the device would require closing the lock to traffic for a minimum of three weeks, scheduling was critical to minimize costs. The ACE planned to close the lock and start the dewatering on August 27, 2012. Reopening the lock to normal traffic was scheduled for September 6, 2012.
