= Lake McMurtry =

Lake McMurty
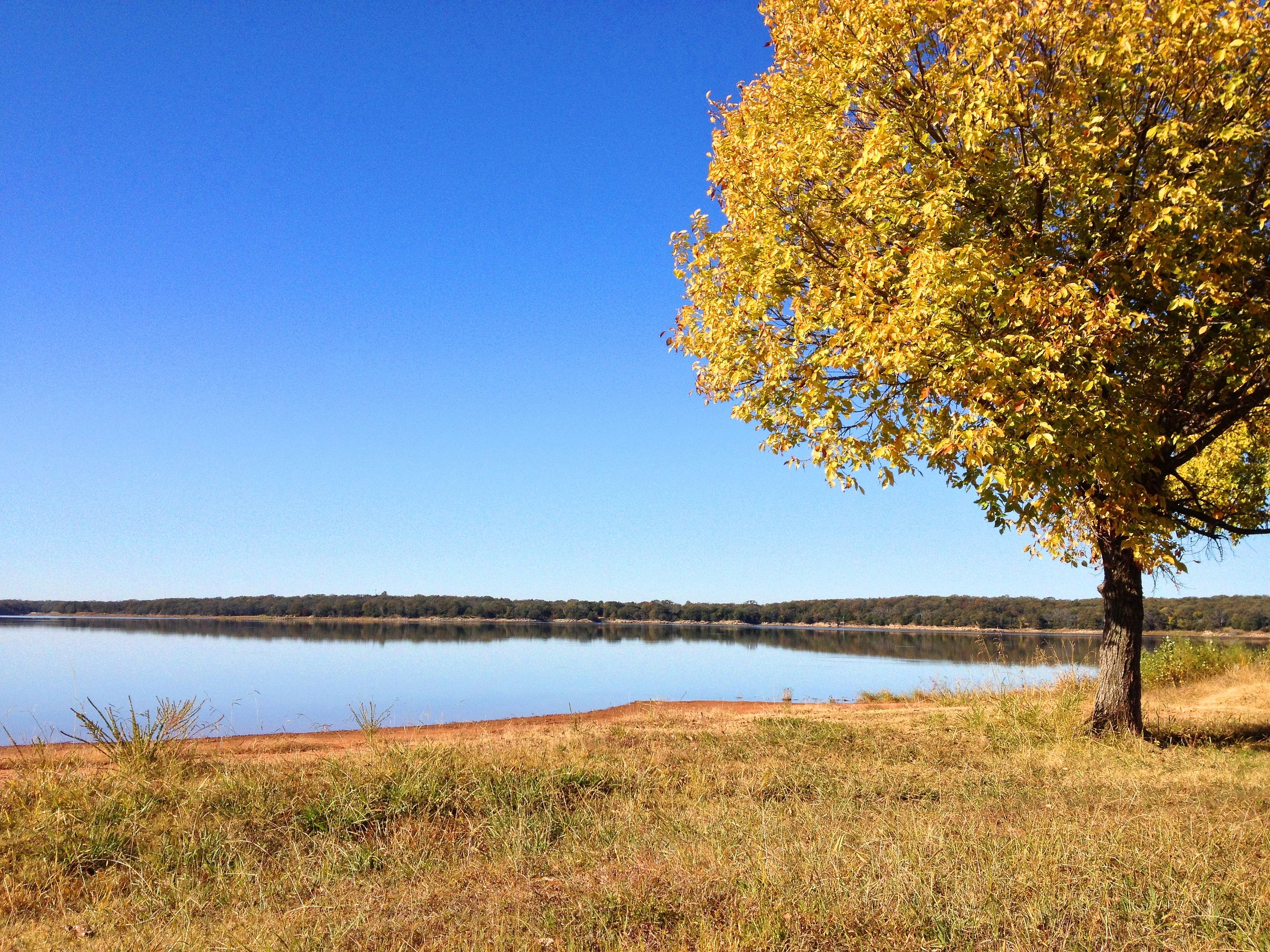

- Location within Oklahoma
- Country: United States
- Location: Noble County, Oklahoma
- Coordinates: 36.175911°N 97.179592°W
- Status: complete
- Owner: City of Stillwater

Reservoir
- Maximum water depth: 17 feet (5.2 m)

Lake McMurty is a reservoir in Noble County, Oklahoma. The lake is located to the north-west of Stillwater, and north of Lake Carl Blackwell.

== History ==
Lake McMurtry in Oklahoma is named after Frank McMurtry, who served as a former Payne County Commissioner. He played a significant role in the creation of the lake. Naming the reservoir after McMurtry was a way to honor his contributions to the project and the region.

== Recreation ==
The lake is a popular fishing, boating and camping location.
