= Clear Creek Lake =

Reservoir in Stephens County, Oklahoma, US

- Location within Oklahoma Location within the United States
- Location: Stephens County, Oklahoma
- Coordinates: 34°35′53″N 97°50′46″W
- Type: Reservoir
- Primary inflows: Clear Creek
- Primary outflows: Clear Creek
- Basin countries: United States
- Built: 1948
- Surface area: 600 acres (2.4 km^{2})
- Water volume: 7,710 acre-feet (0.00951 km^{3})
- Shore length^{1}: 11 miles (18 km)
- Surface elevation: 1,148 feet (350 m)
- Settlements: Duncan, Oklahoma; Marlow, Oklahoma
- ^{1} Shore length is not a well-defined measure.

Clear Creek Lake is a reservoir located in Stephens County, Oklahoma, approximately 13 miles (21 km) northeast of Duncan, Oklahoma. It was built in 1948 with an earthen dam. It is one of four lakes (Note: The other three lakes are: Comanche Lake, Duncan Lake and Humphreys Lake) that are collectively known as the "Duncan Area Lakes."

== Physical description ==
The normal capacity of Clear Creek Lake is 7,710 acre-feet (9,510,000 m^{3}) of water. It covers 600 acres (2,400,000 m^{2}) and is surrounded by 11 miles (18 km) of shoreline. The elevation is 1,148 feet (350 m).

== Notes ==
comanche lake isn't part of the 4 lakes. Its Duncan lake, Humphrey, clear creek and fuqua
