= Fuqua Lake =

Reservoir in Stephens County, Oklahoma constructed in 1962

- Location within Oklahoma Location within the United States
- Location: Stephens County, Oklahoma
- Coordinates: 34.607°N 97.682°W
- Type: reservoir
- Managing agency: City of Duncan, Oklahoma
- Designation: Reservoir
- First flooded: 1962
- Surface area: 1,500 acres (610 ha)
- Average depth: 14 feet (4.3 m)
- Water volume: 21,600 acre-feet (26,600,000 m^{3})
- Shore length^{1}: 19 miles (31 km)
- Surface elevation: 1,079 feet (329 m)
- Settlements: Duncan, Oklahoma
- ^{1} Shore length is not a well-defined measure.

Fuqua Lake is a reservoir located in Stephens County, Oklahoma, about 21 miles (34 km) northeast of the city of Duncan on State Highway 29. Constructed in 1962, it is the largest of four reservoirs that comprise the public water supply for Duncan. (Note: The other three reservoirs are Lake Humphreys, Lake Duncan, and Clear Creek Lake.)

The lake was reportedly named for Herbert Breedlove (Babe) Fuqua, an oil businessesperson and politician from Fort Worth, Texas.

It is impounded by an earthen dam that was constructed in 1962.

== Lake description ==
The lake has a normal capacity of 21,600 acre-feet (26,600,000 m^{3}) of water. The lake covers 1,500 acres (610 ha), surrounded by 19 miles (31 km) of shoreline and having an average depth of 14 feet (4.3 m). It is operated by the city of Duncan. It is also used for fishing.
