= Elmer Thomas Lake =

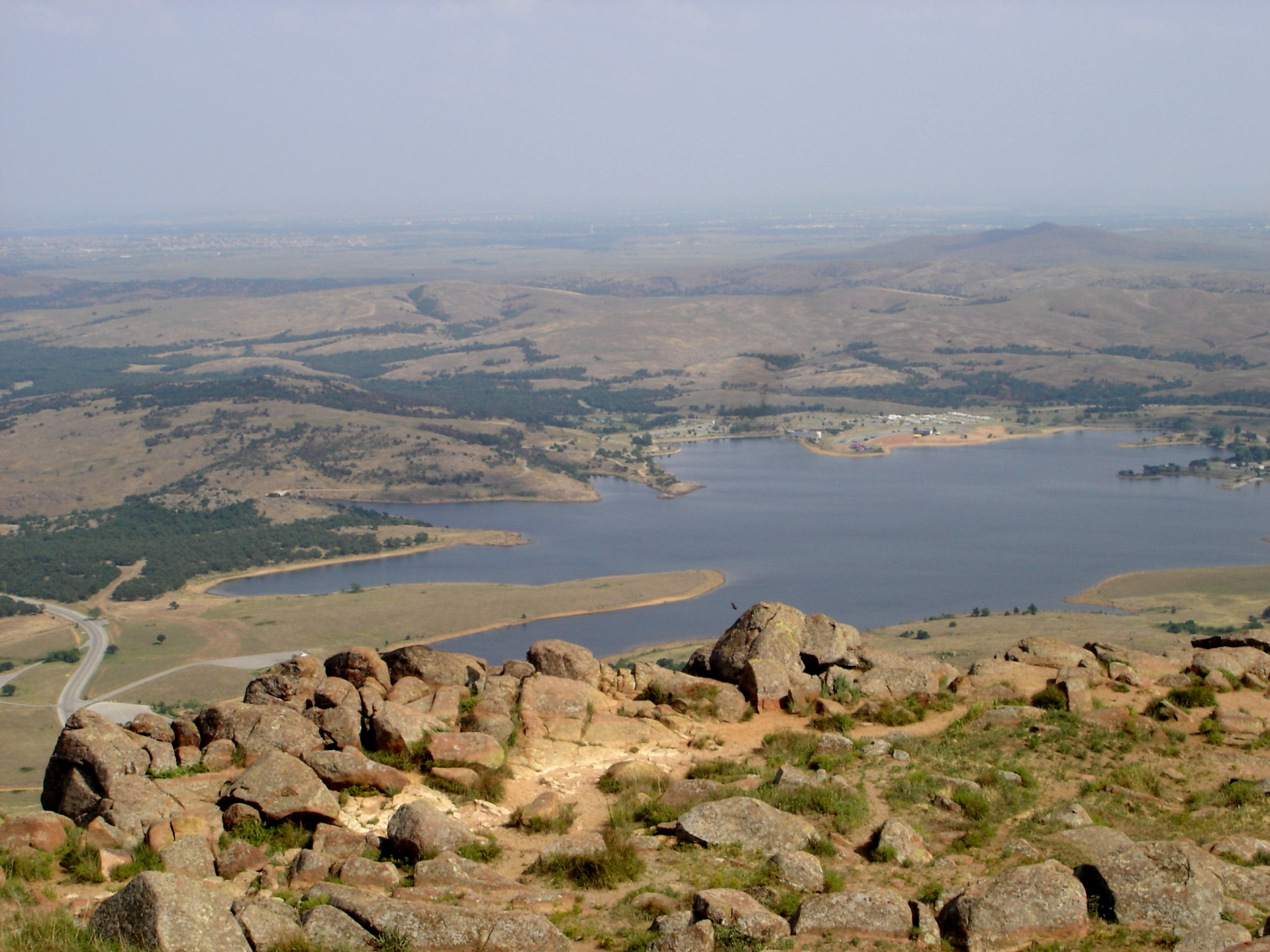
- Lake Elmer Thomas from observation deck of Mountain Scott

- Location within Oklahoma Location within the United States
- Location: Comanche County, Oklahoma
- Coordinates: 34°43′29″N 98°31′14″W
- Type: reservoir
- Primary inflows: Little Medicine Creek
- Primary outflows: Little Medicine Creek
- Catchment area: 4,377 acres (1,771 ha)
- Basin countries: United States
- Surface area: 334 acres (135 ha)
- Average depth: 35.92 ft (10.95 m)
- Water volume: 12,000 acre⋅ft (0.015 km^{3})
- Surface elevation: 1,383 ft (422 m)
- Settlements: Fort Sill, Lawton, Medicine Park, Meers

Elmer Thomas Lake is a lake in Comanche County in the state of Oklahoma in the United States. It is located on the boundary between the Wichita Mountain Wildlife Refuge and Fort Sill military base. The lake is named for an Oklahoma lawyer and politician, Elmer Thomas, who lived in Lawton and represented Oklahoma's 6th Congressional District in the U. S. House of Representatives from 1922 until 1926, then was elected as U.S. Senator, where he served until 1950.

The lake has a stream source from Little Medicine Creek, encompasses 334 acres (135 ha), and primarily serves as a recreation area.

== Recreation ==
Lake Elmer Thomas Recreation Area (LETRA) which is on the Fort Sill military base, provides camping areas, cabins, a swim beach, water slides, picnic areas, boating ramps and boat rentals. On the refuge side of the lake, there are two fishing piers and a boating ramp.

== See also ==
- Cache Creek
- Wichita Mountains
- Wichita Mountains Wildlife Refuge
