= Lake Humphreys =

- Location within Oklahoma Location within the United States
- Location: Stephens County, Oklahoma
- Coordinates: 34°35′31″N 97°53′38″W
- Type: reservoir
- Primary inflows: Wildhorse Creek
- Primary outflows: Wildhorse Creek
- Basin countries: United States
- Built: 1957
- Average depth: 40 feet (12 m)
- Water volume: 14,041 acre-foot (17,319,000 m^{3})
- Shore length^{1}: 16.1 miles (25.9 km)
- Surface elevation: 1,178 ft (359 m)
- Settlements: Duncan, Oklahoma
- ^{1} Shore length is not a well-defined measure.

Lake Humphreys is a reservoir located northeast of the city of Duncan, Oklahoma, United States. It was created in 1958 with an earthen dam. Its normal capacity is 14,041 acre-feet (17,319,000 m^{3}) of water with an average depth of 40 feet (12 m). The lake covers 882 acres (3.57 km^{2}) encompassed by 16.1 miles (25.9 km) of shoreline. The lake is operated by the city of Duncan.
