= Arcadia Lake (Oklahoma) =

Lake in Oklahoma, U.S.

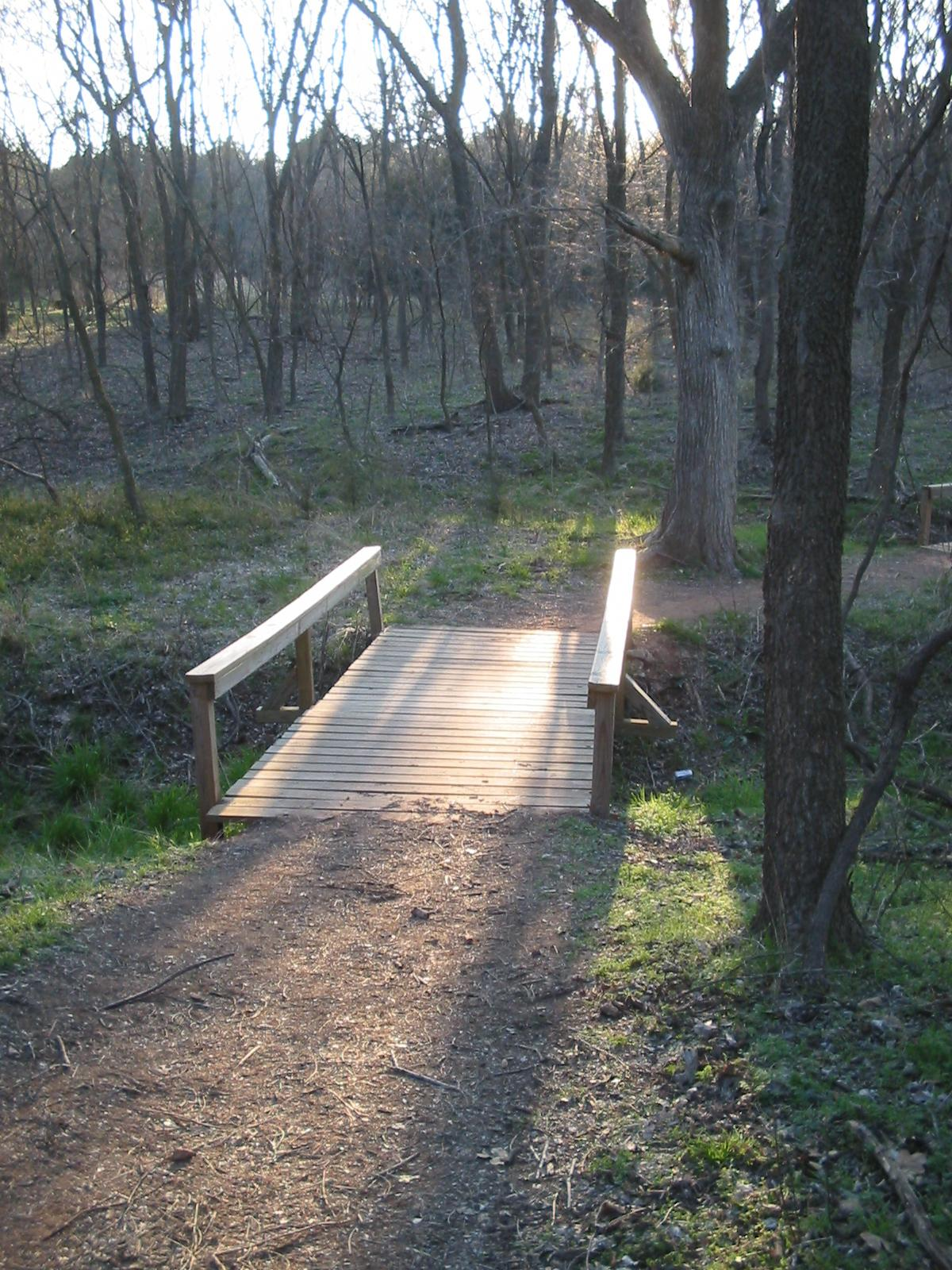
- Foot bridge on a trail at Arcadia Lake

- Location within Oklahoma Location within the United States
- Location: Oklahoma County, Oklahoma
- Coordinates: 35°38′40″N 97°21′45″W
- Type: Reservoir
- Primary inflows: Deep Fork River
- Primary outflows: Deep Fork River
- Basin countries: United States
- Surface area: 1,820 acres (7.4 km^{2})
- Shore length^{1}: 26 mi (42 km)
- Surface elevation: 974 ft (297 m)
- Settlements: Edmond, Oklahoma
- ^{1} Shore length is not a well-defined measure.

Arcadia Lake is a reservoir in Central Oklahoma County, Oklahoma, United States. The lake is located northeast of Oklahoma City in eastern Edmond, just east of Interstate 35.

The lake has a surface area of 1,820 acres (7 km²) and has about 26 miles (42 km) of shoreline.

== History ==
The lake was created in 1984 by an earthen dam on the Deep Fork River begun in 1980 (46 years ago). This lake was constructed as a cooperative effort between the City of Edmond and the United States Army Corps of Engineers. It was created to control floods in the Deep Fork River Basin, supply water to the city of Edmond, Oklahoma, and provide recreational resources to the surrounding communities.

== Recreation ==
Recreational opportunities at Arcadia Lake include fishing, boating, camping, mountain biking, hiking, disc golf and equestrian trails. Waterskiing and jet skiing are both allowed in designated areas. Horse rentals are not available, so visitors must bring their own mounts. Facilities include picnic areas, a Frisbee golf course, pavilions, boat ramps, designated swim beaches and an enclosed and heated fishing dock that is handicapped accessible. Arcadia Lake also has RV campsites with full hook-ups and primitive tent campsites. Parks around the lake include Scissortail Park, Spring Creek Park, Central State Park and Edmond Park.
