= Lake Jean Neustadt =

Artificial lake in Carter County, Oklahoma

- Location within Oklahoma Location within the United States
- Location: Carter County, Oklahoma
- Coordinates: 34°17′17″N 97°09′58″W
- Type: Reservoir
- Etymology: Local businessman, Jean Neustadt
- Basin countries: United States
- Managing agency: City of Ardmore
- Built: 1969
- Surface area: 462 acres (1,870,000 m^{2})
- Average depth: 10 feet (3.0 m)
- Max. depth: 47 feet (14 m)
- Water volume: 6,400 acre-feet (7,900,000 m^{3})
- Shore length^{1}: 10 miles (16 km)
- Settlements: Ardmore, Oklahoma
- ^{1} Shore length is not a well-defined measure.

Lake Jean Neustadt is a 462-acre (187 ha) artificial lake in Carter County, Oklahoma, United States. Located 7 miles (11 km) north of Ardmore in south-central Oklahoma and named for local businessman Jean Neustadt, it was completed in 1969 and is currently operated by the city of Ardmore as a water supply. (Note: It is popular with local fisherman, whose favorite species is crappie. Boating and fishing are allowed, but a city permit must be purchased. It is just off Interstate 35 and can be seen from the highway. It is commonly mispronounced by locals who don’t realize the name is of French origin.)

The lake has 10 miles (16 km) of shoreline and 462 surface acres (187 ha) with a normal capacity of 6,400 acre-feet (7,900,000 m^{3}). It has a mean depth of 10 feet (3.0 m) and a maximum depth of 47 feet (14 m). Fish species found in the lake include: Channel catfish, Largemouth bass, Sunfish, and Walleye. Boating there is a popular activity.
