= Bell Cow Lake =

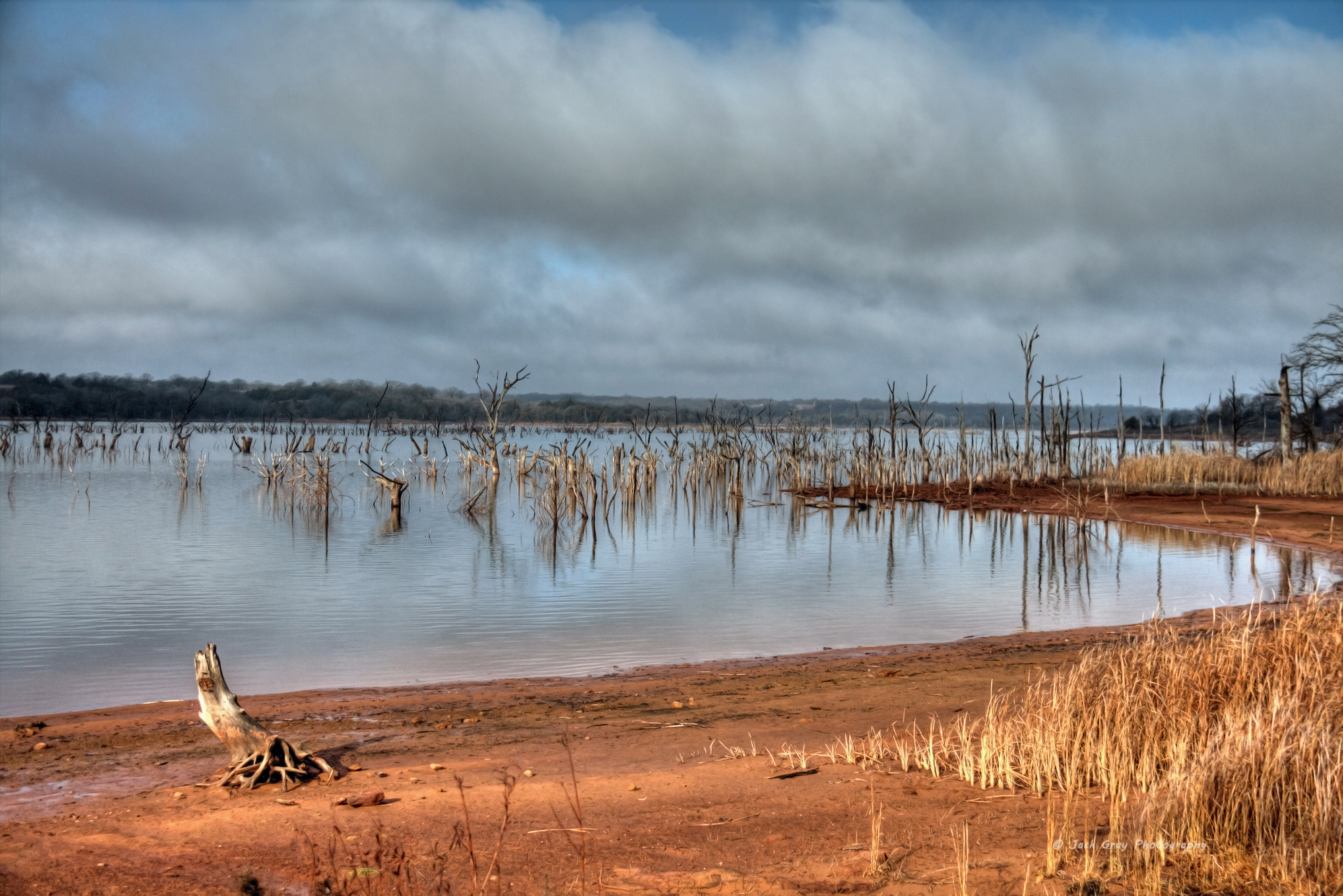

- Location within Oklahoma Location within the United States
- Location: Chandler, Oklahoma
- Coordinates: 35°44′11″N 96°56′25″W
- Type: reservoir
- Primary inflows: Bell Cow Creek
- Primary outflows: Bell Cow Creek
- Basin countries: United States
- Max. length: 1 mile (1.6 km)
- Max. width: 3.5 miles (5.6 km)
- Surface area: 1,153 acres (4,670,000 m^{2})
- Max. depth: 39 feet (12 m)
- Water volume: 15,613 acre-feet (19,258,000 m^{3})
- Shore length^{1}: 13 miles (21 km)
- Surface elevation: 892 feet (272 m)
- Settlements: Chandler, Oklahoma
- ^{1} Shore length is not a well-defined measure.

Bell Cow Lake (sometimes written as Bellcow) is a reservoir located within the city limits of Chandler, Oklahoma, in a section of the city located to the northwest of its central district, just off Interstate 44 and Oklahoma State Highway 18.

The lake was constructed on Bell Cow Creek for flood control, water supply, recreation, and fish and wildlife purposes. The lake surface covers 1,153 acres (4,670,000 m^{2}). Four recreational areas cover another 1,000 square feet (93 m^{2}), offering boating, fishing, swimming, camping, picnicking, and horseback riding. Its overall dimensions are 3.5 miles (5.6 km) wide by 1 mile (1.6 km) long, and it opened officially in January, 1994.
