= Waurika Lake =

Reservoir in Oklahoma, US

- Location within Oklahoma Location within the United States
- Location: Jefferson County, Oklahoma
- Coordinates: 34°16′55″N 98°04′40″W
- Type: Reservoir
- Primary inflows: Beaver Creek, Oklahoma
- Primary outflows: Beaver Creek, Oklahoma
- Catchment area: 562 mi^{2} (1,460 km^{2})
- Managing agency: U.S. Army Corps of Engineers
- Built: 1973
- First flooded: 1980
- Max. length: 11 mi (18 km)
- Surface area: 10,000 acres (4,000 ha)
- Water volume: 192,000 acre⋅ft (0.237 km^{3})
- Shore length^{1}: 80 mi (130 km)
- Surface elevation: 951 ft (290 m)
- Settlements: Waurika, Oklahoma
- ^{1} Shore length is not a well-defined measure.

Waurika Lake is a reservoir in southwestern Oklahoma, near Waurika. It is primarily in Jefferson County, but small parts of it are in Stephens County and Cotton County, Oklahoma. Its primary purposes are to provide flood control, irrigation, water supply, water quality, fish and wildlife, recreation, and other conservation needs of the public. The lake supplies water for the cities of Lawton, Duncan, Comanche, Temple, and Waurika. The wildlife management area comprises about 6,040 acres (24.4 km^{2}).

Continued operation of the lake water pumping system is being jeopardized by a buildup of silt near the water intake. The extremely hot summers of 2011-2013 have caused excessive evaporation of lake water and unusually high consumption by communities that use the water. Water officials estimated that pumping may have had to cease in April 2015, unless corrective actions could be taken soon, although an extremely rainy storm season in May of that year raised the lake levels to 90.36% capacity.. As of April 2025, the Waurika lake sits at 88.73% capacity, according to the corps of engineers. The multiple communities currently using the Waurika lake as their primary source of drinking water, have made this capacity the new "Full capacity". This consumption continues to threaten the future of Waurika lake.

== Description ==
Waurika Dam is on Beaver Creek, a tributary of the Red River, about 6 miles (9.7 km) northwest of Waurika. The lake drainage area is 562 square miles (1,460 km^{2}).

Construction of Waurika Dam began in 1963, with completion of the project occurring in 1980. The lake is 11 miles (18 km) long and contains 192,000 acre feet of water at its normal elevation, 951 feet (290 m). The surface covers about 10,000 acres (40 km^{2}) and has 80 miles (130 km) of shoreline.

== Environmental issues ==
Prolonged drought in southwestern Oklahoma during 2011 – 12 has caused serious harm to the lake. Water conservation steps, including severe restrictions on lawn watering and higher customer fees, have been implemented by the cities who consume the lake water. Evaporation losses have been high, and there are concerns about the increased rate of silting. Drought conditions are also conducive to the formation of harmful algae.

=== 2011 Algae bloom ===
During August 2011, the Oklahoma Department of Environmental Quality found high concentrations of blue-green algae in lake water samples and banned human contact with untreated lake water. This algae contains toxins that are very hazardous to humans. In response, the Corps of Engineers shut down the two swimming beaches there. By late December algae concentrations had dropped sufficiently to lift the ban, although the agencies were still discouraging water contact.

=== 2013 Silt accumulation ===
In June 2013, an Oklahoma Water Resources Board study disclosed that a build-up of clay and dirt had accumulated close to the water pump intake. This was the result of high evaporation rates and high water consumption. The lake received about 4 inches (10 cm) of rain in April 2013, but that would only extend the life of the lake about one week.

Water officials have called for mandatory 10 percent reductions in the supply to users as one way to extend the life of the system. Dredging the sediment is also being considered. Removing the accumulated material is expected to cost between $2.5 and $6 million. The dredging project could begin in 2014, but funding must be found first.

Officials also pointed out that the current low levels of lake water present additional safety hazards for lake users. Low levels are exposing old trees, bridge piers and other obstacles. The water has low visibility and there are a lot of dropoffs in the bottom.
