= Lake Bixhoma =

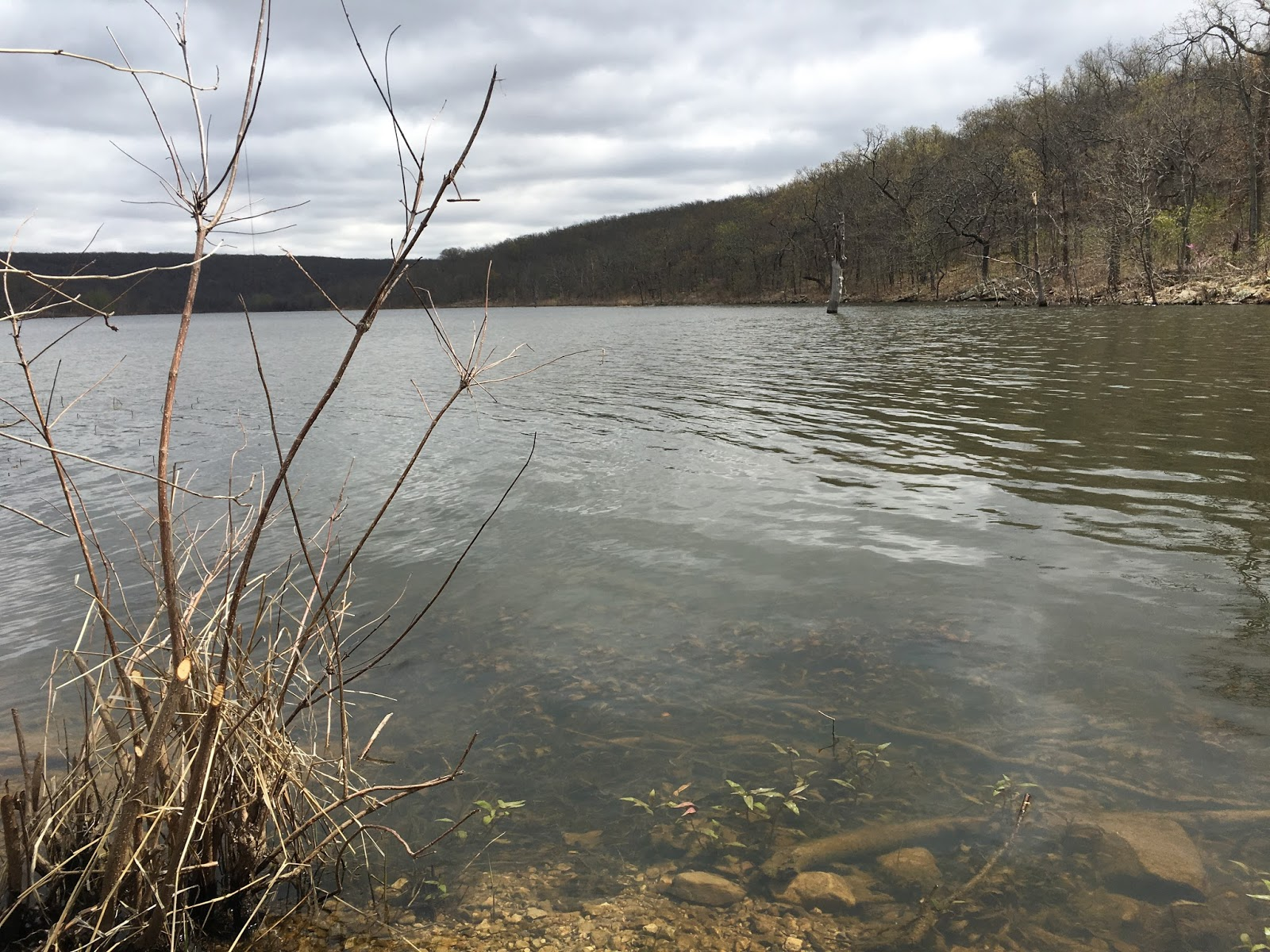

- Location within Oklahoma Location within the United States
- Location: Oklahoma
- Coordinates: 35°53′38″N 95°47′54″W
- Basin countries: United States
- Built: 1965
- Surface area: 110 acres (45 ha)
- Max. depth: 50 ft (15 m)
- Shore length^{1}: 3 miles (4.8 km)
- Surface elevation: 899 ft (274 m)
- ^{1} Shore length is not a well-defined measure.

Lake Bixhoma, is a public reservoir owned and operated by the city of Bixby, Oklahoma. Lake Bixhoma has 3 miles (4.8 km) of shoreline, a surface area of 110 acres (45 ha) and a maximum depth of 50 feet (15 m). It is located on Bixhoma Lake Road about 7 miles southeast of Bixby, and 2.2 miles south of U.S. 64 and the community of Leonard, Oklahoma. Built in 1965, it is situated on Leonard Mountain at an elevation of 899 feet (274 m) above sea level, nearly 300 feet (91 m) above the elevation of Bixby (600 feet (183 m) above sea level), and was originally built to supply raw water to the city.

== Recreation and amenities ==
Fishing is allowed from the bank or by boat (with a low-wake zone enforced over the entire lake), but swimming is prohibited. Kayaking and stand-up paddleboarding are popular activities. Daily fishing or boating permits are required for all persons intending to engage in those activities on the lake, regardless of age. Permits are issued by the city of Bixby at the City Hall, and as of 2017 were $5.00 per day or $15.00 per year, with no charge for persons ages 65 years old or over and for children age 11 years old and under. Fishing is regulated with a daily bag limit of five fish applied to largemouth or spotted bass, and catfish, in addition to state bag limits on all other species including crappie and panfish. Amenities at the lake include two boat ramps, floating fishing docks, and picnic areas with charcoal grills and fire pits. The area around Lake Bixhoma consists of undeveloped, heavily forested and rocky hills, and when water is flowing from the reservoir outlet (dependent upon rainfall and resultant lake level) the stream below the lake contains a series of small waterfalls accessible by a trail. There are also several other trails that surround the park. Access to the lake is open all days from 6:00am – 10:00pm.

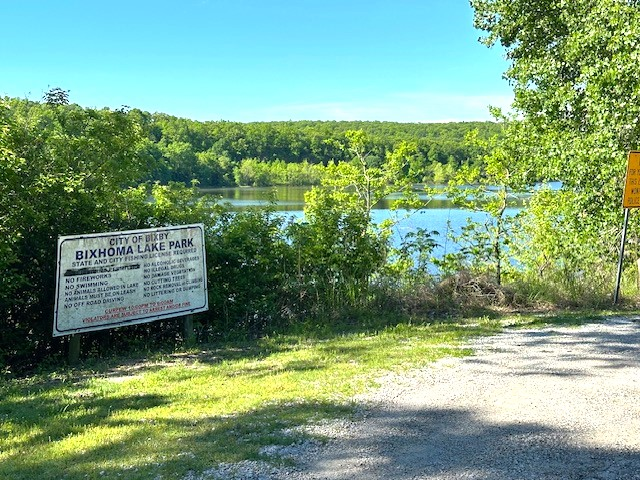
Bixby's Bixhoma Lake Park in May, 2025
