= Claremore Lake =

Reservoir in Rogers County, Oklahoma, US

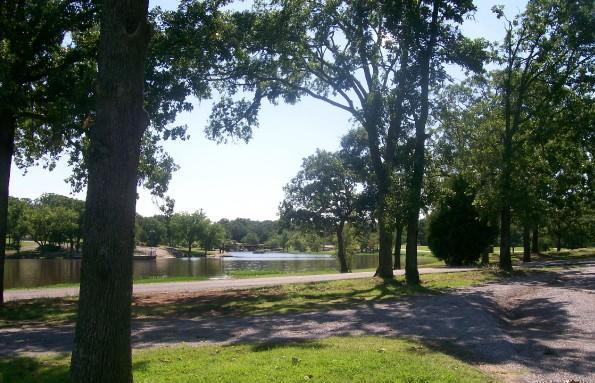
- Claremore Lake

- Location within Oklahoma Location within the United States
- Location: Rogers County, Oklahoma
- Coordinates: 36°20′25″N 95°34′10″W
- Basin countries: United States
- Surface area: 470 acres (1.9 km^{2})
- Average depth: 16.8 ft (5.1 m)
- Max. depth: 25 ft (7.6 m)
- Water volume: 7,900 acre⋅ft (9,700,000 m^{3})
- Shore length^{1}: 9 mi (14 km)
- Surface elevation: 610 ft (190 m)
- Settlements: Claremore
- ^{1} Shore length is not a well-defined measure.

Claremore Lake is a reservoir in Rogers County, Oklahoma. Constructed in 1929–1930 by damming Dog Creek for the purpose of providing water to the city of Claremore, Oklahoma and houses recreational amenities such as boat ramps, fishing docks, and picnic areas. In 2011, the lake added a 9-hole disc golf course.

The lake has a capacity of 7,900 acre-feet (9,700,000 m^{3}), covers 470 acres (1.9 km^{2})

Claremore Lake Park comprises 1,200 acres (4,900,000 m^{2}) off of East Blue Starr Drive in Claremore. The park has two separate playgrounds and has picnic tables and grills available for public use. There are also two covered shelters with electrical outlets. Shelters can be rented through the Claremore Parks and Recreation Department. Camping is not allowed, and animals must be restrained at all times. Alcohol is prohibited.
