= Birch Lake (Oklahoma) =

Lake in Osage County, Oklahoma, U.S.

- Location within Oklahoma Location within the United States
- Location: Osage County, Oklahoma
- Coordinates: 36°32′03″N 96°09′46″W
- Primary inflows: Birch Creek (Oklahoma)
- Primary outflows: Birch Creek (Oklahoma)
- Basin countries: United States
- Surface area: 1,137 acres (460 ha)
- Water volume: 52,800 acre-feet (65,100,000 m^{3})
- Shore length^{1}: 27 mi (43 km)
- Surface elevation: 695 ft (212 m)
- Settlements: Barnsdall, Oklahoma
- ^{1} Shore length is not a well-defined measure.

Birch Lake is a lake 1.5 miles (2.4 km) south of Barnsdall, Oklahoma, Oklahoma, 20 miles (32 km) southwest of Bartlesville and 30 miles (48 km) northwest of Tulsa. The drainage area for Birch Lake is 66 square miles (170 km^{2}). Its area covers 1,137 acres (4.60 km^{2}) (conservation level). The total capacity is: 52,800 acre-feet (65,100,000 m^{3}), subdivided into: Conservation 15,800 acre-feet (19,500,000 m^{3}), Flood control 39,000 acre-feet (48,000,000 m^{3}), and Inactive storage 15,840 acre-feet (19,540,000 m^{3}).

The lake is formed from Birch Creek, a tributary of Bird Creek. It eventually empties into the Arkansas River. It is twenty miles (32 km) southwest of Bartlesville, Oklahoma.

The lake has largemouth bass, walleye, spotted bass, smallmouth bass, hybrid striped bass, black and white crappie, channel and flathead catfish, and different types of sunfish. The marine law enforcement branch of the Oklahoma Highway Patrol, Troop W, is headquartered at Birch Lake.
