= Holdenville Lake =

- Location within Oklahoma Location within the United States
- Location: Hughes County, Oklahoma
- Coordinates: 35°01′52″N 96°21′40″W
- Type: Reservoir
- Etymology: City of Holdenville
- Primary inflows: Beemore Creek
- Primary outflows: Beemore Creek
- Basin countries: United States
- Built: 1932
- First flooded: March 1933
- Surface area: 550 acres (2.2 km^{2})
- Max. depth: 45.9 ft (14.0 m)
- Water volume: 11,000 acre⋅ft (14,000,000 m^{3})
- Shore length^{1}: 11.3 miles (18.2 km)
- Surface elevation: 787 ft (240 m)
- Settlements: Holdenville, Oklahoma
- ^{1} Shore length is not a well-defined measure.

Holdenville Lake, also called Lake Holdenville, is a reservoir in Hughes County, Oklahoma. Owned and operated by the City of Holdenville, Oklahoma, it supplies most of the drinking water for Hughes County. It is just 3.5 miles (5.6 km) south of Holdenville and a 1.5 hour drive from Oklahoma City.

== History ==
Unlike many of Oklahoma's major lakes which began as projects of large state or Federal government agencies, Holdenville Lake was conceived by local residents. In 2013, there was much local publicity announcing the 90th birthday of the lake, and recalling how the lake came to exist.

Reportedly, then City Engineer, Clarence Edge was hunting squirrels in the Beemore Creek area, when he realized how suitable the location would be for a large lake, if the creek were dammed. The timing of Edge's vision was fortuitous. When he reported it to his colleagues in the city government, he learned that they were already trying to find a new source of potable water. The city had been pumping from Little River, but that was already showing evidence of pollution from the oil boom at Asher Field, farther north in the county. Time would be of the essence, when Holdenville would have to replace this source. Edge was told to follow up with surveys of the acreage he had described. Edge's reports must have been very persuasive, because Holdenville soon voted for a bond issue to buy land along Bemoore Creek, clear timber and to begin work on the dam. J, J, Harrison Co. of Lindsay, Oklahoma, won the construction contract and began work in early 1932. The project was completed a year later, in March 1933.

== General description ==
The lake covers 550 acres (2.2 km^{2}) and has 11.3 miles (18.2 km) of shoreline. The maximum depth is 45.9 feet (14.0 m), and it has a capacity of 11,000 acre-feet (14,000,000 m^{3}).

== Fishing ==
The Oklahoma Department of Wildlife Conservation (ODWC) operates a bass fishery here, (Note: The Holdenville State Fish Hatchery is just downstream of the Lake Holdenville Dam.) and manages the lake to optimize production of trophy bass. The lake also has sizable populations of channel, blue and flathead catfish. In recent years, saugeye have been stocked to control the population of crappie. The ODWC has installed several fish attractors. Most of these are marked with buoys, but the ODWC website has posted GPS coordinates for all of them, to further assist fishermen.
