= Boomer Lake =

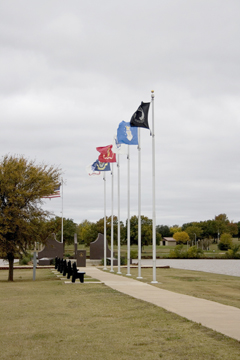
- Trail around Boomer Lake

- Location within Oklahoma Location within the United States
- Location: Stillwater, Oklahoma, United States
- Coordinates: 36°08′37″N 97°03′56″W
- Type: Reservoir
- Primary inflows: Boomer Creek
- Primary outflows: Boomer Creek
- Built: 1925
- Surface area: 251 acres (102 ha)
- Average depth: 9.7 ft (3.0 m)
- Water volume: 1,484 acre⋅ft (1,830,000 m^{3})
- Shore length^{1}: 8.6 mi (13.8 km)
- Surface elevation: 896 ft (273 m)
- Settlements: Stillwater, Oklahoma
- ^{1} Shore length is not a well-defined measure.

Boomer Lake is located in the city of Stillwater, Oklahoma, United States, and was completed in 1925. The lake, as an artificial reservoir created by damming Boomer Creek, serves several purposes such as cooling the local power plant and providing entertainment and recreation. Boomer Lake has a surface area of 251 acres (1,020,000 m^{2}), watershed area of 8,954 acres (36,240,000 m^{2}), shoreline length of 8.6 miles (13.8 km), shoreline development ratio of 4.17, and mean depth of 9.7 feet (3.0 m). The lake was designed to contain 3,600 acre-feet (4,400,000 m^{3}) in 1932, but in 2010 the capacity was reportedly only 1,484 acre-feet (1,830,000 m^{3}).

In 2011 Boomer Lake underwent severe drying due to lack of water, with water levels dropping as much as 15 ft and the shoreline receding up to 40 ft in some areas.

The lake serves as a great source for fishing and contains many varieties of fish such as largemouth bass, hybrid bass, saugeye, channel catfish, flathead catfish, crappie and many species of sunfish.

== David L. Payne gravesite ==
The grave site of David L. Payne, a famous figure in pre-statehood history of Oklahoma is on Boomer Lake, where he was reinterred in 1995.

== Fish Advisory ==
In 2010, the Oklahoma State Department of Environmental Quality issued a fish advisory for the largemouth bass in the lake, with elevated mercury levels detected in the lake's population of largemouth bass. Other species of fish do not fall under the advisory. The advisory cautions against eating more than two servings per month of bass longer than 19 inches in length, and suggests children and women of childbearing age should restrict consumption to two servings per month of fish between 16-19 inches. As of early 2014, this advisory remained in effect.
