= Carl Blackwell Lake =

Lake Carl Blackwell
- Location within Oklahoma Location within the United States
- Location: Payne County, Oklahoma, US
- Coordinates: 36°08′02″N 97°13′26″W
- Type: Reservoir
- Primary inflows: Stillwater Creek
- Primary outflows: Stillwater Creek
- Basin countries: United States
- Built: 1937
- Surface area: 3,370 acres (13,600,000 m^{2})
- Max. depth: 45.9 feet (14.0 m)
- Water volume: 61,500 acre-feet (75,900,000 m^{3})
- Shore length^{1}: 59.2 miles (95.3 km)
- Surface elevation: 944 feet (288 m)
- Settlements: Stillwater, Oklahoma
- ^{1} Shore length is not a well-defined measure.

Lake Carl Blackwell, also known as Carl Blackwell Lake, is 8 miles (13 km) west of Stillwater, Oklahoma, United States. Primarily a recreational area, it is almost midway between Tulsa and Oklahoma City. It was constructed in 1937. The lake is owned and operated by Oklahoma State University (OSU).

== General description ==
The lake has a surface area of 3,370 acres (13.6 km^{2}), a capacity of 61,500 acre-feet (0.0759 km^{3}), a shoreline of 59.2 miles (95.3 km) and a normal surface elevation of 944 feet (288 m). The maximum depth has been reported as 45.9 feet (14.0 m).

== Recreation area ==
An 800 acres (3,200,000 m^{2}) recreation area adjoins the lake. It is also owned and managed by OSU. Activities include camping, horseback riding trails, mountain bike trails, boating, hiking, fishing, duck hunting and picnicking.

== Shooting center ==
A controversial shooting center (gun range) was approved by the OSU regents in 2017. An environmental impact assessment (EIR) was underway in April 2018, and the Oklahoma Department of Wildlife Conservation is applying for construction funding from the Wildlife Conservation Program.

The center would fence off a 358 acres (1,450,000 m^{2}) part of the Blackwell Lake recreational area to include an archery range, two rifle ranges, a pistol range, a sporting clay course, four skeet fields, three skeet or trap fields and four trap fields along with amenities like parking and restrooms. It would also be open to the public for training and hunter safety programs. The estimated annual cost is $415,000.

Future projects, according to the OSU construction project manage include adding a conservation center, nature trail, two sporting clay courses, a FITASC shooting competition parkours, 3-D archery and a pavilion with restrooms.

Opposition has come mainly from Lake Blackwell equestrian group who had been putting their own labor and money into building the riding trails that will be eliminated by the new facility since the 1960s. Group members have said that they have built a 50 miles (80 km) riding trail complex, they built Hunt's Meadow, a primitive 19-site campground, picnic tables and hitching posts.

== Invasive lily treatment ==
In June, 2019, Oklahoma State University announced that it was beginning to treat Lake Carl Blackwell with a species-selective herbicide ProcellaCOR SC to control the spread of an invasive species of lily called "Yellow Floating Heart" (YFH). The plant is non-native, outproduces native plants and forms dense surface mats that reduce the productivity of the water. Attempts to remove it mechanically have failed, and even have caused more rapid spreading because every leaf or stem that floats away can colonize another part of the lake, according to lake manager, Brian Brinker. The herbicide has been classed by EPA as a low-risk chemical that does not require mandatory water testing before, during or after treatment, although OSU planned to do daily testing and for three days afterward. (Note: "ProcellaCOR SC" is said to biodegrade below detectable limits within three days after application and has been used in Texas, Louisiana and Wisconsin.) OSU will cease using water from Blackwell and switch to water from the City of Stillwater. OSU will switch back to Carl Blackwell water about two weeks after tests show no pesticide is present.

YFH has been banned in several states, notably including Michigan, Minnesota and Wisconsin.
