= Sooner Lake =

- Location within Oklahoma Location within the United States
- Coordinates: 36°26′10″N 97°02′00″W
- Type: reservoir
- Primary inflows: Arkansas River
- Primary outflows: Arkansas River
- Managing agency: Oklahoma Gas and Electric Company (OG&E)
- First flooded: 1972
- Surface area: 5,400 acres (2,200 ha)
- Average depth: 28 ft (8.5 m)
- Max. depth: 89 ft (27 m)
- Water volume: 149,000 acre⋅ft (184 hm^{3})
- Shore length^{1}: 42 mi (68 km)
- Surface elevation: 927 ft (283 m)
- ^{1} Shore length is not a well-defined measure.

Sooner Lake is a reservoir in Pawnee and Noble counties in the U.S. state of Oklahoma. It was built in 1972 to serve as a reservoir of cooling water for a coal-fired power generation plant owned by Oklahoma Gas and Electric Company (OG&E). The plant is at the northwest end of the lake. The normal elevation is 927 feet (283 m). Maximum depth is 89 feet (27 m) and average depth is 28 feet (8.5 m). The lake covers 5,400 acres (22 km^{2}) and has a water capacity of 149,000 acre-feet (184,000,000 m^{3}). The shoreline is 42 miles (68 km) long.

The lake is not far from the Arkansas River. It was originally filled by pumping water from the river and is maintained at the desired level the same way.

Sooner Lake includes a wildlife preserve and is the home to bald eagles during the winter months. Eagle cameras have been placed at nesting sites and can be viewed online.
