= Watonga Lake =

- Location within Oklahoma Location within the United States
- Location: Blaine County, Oklahoma
- Coordinates: 35°56′33″N 98°25′23″W
- Type: Reservoir
- Basin countries: United States
- Built: 1955
- Surface area: 55 acres (22 ha)
- Average depth: 11.9 ft (3.6 m)
- Max. depth: 26 ft (7.9 m)
- Water volume: 656 acre⋅ft (809,000 m^{3})
- Shore length^{1}: 2.5 miles (4.0 km)
- Surface elevation: 1,375 ft (419 m)
- Settlements: Watonga, Oklahoma
- ^{1} Shore length is not a well-defined measure.

Watonga Lake is a reservoir in Blaine County, Oklahoma. It is 7 miles (11 km) north of Watonga, Oklahoma. Constructed by the Oklahoma Department of Wildlife Conservation (ODWC) in 1955, is adjacent to Roman Nose State Park, with which it shares many recreational facilities.

== Etymology ==
The name Watonga was that of an Arapaho tribe leader (also given as woteen-kotuh'oo) meaning "black coyote."

== Description ==
The lake is small, compared to many of the other lakes and reservoirs in the state. The surface area is 55 acres (22 ha), the rated capacity is 656 acre-feet (809,000 m^{3}), the shore line is 2.5 miles (4.0 km), average depth is 11.9 feet (3.6 m) and the maximum depth is 26 feet (7.9 m) The elevation is 1,375 feet (419 m).
