= Newt Graham Lock & Dam =

Newt Graham Lock and Dam (#18)
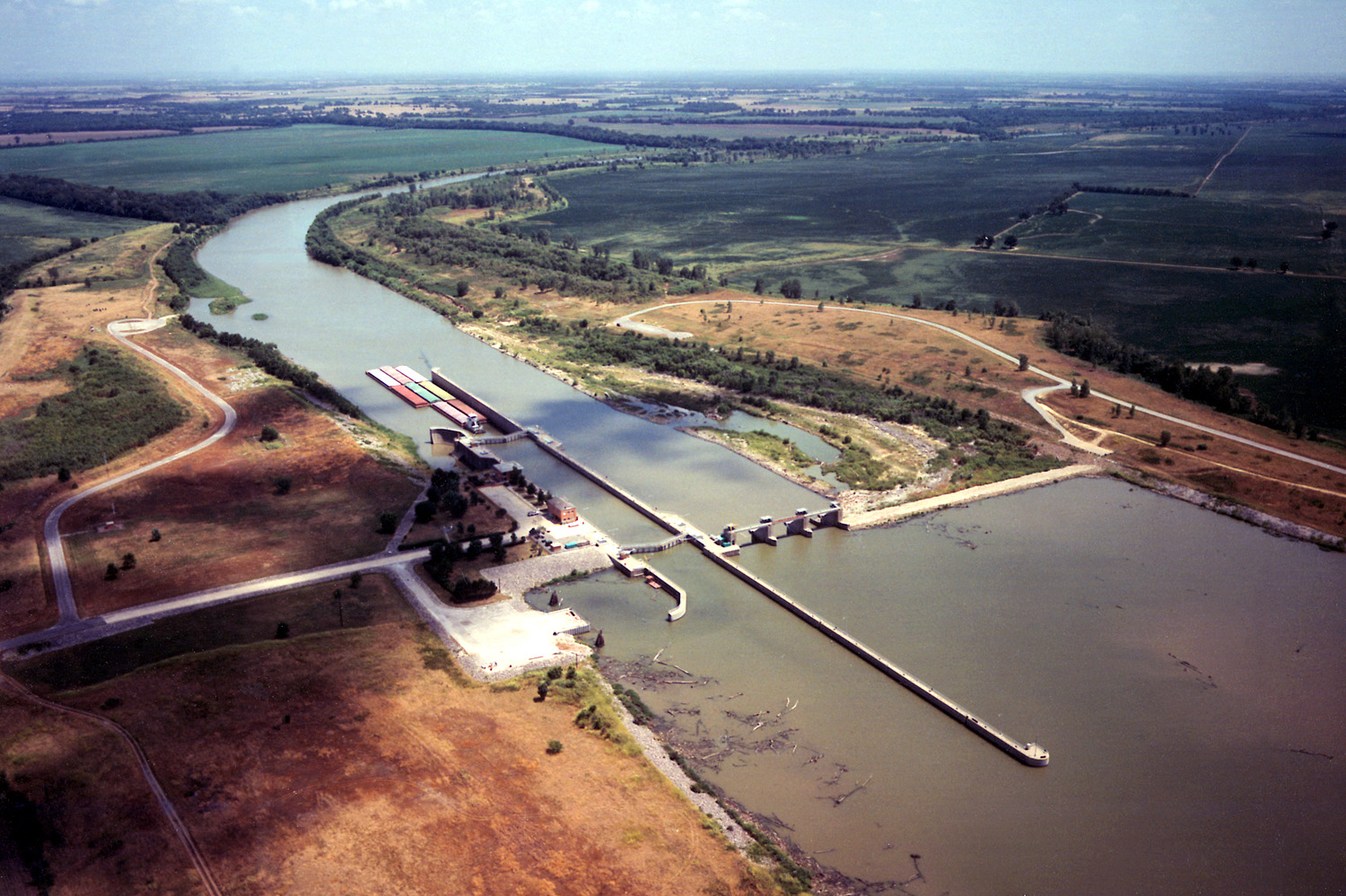
- Newt Graham Lock and Dam on the Verdigris River looking south. March 3, 1999. U.S. Army Corps of Engineers Digital Visual Library.
- Interactive map of Newt Graham Lock and Dam (#18)
- Country: United States
- Coordinates: 36°03′32″N 95°32′15″W
- Purpose: Navigation
- Construction began: 1967
- Opening date: 1970
- Built by: U.S. Army Corps of Engineers
- Operator: U.S. Army Corps of Engineers

Dam and spillways
- Impounds: Verdigris River

Reservoir
- Creates: Newt Graham Reservoir
- Total capacity: 24,260 acre⋅ft (29,920,000 m^{3})
- Surface area: 1,490 acres (600 ha)
- Normal elevation: 532 ft (162 m)

Newt Graham Lock & Dam (also known as Newt Graham Lock and Dam 18, Newt Graham Lake, Newt Graham Reservoir and Newt Graham Pool.) is the final lock and dam of the McClellan-Kerr Arkansas River Navigation System (MKARNS) before reaching the western terminus, Tulsa Port of Catoosa on the Verdigris River. The lock and dam is 24.8 miles (39.9 km) downstream of the port.

== Nearby cities and towns ==
The Newt Graham Lock & Dam is approximately 7 miles (11 km) south of Inola, Oklahoma.

- Broken Arrow, Oklahoma is 5 miles (8.0 km) due west.
- Wagoner, Oklahoma is 25 miles (40 km) southeast.
- Pryor, Oklahoma is 25 miles (40 km) northeast.

Construction started in 1967 and was completed in 1970. Estimated cost of the project was $43.4 million.

== Recreation ==
=== Fishing and Hunting ===
The waters around Newt Graham Lock & Dam have a plentiful supply of fish. People who wish to fish must have current Oklahoma fishing licenses. The most common species are: largemouth bass, striped bass, crappie, channel catfish, flatheads and sunfish.

The U.S. Army Corps of Engineers manages two boat landings on the Lock 18 Pool: Bluff Landing and Highway 33 Landing. Camping is allowed only at Bluff Landing, where camping and day use fees are collected. Camping is prohibited at Highway 33 Landing, which is limited to boat launching and day use. Boat launching is free at this landing. There are 25 campsites with electrical hookups and 7 without. Campsites are open year-round.

Hunting in the area around the Lock 18 Pool is governed by the same Federal and state laws and regulations as elsewhere in Oklahoma. License requirements are also the same. Popular species for hunters here are: whitetail deer, dove, quail, squirrel, rabbit, turkey and several species of migratory waterfowl.
