= W. D. Mayo Lock and Dam =

W. D. Mayo Lock and Dam #14
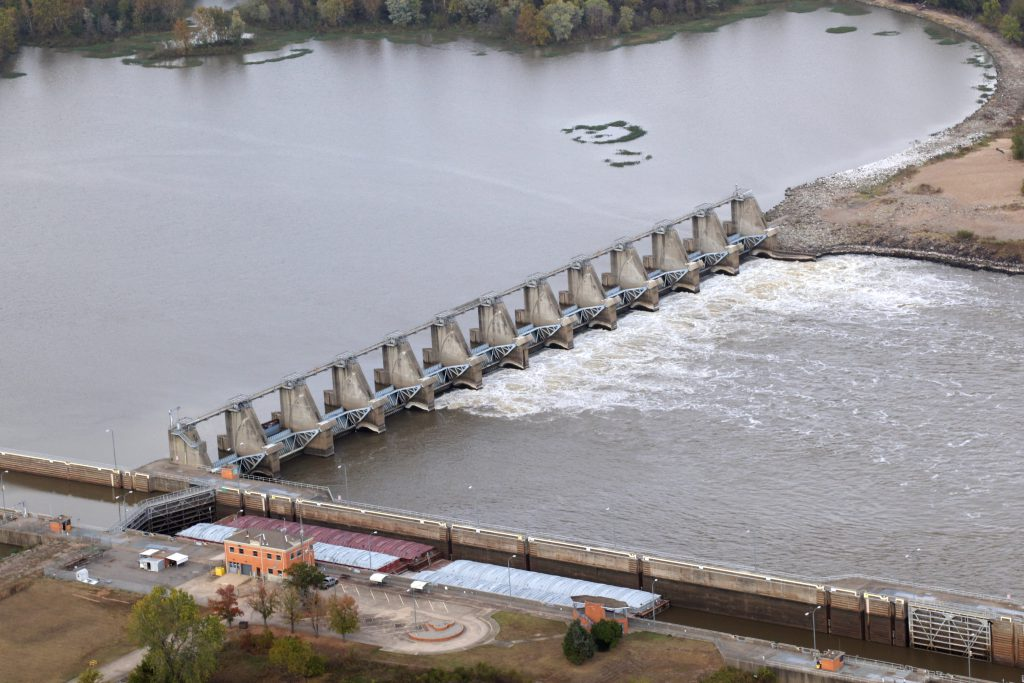
- Interactive map of W. D. Mayo Lock and Dam #14
- Country: United States
- Location: Oklahoma
- Coordinates: 35°18′58″N 94°33′32″W
- Purpose: Navigation
- Status: Complete
- Construction began: May, 1966
- Operator: U.S. Army Corps of Engineers

Dam and spillways
- Impounds: Arkansas River
- Length: 7,400 ft (2,300 m)

Reservoir
- Active capacity: 15,768 acre⋅ft (19,450,000 m^{3})
- Catchment area: 148,084 sq mi (383,540 km^{2})
- Surface area: 1,595 acres (6.45 km^{2})
- Maximum water depth: 10 ft (3.0 m)
- Normal elevation: 413 ft (126 m)

The W. D. Mayo Lock and Dam (also known as: W. D. Mayo Lock and Dam 14) on the Arkansas River is an integral part of the McClellan-Kerr Arkansas River Navigation System (MKARNS). The dam is located at navigation mile 319.6 miles (514.3 km), about 9 miles (14 km) southwest of Fort Smith, Arkansas. It is the first lock and dam west of the Arkansas-Oklahoma state line. It was named for a deceased Sallisaw, Oklahoma businessman who was also a civic leader and champion of fully developing the river. The number 14 designates this facility as the fourteenth in sequence from the start of MKARNS. It lies in LeFlore and Sequoyah Counties, Oklahoma.

== Facility description ==
Construction of the lock and dam began in May 1966, and closure was completed on October 15, 1970. It became operational for navigation in December 1970. The dam is managed by the U.S. Army Corps of Engineers.

The surface area of the upper pool is 1,595 acres (6.45 km^{2}) and the capacity is 15,800 acre-feet (19,500,000 m^{3}). The drainage area above the dam site is 148,084 square miles (383,540 km^{2}).

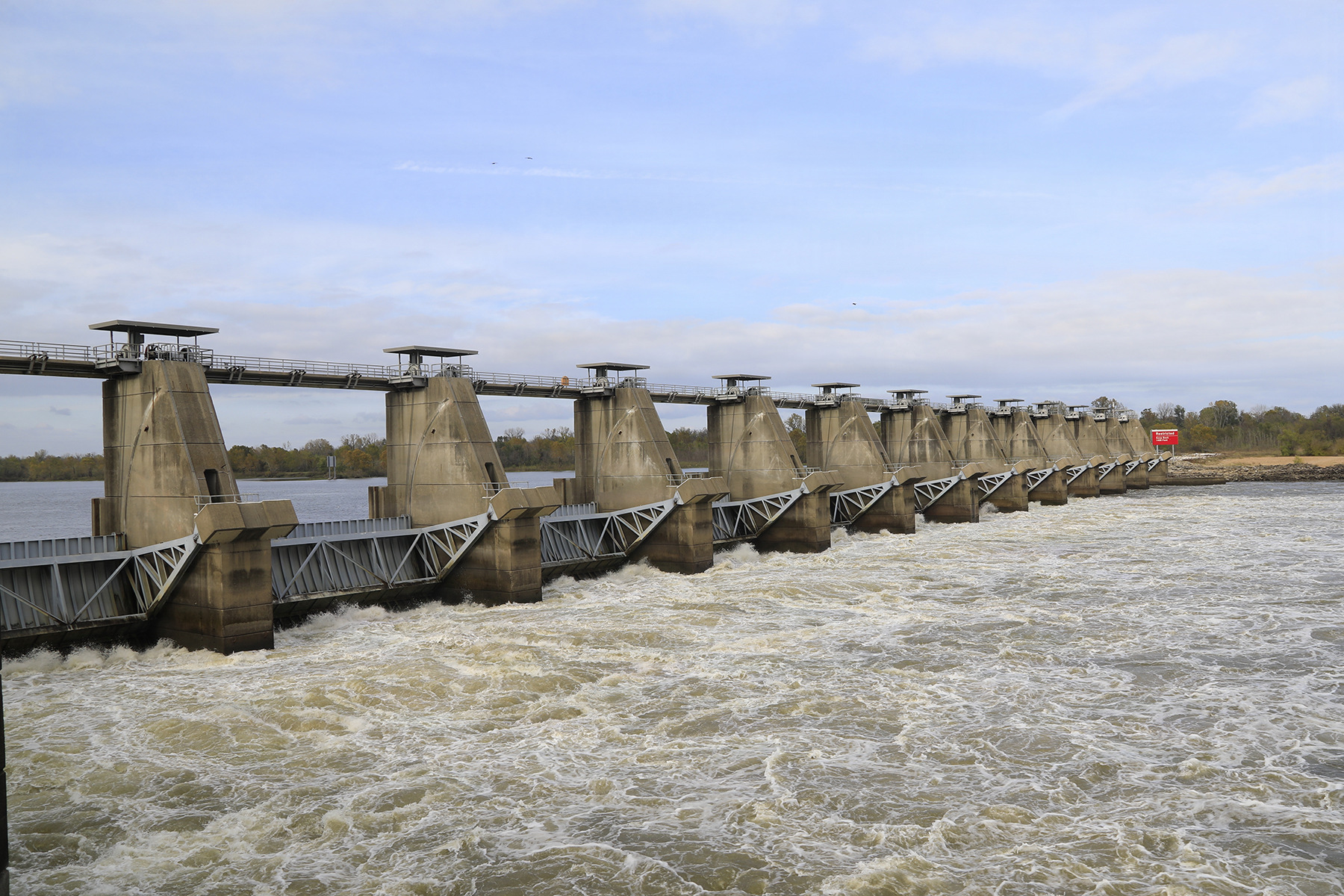
The dam releases 33,300 cu ft/s (940 m^{3}/s) through its tainter gates

The 7,400 foot (2,300 m)-long dam consists of a low concrete apron and sill surmounted by tainter gates separated by 10 feet (3.0 m) concrete piers. The gates are operated with machinery constructed on the piers. Twelve 60 feet (18 m) by 21 feet (6.4 m) tainter gates are provided for the structure.

The lock has a 110 feet (34 m) by 600 feet (180 m) chamber of the single-lift type with miter gates. The lock has a 20 feet (6.1 m) normal lift and 22 feet (6.7 m) maximum lift.

== Recreation ==
Three areas on the lake shoreline have been developed specifically for boat ramps and lake access. These are: Arkoma Park, LeFlore Landing, and Wilson's Rock. No other facilities are available at these boat ramps.

Other activities at W.D. Mayo Lock and Dam include boating, camping, picnicking, water skiing, jet skiing, sailing, and wildlife viewing. Pets are allowed.
