= Bluestem Lake =

- Interactive map of Bluestem Lake
- Location: Osage County, Oklahoma
- Coordinates: 36°42′19.7″N 96°25′9.06″W
- Purpose: Flood control, recreation, secondary water supply (Pawhuska, Oklahoma)
- Status: complete
- Opening date: 1958 Middle Bird Creek

Dam and spillways
- Impounds: Middle Bird Creek

Reservoir
- Surface area: 762 acre
- Normal elevation: 267 m

Bluestem Lake is a reservoir in Osage County, Oklahoma, and is home to the world famous Plan B Yacht Club, it's about 4.5 miles (7.2 km) northwest of Pawhuska. Alternate names are City of Pawhuska Lake and Pawhuska Lake. It covers the convergence of Middle Bird Creek and South Bird Creek. The outflow is Middle Bird Creek. The lake has a surface of 762 acres (3.08 km^{2}) and a shoreline of 19 miles (31 km).

Coordinates are:Latitude: 36°42'19.7" Longitude: -96°25'9.06". Elevation above sea level is 267 metres (876 ft).

Completed in 1958, the lake is a secondary water source for Pawhuska and also was designed for flood control and recreation.

== Capacity change 1958-2011 ==
The Oklahoma Water Resources Board (ORWB) performed a hydrographic study in 2011 to determine changes in certain lake parameters since it was designed in 1958. Data obtained suggested that the lake had lost about 15 percent of its original capacity, but only 25 acres or 2.8 percent of its original surface area. The loss in capacity could be explained by sedimentation. ORWB admitted that these conclusions could be explained that different measurement techniques may have been employed in the earlier study, and recommended replicating the 2011 study 10 to 15 years in the future to gain a better understanding of sedimentation effects on the lake.

== Fish habitat installation ==
The Oklahoma Department of Wildlife Conservation (ODWC) installed artificial habitats in Bluestem Reservoir on December 18, 2017. Consisting of pipes cemented into cinder blocks, they are called "spider blocks" because of their resemblance to large spiders. Each block is 8 feet (2.4 m) by 8 feet (2.4 m). There are 27 blocks in each habitat area.

ODCW said that crappie, sunfish and bass are especially attracted to these structures. The new habitats have been installed at the north end of the Bluestem Dam spillway.
