= Oklahoma Department of Wildlife Conservation =

American Wildlife Conservation Agency

- Patch of the Oklahoma State Game Wardens
- Abbreviation: ODWC

Agency overview
- Formed: July 3, 1956
- Employees: 325 unclassified
- Annual budget: $40 million

Jurisdictional structure
- Operations jurisdiction: Oklahoma, USA
- Map of Oklahoma Department of Wildlife Conservation's jurisdiction
- Area: 69,898 square miles (181,030 km^{2})
- Population: 3,642,361 (2008 est.)
- General nature: Local civilian police

Operational structure
- Headquarters: 1801 N. Lincoln Blvd. Oklahoma City, Oklahoma
- Agency executive: Wade Free, Director
- Parent agency: Oklahoma Wildlife Conservation Commission

Website
- Department of Wildlife Conservation

The Oklahoma Department of Wildlife Conservation is an agency of the state of Oklahoma responsible for managing and protecting Oklahoma's wildlife population and their habitats. The department is under the control of the Wildlife Conservation Commission, an 8-member board appointed by the Governor of Oklahoma with the approval of the Oklahoma Senate. All members serve eight-year terms. The Commission, in turn, appoints a Director to serve as the chief administrative officer of the department.

The current Director of the Department of Wildlife Conservation is Wade Free.

The department was created in 1956 during the term of Governor Raymond D. Gary by an amendment to the Oklahoma Constitution.

== History ==
The department in its current state was created in 1956 when the voters of Oklahoma approved State Question 374, which amended the Oklahoma Constitution by adding Article 26. The State Question was brought before the voters of the state through an initiative petition process.

Before the department's addition to the State's Constitution, its duties existed in some form or format with the occasional interruption since the first Game Warden was hired in 1909.

The establishment of a Commission under -and by which- the Game Wardens were to be appointed was established during the State's Tenth Legislative Session via Senate Bill No. 185.

== Organization ==
- Wildlife Conservation Commission
  - Director
    - CFO/Chief - Administration
      - Administration Division
        - Accounting Section
        - Federal Aid Section
        - Human Resources Section
        - Information Technology Section
        - Licensing Section
        - Legislative Liaison Section
        - Property Management Section
    - Assistant Director - Operations
      - Fisheries Division
      - Wildlife Division
      - Communication and Education Division (C&E)
      - Law Enforcement Division

== Staffing ==
The Wildlife Conservation Department, with an annual budget of over $40 million, is one of the larger employers of the State. For fiscal year 2010, the department was authorized 339 full-time employees.

Division	Number of Employees
Administration Division	30
Wildlife Services Division	89
Fisheries Services Division	82
Law Enforcement Division	118
Information and Education Office	20
Total	339

== Fallen officers ==
Since the establishment of the Oklahoma Department of Wildlife Conservation, three officers have died while on duty.

== See also ==
- List of Oklahoma Wildlife Management Areas (WMAs)
- List of Law Enforcement Agencies in Oklahoma
- List of State and Territorial Fish & Wildlife Management Agencies in the United States
