= Lucy Walker steamboat disaster =

1844 explosion on Ohio River

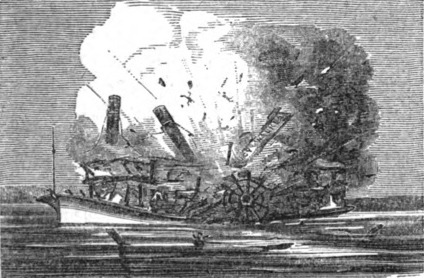
Lucy Walker explosion, as depicted in an 1856 woodcut.

The Lucy Walker steamboat disaster was an 1844 steamboat accident caused by the explosion of the boilers of the steamboat Lucy Walker near New Albany, Indiana, on the Ohio River. The vessel sank on the afternoon of Wednesday, October 23, 1844, after the steamer's three boilers exploded and set it afire, killing over 100. It was one of a number of similar accidents of early 19th-century riverine transportation that led to important federal legislation and safety regulations. The vessel's owner was a Native American; her crew were African-American slaves, and her passengers represented a cross-section of frontier travellers.

== Circumstances leading up to the disaster ==
The Lucy Walker was an average vessel of her time: 144 feet (44 m) long with a beam of 24 feet 6 inches (7.47 m) and a draft of 5 feet 6 inches (1.68 m). She displaced 183 tons. She was built at Cincinnati, Ohio, in 1843 and her home port was Webbers Falls on the Arkansas River in the Cherokee Nation in Indian Territory (now Oklahoma). The boat frequently steamed to both Louisville, Kentucky and New Orleans, Louisiana. She was a side-wheeler with three boilers, only one deck, no masts, no figurehead, and an above-deck cabin. Thomas F. Eckert, John Cochran, and Thomas J. Halderman had successively served as masters or captains of the Lucy Walker. Captain Halderman was an experienced river man, who since 1820 had worked as fireman, deck hand, engineer, and captain on steamboats, and later was a steamboat inspector. For some unknown reason, Halderman was replaced in Louisville just before departure, and her owner, Joseph Vann, took over the duties as captain.

Lucy Walker departed the Louisville wharf at noon on Wednesday, October 23, 1844, outbound for New Orleans. Some of the passengers were perhaps excited about the looming Presidential campaign in less than a fortnight between Whig and Kentucky native-son candidate Henry Clay and Democrat James K. Polk of Tennessee, while other passengers had likely participated in the pre-Churchill Downs horse racing season at Louisville. Aboard at the last minute was a Presbyterian church delegation. Lucy Walker probably avoided the rapids known as the "Falls of the Ohio" by traversing the new Louisville Falls Canal. She then crossed to the northern bank and picked up additional passengers at New Albany, a major river port. It has been asserted that Rezin Jameson, one of the pilots during the Robert E. Lee's famous race in 1870 with the Natchez, had also been a pilot on the Lucy Walker in 1844. However, Jameson's name does not appear in any of the New Albany or Louisville newspaper accounts of the explosion.

== Explosion and fire ==
About 5:00 on the afternoon of Wednesday, October 23, 1844, the vessel's engines stopped and she drifted mid-river about 4 to 5 miles (6.4 to 8.0 km) below New Albany while some repairs were made. Suddenly, the three boilers exploded in a mighty blast, propelling shards of metal and pieces of human flesh. One man shot 50 feet (15 m) in the air, to fall as a missile, piercing the boat's deck. Another was sliced in half by a piece of a boiler wall. The vessel then caught fire and quickly sank in 12 feet (3.7 m) of the Ohio River. Soon the water was filled with bodies of passengers and crew of the unfortunate Lucy Walker, both living and dead. A number of them were mangled or burned and survived only by rescue efforts of Captain L.B. Dunham and the crew of the nearby snagboat Gopher, which had been removing underwater obstacles under contract to the U.S. Army Topographical Engineers.

Loss of steamboats by collision, fire, or river obstacles (snags) was well understood, but boiler explosions seemed arbitrary and mysterious. Immediately after the loss of the Lucy Walker, multiple newspapers began to speculate on the cause or causes of the explosion. One paper opined that a faulty force pump and low water level in the boiler was the cause. Another newspaper reported qualms about reckless behavior of the boat's officers or shoddy construction of the boilers. Later there was speculation that steamboat racing might have contributed to the disaster.

The demise of the Lucy Walker was not the worst steamboat disaster in American history (see the Sultana), but it was among the most deadly. It is possible that more than 100 people died that day. Multiple steamboats sank because of boiler explosions, like the Lucy Walker explosion, but others like the Lady Elgin (sunk in a collision on Lake Michigan), had different causes.

== Legislation and regulation ==
The high death toll of steamboat disasters like the Lucy Walker sparked public concern, litigation, and Congressional debates about insurance issues, compensation of victims, responsibilities of vessel owners and masters, and need for state or federal legislation. There were ad hoc local and Congressional investigations of individual steamboat disasters, especially those involving boiler explosions. The general public was concerned that steamboat racing contributed to these disasters, but steamboat captains and passengers were thrilled by the excitement and gambling accompanying the contests.

Much of the problem was ignorance by steamboat operators. In those early days, the physics and mechanics of boiler explosions were not well understood. Designers did not know the tensile, compressive, or shear strengths of metals. Engineers did not know the effects of scaling, mud, etc., on feedwater pumps. Safety valves could be overloaded, and there were few pressure gauges. Too low water levels in boilers led to overheated boiler walls. Sometimes owners were simply too frugal or greedy to pay for good equipment or competent employees.

In addition, steamboat safety was an important aspect of the larger conflict between partisans of Andrew Jackson's states-rights vision of America as a federation of strong state governments and Henry Clay's "Internal Improvements Program" by a strong central government. An inadequate 1838 law was greatly strengthened by the Act of 1852, which included hydrostatic testing of boilers, the establishment of maximum pressures allowed, and inspection of boiler plate at the point of manufacture. In addition, engineers were subject to testing and licenses. Subsequent legislation led to the establishment of the Steamboat Inspection Service and eventually a real reduction in fatal episodes. Among the first government sponsorship for pure scientific research was a grant to the Franklin Institute of Philadelphia for the study of causes of boiler explosions. The investigation of steamboat fatal accidents like the Lucy Walker in the early 19th century was paralleled by similar actions taken after fatal crashes of airships and aircraft in the first half of the 20th century, which resulted in the establishment of the Federal Aeronautics Administration.

== Victims ==
Among the dead were General James West Pegram, a lawyer and banker, whose sons (General John Pegram and Colonel William Pegram) would become important Confederate officers in the Civil War. Pegram was also an important leader in the Whig party. Special Postal Agent Samuel Mansfield Brown of Lexington, Kentucky, was also identified as a victim. Brown had been one of the protagonists in a famous frontier brawl at Russell Cave, Kentucky, with Cassius Marcellus Clay, a Louisville newspaperman, emancipationist, and distant cousin of Henry Clay. When he learned of Brown's demise, Cassius Clay noted that Sam Brown was the bravest of all of the persons Clay had fought during a combative career.

Only two children and none of the women died, probably because their cabin was farther from the blast than the hurricane deck where most of the male passengers were gathered. Newspapers did not name Vann's slave crewmen. Thirty-six passengers and twenty crew members were identified as killed in the explosion, and forty-eight passengers and seven crew members who survived, with a total of 111 persons aboard. The pilot, Captain Thompson, estimated that there were at least 130 travellers, including deck passengers, and a thirty-man crew when the Lucy Walker left Louisville. Since the vessel's passenger manifests and crew lists were lost, there is no way to know precisely how many died.

== The owner, his horse, and his steamboat ==
The official government certificate issued for the Lucy Walker contains a statement under oath in which Joseph Vann swore that he was a U.S. citizen from Arkansas [Vessel Docs., Bu MI&N]. This statement was false; he was a citizen of the Cherokee Nation from Indian Territory (once part of Arkansas). Joseph Vann was mixed with Scottish, and the white family he was descended from were U.S. citizens. But the U.S. government did not allow dual citizenship at that time. However, he was certainly more than entitled to U.S. citizenship. Vann was famous for the great wealth inherited from his father, James Vann, including a mansion (Chief Vann House) and was known as "Rich Joe" Vann (to distinguish himself from a cousin also named Joseph ("Tenulte") Vann, who was the Assistant Principal Chief of the Western Cherokees) [McFadden].

"Rich Joe" Vann was the owner of a prize-winning race horse named "Lucy Walker", which he likely purchased in 1839 from an advertisement in the (Little Rock) Arkansas Gazette for sale at Memphis, Tennessee: "Lucy Walker, 3 years old, by Bertrand, dam Jane Little, now in training" [(1)June 12, 1839]. The filly was a frequent winner in quarter mile races, and produced a number of colts that Vann sold for as much as $5000 each [Wright]. When he purchased a steamboat at Cincinnati, Ohio, in 1843, Vann named his new vessel after Lucy Walker.

In February 1843, Vann advertised his new possession: "The new fast running steamer, Lucy Walker; Eckert, Master; Little Rock to New Orleans, sheet metal roof; two fire engines and hose" [(1)February 7, 1843]. Among the first passengers of the new Lucy Walker in March 1843 had been 200 Seminole Indians transported from New Orleans to Fort Gibson, Indian Territory, under charter to the U.S. Army [(1)March 16, 1843]. The Indians had been captured in Florida by the Army as part of federal efforts to remove southern Indian tribes to Indian Territory. Five years earlier, other commercial steamboats had been used by the Army to transport Vann's fellow Cherokees to the West as part of their own Trail of Tears.

== Slave crew ==
In 1835, Vann owned 110 African-American slaves at his home "Diamond Hill" (see the Chief Vann House) at Spring Place, Georgia. During the looming Cherokee Removal crisis, Vann was driven from his home by armed gangs of Georgians, and shifted his families and property for a time to the Cherokee town of Ooltewah, Tennessee, where he built a race track. In 1837, he again moved his business operations to Webber's Falls on the Arkansas River in Indian Territory. There he constructed a replica of "Diamond Hill", which was later destroyed by Union troops in the Civil War.

By 1842, "Rich Joe" Vann owned several hundred slaves at Webber's Falls, who worked on his plantation, took care of his horses, operated his steam ferryboat, or served as crew for his steamboat Lucy Walker. On November 15 of that year, some twenty-five slaves belonging to Vann, Lewis Ross (brother of Principal Chief John Ross), and other wealthy Cherokees at Webber's Falls locked their owners in their homes, and began a futile flight for freedom, heading for Mexico. The fugitives were joined by slaves owned by Creek Indians, but were quickly recaptured by a Cherokee posse. Vann took his black rebels to crew the Lucy Walker to separate their bad influence from the other slaves at Webber's Falls. One of the participants in the "Big Runaway" was a slave known as Kalet or Caleb Vann. In 1937, his daughter, Mrs. Betty Robinson, told an interviewer of the Works Progress Administration: "I was born close to Webbers Falls...in the same year that my pappy was blown up and killed in the big boat accident that killed my old Master." [McDonald; Baker, WPA]

The WPA also interviewed another former slave, Lucinda Vann, who told a story about Jim Vann, an engineer or fireman aboard the steamboat who was forced by Captain Vann at gunpoint to toss slabs of meat into the boiler since the fat was supposed to superheat the boiler water and thus increase steam pressure. Vann had been drinking, and was engaged in a race to New Orleans with a steamboat that had left Louisville with the Lucy Walker [Baker, WPA]. It is known from sailing notices in a Louisville newspaper that the steamboat Minerva was scheduled to depart for New Orleans at the same time as Lucy Walker. According to Lucinda Vann's account, Jim Vann threw in the meat into the firebox, and then leaped overboard just before the boilers exploded [Baker, WPA]. Essentially the same story was also told by Robert P. Vann, grandson of "Rich Joe." R.P. Vann talked with, but did not name the Negro fireman, who was supposed to be the only survivor of the explosion. Also killed in the explosion was 20-year-old Preston Mackey, uncle of Robert P. Vann and son-in-law of "Rich Joe". Lucinda Vann recounted that an arm of Preston Mackey was recovered (recognized by the design of his shirt sleeve) and placed in an alcohol-filled container and sent to Webber's Falls. There a doctor would occasionally display poor Mackey's appendage for the curious (including Lucinda Vann).

== Aftermath ==
Albert C. Koch was a German-born geologist who happened to be in Louisville the day following the explosion. He was told that 106 persons died, with a number of them badly injured or burned. He reported that searchers had found shattered body parts of victims on both Indiana and Kentucky banks of the Ohio, including a severed head identified as that of Captain Vann, but the fate of this portion of "Rich Joe" is now unknown.

The destruction of the Lucy Walker is well documented, but nearly every source contains some contradictions, garbled names, or incomplete information. Eyewitnesses included Captain Dunham of the snagboat Gopher, an anonymous gentleman from Baltimore, the pilot Capt. Thompson, and a group of ministers and laymen aboard the Lucy Walker. The latter told about their misadventures during and after the explosion, but somehow failed to notice or mention that the owner of the vessel was an American Indian, that drinking and gambling was present, or that the boat was engaged in a race with another boat. Most of the newspaper accounts also failed to note this aspect of the accident. The owner of the ship was identified in most newspapers as Captain David Vann, possibly confusing him with a cousin of that name who had served as the Treasurer of the Cherokee Nation. This David Vann was a brother of Joseph ("Tenulte") Vann. Various sources provide estimates of fatalities widely ranging from 18 to more than 100 deaths. Albert Koch misheard the name of the vessel as "Louise Walker." Even the date of the accident has frequently been listed in error in multiple reference works, which have the date as October 22 or 25, 1844. Only the Cherokee sources note the role that "Rich Joe" Vann played in the sudden end of the Lucy Walker and his own demise.

== Sources ==
- Baker, T. Lindsay; Baker, Julie P., eds. (1996). WPA Oklahoma Slave Narratives. Norman, OK: University of Oklahoma Press.
- Brockmann, R. John (2002). Exploding Steamboats, Senate Debates, and Technical Reports: The Convergence of Technology, Politics, and Rhetoric in the Steamboat Bill of 1838. Amityville, NY: Baywood Press.
- Bureau of Marine Inspection and Navigation. Record Group 41: Vessel Enrollment Certificates. Washington, DC: National Archives and Records Administration (NARA).
- Burton, Art T. (1996). Cherokee Slave Revolt of 1842. Trotwood, OH: LWF Communications.
- Clay, Cassius M. (1886). The Life of Cassius Marcellus Clay: Memoirs, Writings, and Speeches. Cincinnati, OH: Fletcher Brennn.
- Cummings, Samuel (1845). The Western Pilot. Cincinnati, OH.
- Dawley, Dave. Riverboat Dave's Paddlewheel Website.
- Debow, J.D.B. (September 1866). "Steamboat Explosions in the West". De Bow's Review. Vol. II, no. 3. pp. 308–309.
- Grimstead, David (2003). American Mobbing, 1828–1861: Toward Civil War. Oxford University Press.
- Halliburton, R. Jr. (1977). Red Over Black; Black Slavery Among the Cherokee Indians. Westport, CT. ISBN 9780837190341.
- Hitchcock, Eathan Allen (1930). Grant Foreman (ed.). A Traveler in Indian Territory. Cedar Rapids, IA.
- Hudddleston, Duane (January 1973). "Of Race Horses and Steamboats". The Independence County (Ark) Chronicle. XIV (2).
- Hunter, Louis C. (1993) [1949]. Steamboats on the Western Rivers: An Economic and Technological History (Corrected ed.). New York: Dover Publications. ISBN 0-486-27863-8.
- Jakle, John A. (1977). Images of the Ohio Valley, A Historical Geography of Travel, 1740 to 1860. New York, NY: Oxford University Press. ISBN 9780195022407.
- Koch, Albert C. (1972). Journey Through a Part of the United States of North America in the Years 1844–1845. Carbondale, IL: Southern University Press.
- Lloyd, James T. (1856). Lloyd's Steamboat Directory and Disasters on the Western Waters. New York: Jamest T. Lloyd.
- McDonald, Herman (2003). Vann Slaves Remember. Murray County (GA) Museum.
- McFadden, Marguerite. The Devil's Racetrack; A History of the Webber's Falls Area. Tulsa, OK.: Gilcrease Institution.
- McFadden, Marguerite (Spring 1983). "The Saga of 'Rich Joe' Vann". Chronicles of Oklahoma. 61.
- Moore, W. H. (1844). "Wreck of the Lucy Walker,1844: or The Great Steamboat Disaster". Evangical Guardian. II (1950 reprint ed.). Rossville, OH.
- Munsey, Frank A (1906). "How the Lucy Walker Was Blown to Pieces". The Scrapbook. I. New York.
- Paskoff, Paul F. (2007). Troubled Waters: Steamboat Disasters, River Improvements, and American Public Policy 1821–1860. Baton Rouge, LA: Louisiana State University Press.
- Pennsylvania versus The Wheeling and Belmont Bridge Company...Testimony and Report of R. H. Walworh to the U.S. Supreme Court. Saratoga Springs, NY: George White Printers. 1851.
- Perdue, Theda (1979). Slavery and the Evolution of Cherokee Society, 1540–1966. Knoxville, TN: University of Tennessee Press.
- Quick, Herbert; Quick, Edward (1926). Mississippi Steamboatin: History of Steamboating on the Mississippi and Its Tributaries. Henry Holt.
- Sandukos, Gregory P. (2002). Gently Down the Stream: How Exploding Steamboat Boilers in the 19th Century Ignited Federal Public Welfare Regulation. Harvard Law School Paper.
- Simmons, Samuel William (1985). The Pegrams of Virginia and Descendants, 1688–1984. Atlanta, GA.
- Tilghman, Zoe A (January 29, 1961). "The Voyage of Joe Vann". Daily Oklahoman Orbit.
- Vann, R.P. (June 1933). as told to Grant Foreman (ed.). "Reminiscences of Mr. R.P.Vann, East of Webbers Falls, Oklahoma, September 28, 1932". Chronicles of Oklahoma. 11 (2).
- Wright, Muriel H. (March 1930). "Early Navigation and Commerce Among the Arkansas and Red Rivers in Oklahoma". Chronicles of Oklahoma. 8 (1).
