= Federal Road (Cherokee lands) =

Old road in Georgia and Tennessee, USA

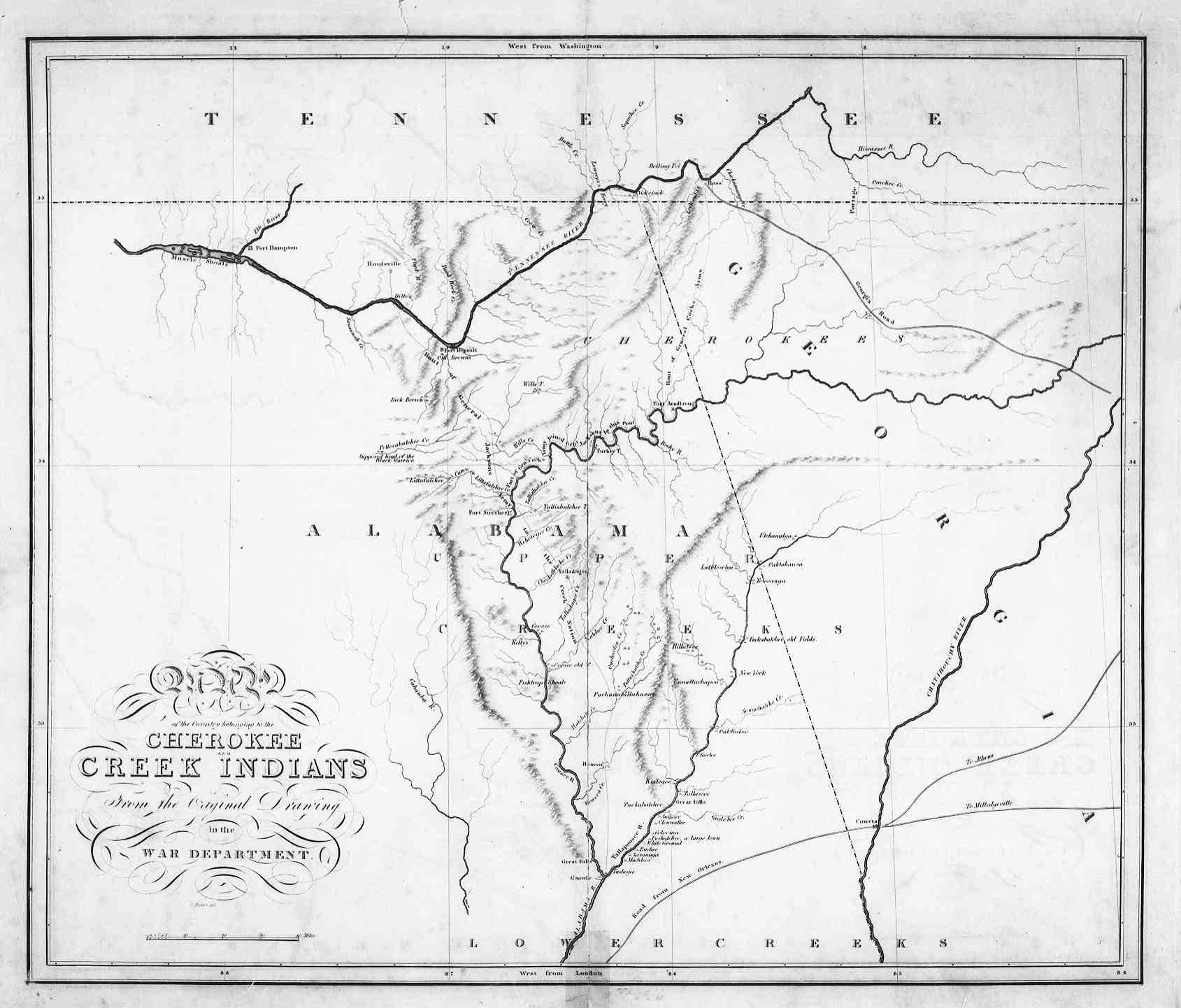

Route information
- Existed: 1805–1840s

Location
- Country: United States

Highway system

The Federal Road through Cherokee lands, originally called the Georgia Road, was a federal toll highway passing through the Cherokee Nation in the northern part of the U.S. state of Georgia. From 1805 to the 1840s, the road linked Savannah, Georgia with Knoxville, Tennessee. The road also opened Cherokee lands to settlement. Another Federal Road (Creek lands) passed through southern Alabama.

== Geography ==
The Federal Road ran from the location of modern-day Ringgold to Athens, Georgia, passing southeast through the Cherokee Nation and the modern day Georgia counties of Walker, Catoosa, Whitfield, Murray, Gilmer, Pickens, Dawson, Forsyth, Hall, Jackson, and Clarke counties.

== History ==
The Georgia Road was built from 1803 to 1805 through the newly formed Cherokee Nation on a land concession secured with the 1805 Treaty of Tellico. The Georgia Road opened in 1805. In 1819 the road was improved and called 'the Federal Road' but no federal funds were used in its creation.

As white travelers passed on the road, some settled near the road. They built homes and farms encroaching on Cherokee territory. In 1830, Georgia took the remaining Cherokee territory and distributed it to settlers in 1832.

The Federal Road continued to serve as a major transport route into the 1840s, but parts of the road fell into disuse as newer roads were opened.

=== Historic sites ===
- Chief Vann House Historic Site
- New Echota, site of the former Cherokee Nation capital

== See also ==
- James Vann
- Trail of Tears
- Trading Path
- Interstate 3
