= 1842 Slave Revolt in the Cherokee Nation =

Escape of enslaved people to Mexico

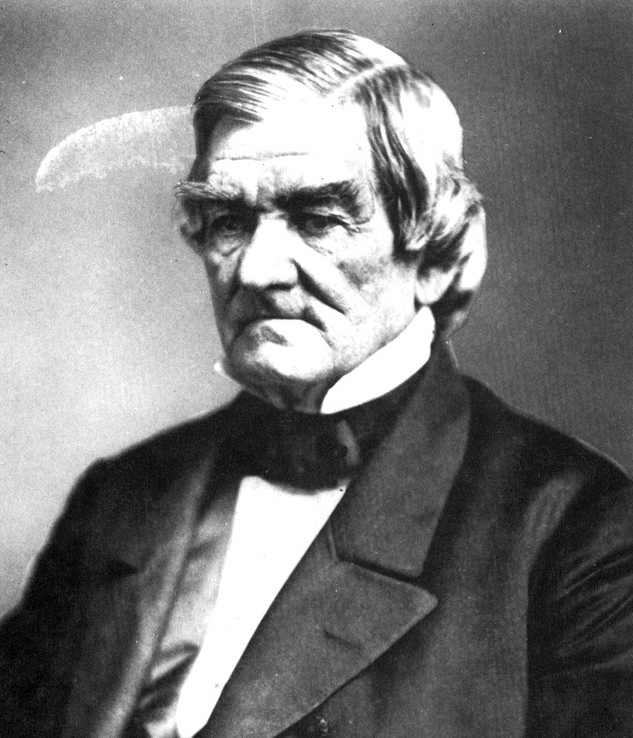
John Ross, a principal chief of the Cherokee and slave owner

The 1842 Slave Revolt in the Cherokee Nation was the largest escape of a group of slaves to occur in the Cherokee Nation, in what was then Indian Territory (present-day Oklahoma). The slave revolt started on November 15, 1842, when a group of 20 African Americans enslaved by the Cherokee escaped and tried to reach Mexico, where slavery had been abolished in 1829. Along their way south, they were joined by 15 slaves escaping from the Creek Nation in Indian Territory.

Later during their move, the fugitives ran into two slave catchers seizing a family of eight slave captives back to the Choctaw Nation. The fugitives killed the captors and allowed the family to join their party.

In response to this revolt, Cherokee officials put together reinforcements by creating a large armed force of over 100 Cherokee and Choctaw men to pursue and capture the fugitives. Prior to this, during the start of the slaves' expedition, an Indian party had already captured and killed some of the slaves. Five slaves were later executed for killing the two slave catchers.

What has been described as "the most spectacular act of rebellion against slavery" among the Cherokee, the 1842 event inspired subsequent slave rebellions in the Indian Territory. But, in the aftermath of this escape, the Cherokee Nation passed stricter slave codes, expelled freedmen from the territory, and established a 'rescue' (slave-catching) company to try to prevent additional losses.

== Background ==
Prior to European contact, the Cherokee had a practice of enslaving prisoners of war from other Indian tribes. These Prisoners were taken captive and once most had been tortured the rest were adopted into families and became part of the tribe. In the late 18th century, some Cherokee set up European-American style plantations on their Cherokee Nation land, which occupied territory near parts of Georgia and Tennessee. They originally captured runaway slaves but soon realized they could buy and trade African-American slaves to work this land. The African American slaves were never allowed to be adopted into the tribe and were seen purely as property. In 1819, the Cherokee Nation passed slave codes that regulated slave trade; forbade intermarriage; enumerated punishment for runaway slaves; and prohibited slaves from owning private property. An 1820 law regulated trading with slaves, requiring that anyone who traded with a slave without the master's permission was bound to the legal owner for the property, or its value, if the traded property proved to be stolen. Another code declared that a fine of fifteen dollars was to be levied for masters who allowed slaves to buy or sell liquor. The punishment for the slaves was usually whipping.

The Cherokee brought many of their slaves with them to the West in the Indian Removal of the 1820s and 1830s, when the federal government forcibly removed them from the Southeastern states. Joseph Vann was described as taking 200 slaves with him. Black slaves in each of the tribes performed much of the physical labor involved in the removal. For example, they loaded wagons, cleared the roads, and led the teams of livestock along the way.

The Cherokee adopted the practice of using enslaved African Americans on their plantations from European Americans. Most Cherokee held fewer slaves and labored with them at subsistence agriculture. Slaves worked primarily as agricultural laborers, cultivating both cotton for their master's profit and food for consumption. Some slaves were skilled laborers, such as seamstresses and blacksmiths. Like other slaveholders, affluent Cherokee used slaves as a portable labor force. They developed robust farms, salt mines, and trading posts created with slave labor.

By 1835, the time of removal, the Cherokee owned an estimated total of 1500 slaves of African ancestry (the most black slaves of any of the Five Civilized Tribes). Within five years of removal, 300 mixed-race Cherokee families, most descendants of European traders and Cherokee women for generations, made up an elite class in the Indian Territory. Most owned 25–50 slaves each. Some of their plantations had 600 to 1,000 acres; cultivating wheat, cotton, corn, hemp, and tobacco. Most of the men also had large cattle and horse herds.

By 1860, the Cherokee held an estimated 4,600 slaves, and depended on them as farm laborers and domestic servants. At the time of the Civil War, a total of more than 8,000 slaves were held in all of the Indian Territory, where they comprised 14 percent of the population.

== Events of the revolt ==
The mass escape of 20 enslaved African Americans from the Cherokee territory began on November 15, 1842, and has been called "the most spectacular act of rebellion against slavery" among the Cherokee. Most of the 20 slaves were from the plantations of "Rich Joe" Vann and his father James; they gathered and raided local stores for weapons, ammunition, horses, and mules. Escaping from Webbers Falls without casualties, the slaves headed south for Mexico, where slavery had been prohibited since 1836. Along the way they picked up another 15 slaves escaping from Creek territory. Some Cherokee and Creek pursued the fugitives, but the slaves partially held them off. In one altercation, 14 slaves were either killed or captured, but the remaining 21 continued south. The Cherokee and Creek pursuers returned to their nations for reinforcements.

Along the way, the fugitives encountered two slave catchers, James Edwards, a white man, and Billy Wilson, a Lenape (Delaware Indian), who were returning to Choctaw territory with an escaped slave family of three adults and five children. The family had been headed west into Plains Indian territory. The fugitive party killed the bounty hunters to free the slave family. Together they continued South, slowed somewhat by traveling with five children.

On November 17, the Cherokee National Council in Tahlequah passed a resolution authorizing Cherokee Militia Captain John Drew to raise a company of 100 citizens to "pursue, arrest, and deliver the African Slaves to Fort Gibson." (The resolution also relieved the government of the Cherokee Nation of any liability if the slaves resisted arrest and had to be killed.) The commander at Fort Gibson loaned Drew 25 pounds of gunpowder for the militia.

The large force caught up with the slaves seven miles north of the Red River on November 28. The tired fugitives, weak from hunger, offered no resistance. They were forced to return to their owners in the Choctaw, Creek and Cherokee reservations. The Cherokee later executed five slaves for the murders of Edwards and Wilson. Vann put most of his surviving slaves to work on his steamboats, shoveling coal.

The slave revolt inspired future slave rebellions in the Indian Territory. By 1851, a total of nearly 300 blacks had tried to escape from Indian Territory. Most headed for Mexico or the area of the future Kansas Territory, where residents prohibited slavery.

== Economic impact ==
Indian slaveholders bought and sold slaves, often doing business with white slaveholders in the neighboring states of Texas and Arkansas. The owners in both areas always considered enslaved Africans to be property.

After the revolt, the Cherokee often hired non-slave holding Indians to catch runaway slaves. In the past, some of these people had struggled to eat, while slave-owning families flourished in a market economy driven by slave labor. Some among these once poor Cherokee became wealthy by providing services to the 'rescue' company in catching fugitive slaves. When slave catching expeditions were mounted, such trackers were paid. They were also authorized to buy ammunition and supplies for the hunt, at the expense of the Nation (provided that the expedition was not "unnecessarily protracted and did not incur needless expenses"). This was the economic impact of the Revolt.

== Outcome ==
The Cherokee Nation sent the Cherokee Militia to catch runaway slaves in November 1842. When they returned to Tahlequah on December 8, 1842, five slaves were executed, and Joseph Vann put most of his rebellious slaves to work on steamboats.

The slave revolt had threatened the security of enslaved labor force and plantation owners' profits. The National Council passed a stricter slave code and required expulsion of free blacks from the territory, thinking they might encourage resistance among the enslaved population. On December 2, soon after the revolt came to an end, the Cherokee National Council passed "An Act in regard to Free Negroes," directing sheriffs to advise all free blacks, excluding those already freed by the Cherokee, to leave the Cherokee Nation by January 1, 1843; refusal resulted in being sent to the agent of expulsion. Additionally, the act made those who freed their slaves responsible for the actions of the ones they freed. Any free black who tried to assist slaves in escaping their plantation would be punished with 100 lashes on their bare back and be expelled from the nation. After the American Civil War, planters and the upper class of the Cherokee Nation shifted from expansive plantation agriculture to small-scale manufacturing of products, which were sold internally, instead of being exported.

As a mass escape that resulted in casualties and deaths of both slaves and others, the 1842 slave revolt was widely reported by newspapers. Even 50 years later, when the Fort Smith Elevator of Arkansas published an anniversary article about the escape, the account had a kind of mythic power. It recounted a morning when Cherokee slaveholders could not find their slaves and said that "hundreds" had disappeared overnight, rather than the 20 of fact.

== See also ==
- African American diaspora
- Atlantic slave trade
- Mascogos
- Cherokee Freedmen
