= David Vann (Cherokee leader) =

Cherokee leader (1800–1863)

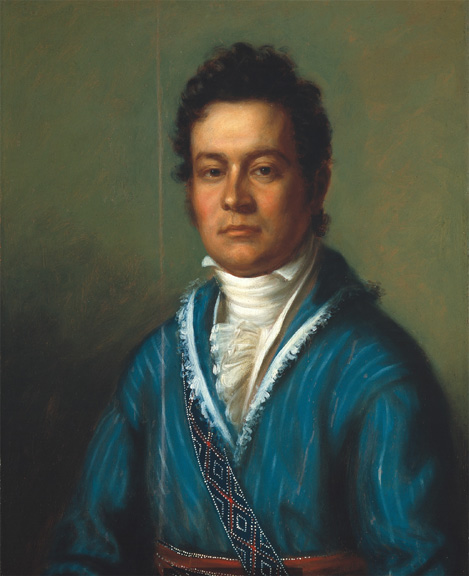
- David Vann, by Charles Bird King, 1825

Cherokee Nation leader

Personal details
- Born: January 1, 1800 Georgia
- Died: December 23, 1863 (aged 63)
- Cause of death: Killed in battle, Civil War
- Spouses: Jennie Chambers; Martha McNair
- Relations: James Vann (uncle); Joseph Vann (cousin); Will Rogers (great-nephew)
- Children: 9
- Parent(s): Avery Vann & Margaret McSwain

David Vann (Georgia, January 1, 1800 – December 23, 1863) was a sub-chief of the Cherokee people. He was a skilled negotiator with the United States government on behalf of the Cherokee and Creek peoples. Vann was elected treasurer of the Cherokee Nation in 1839, 1843, 1847 and 1851.

== Early life and family ==
David Vann was the second son of Avery Vann and wife Margaret [née McSwain] Vann. He was the brother of Joseph "Teaultlo" Vann and Sallie [nee Vann] Rogers, the grandmother of Will Rogers. He was the nephew of the Cherokee chief James Vann; and the first cousin of Cherokee leader and businessman, Joseph Vann.

== Negotiator ==
=== Work with the Creeks ===
In the fall of 1825, the Creeks decided they needed experienced negotiators to present their case against expulsion from their lands in the Southeast. They turned to the Cherokees for assistance. Major Ridge recommended that the Creeks retain David Vann and John Ridge, both well educated and fluent in English, to help them prepare for the meeting with General Edmund Pendleton Gaines.

They prepared a speech for the Creek chief, Opothleyahola, to be made at the Gaines meeting. The speech won the support of General Gaines, but the Creek delegation insisted on meeting directly with Gaines' superiors in Washington, D. C. Since none of the Creeks were fluent in English, they wanted to include Ridge and Vann in their delegation. Gaines told them that President Adams would not negotiate Creek affairs with Cherokee. As a compromise, the two men were included, each carrying the title of secretary, rather than negotiator. After the agreements were concluded, Ridge and Vann had their portraits painted by noted artist Charles Bird King.

=== Work with the Cherokees ===
Vann was a member of the Cherokee Treaty Party, a political entity that supported negotiation with the United States for the voluntary emigration of the Cherokee people to the West, in order to secure their rights. Its leaders signed the Treaty of New Echota in 1835, leading to the Cherokee removal in 1838-1839. Elijah Hicks, son of Chief William Hicks and editor of the Cherokee Phoenix, presented a petition to the National Council calling for the impeachment of the Ridges and David Vann. The council members did not vote to proceed with impeachment, but the charges were not withdrawn. Politically, this left the status of Vann and the Ridges in limbo.

After the Cherokees removed to Indian Territory, David Vann became assistant principal chief of the Cherokee Nation.

== Personal life and death ==
David Vann and his first wife, Jennie Chambers, had two children. He and his second wife, Martha McNair, had seven children. Vann's daughter, Mary Delilah Vann, married Joel B. Mayes (later Principal Chief of the Cherokee Nation) in 1869.

During the American Civil War, Vann was killed by 'Pin Indians' (Cherokees who supported the Union) in 1863.

== Legacy ==
Vanns Branch in Alabama is named after him.

== See also ==
- Timeline of Cherokee removal

== Sources ==
- Langguth, A. J. Driven West: Andrew Jackson and the Trail of Tears to the Civil War. New York, Simon & Schuster. 2010. ISBN 978-1-4165-4859-1.
