= McClendon Curtis =

American football player (born 1999)

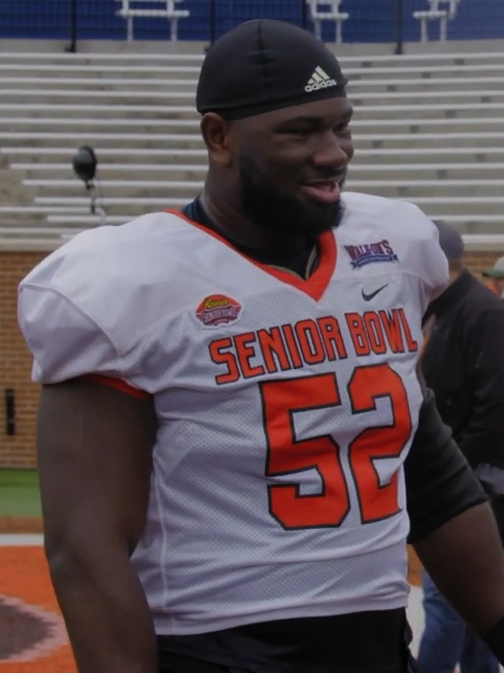
- Curtis at the 2023 Senior Bowl

Profile
- Position: Offensive guard

Personal information
- Born: September 16, 1999 (age 27); Harrison, Tennessee, U.S.
- Listed height: 6 ft 6 in (1.98 m)
- Listed weight: 330 lb (150 kg)

Career information
- High school: Chattanooga Central (Harrison)
- College: Chattanooga (2017–2022)
- NFL draft: 2023: undrafted

Career history
- Las Vegas Raiders (2023)*; Seattle Seahawks (2023–2024); Arizona Cardinals (2025)*; New York Giants (2025)*; Las Vegas Raiders (2025)*
- * Offseason or practice squad member only

Awards and highlights
- FCS All-American (2022); SoCon Jacobs Blocking Trophy (2022); 3× First-team All-SoCon (2020–2022)

Career NFL statistics as of 2024
- Games played: 5
- Stats at Pro Football Reference

McClendon Jerrell Curtis (born September 16, 1999) is an American professional football offensive guard. He played college football for the Chattanooga Mocs.

== Early life ==
Curtis grew up in Chattanooga, Tennessee and attended Chattanooga Central High School, where he played football and basketball. He was rated a two-star recruit and committed to play college football at University of Tennessee at Chattanooga over UT Martin and offers from Football Bowl Subdivision programs Appalachian State, Georgia Southern, MTSU, Ohio, Temple, and Western Kentucky.

== College career ==
Curtis redshirted his true freshman season at Chattanooga. He became the Mocs' starting right guard going into his redshirt sophomore year and start all 12 of the team's games. Curtis was named first team All-Southern Conference (SoCon) as a redshirt junior. He repeated as a first team All-SoCon selection as a redshirt senior after starting all of the Mocs' games at guard. Curtis decided to utilize the extra year of eligibility granted to college athletes who played in the 2020 season due to the coronavirus pandemic and return to Chattanooga for a sixth season. He moved to offensive tackle during spring practices tackle. Curtis won the Jacobs Blocking Award as the best blocker in the SoCon in his final season. After the conclusion of his college career, he played in the 2023 Senior Bowl.

== Professional career ==
Pre-draft measurables
Height	Weight	Arm length	Hand span	40-yard dash	10-yard split	20-yard split	20-yard shuttle	Three-cone drill	Vertical jump	Broad jump	Bench press
6 ft 5 7/8 in (1.98 m)	324 lb (147 kg)	35 in (0.89 m)	10 1/4 in (0.26 m)	5.24 s	1.85 s	3.06 s	4.97 s	7.70 s	26.5 in (0.67 m)	8 ft 9 in (2.67 m)	25 reps
All values from the NFL Combine

=== Las Vegas Raiders ===
Curtis was signed by the Las Vegas Raiders as an undrafted free agent on May 12, 2023. He was waived on August 29, and re-signed to the practice squad.

=== Seattle Seahawks ===
On September 13, 2023, Curtis was signed by the Seattle Seahawks off the Raiders practice squad.

Curtis was waived by the Seahawks on August 27, 2024, and re-signed to the practice squad. He was promoted to the active roster on September 21. He was waived on October 10, and re-signed to the practice squad.

=== Arizona Cardinals ===
On January 13, 2025, Curtis signed a reserve/future contract with the Arizona Cardinals. He was waived on August 25.

=== New York Giants ===
On August 29, 2025, Curtis was signed to the New York Giants' practice squad. He was released by the Giants on September 8.

=== Las Vegas Raiders (second stint) ===
On October 14, 2025, Curtis signed with the Las Vegas Raiders' practice squad. He was released on October 21, then re-signed on December 17. Curtis signed a reserve/future contract with Las Vegas on January 5, 2026. He was waived by the Raiders on May 2.
