= Webbers Falls Lake =

- Location within Oklahoma Location within the United States
- Location: Oklahoma
- Coordinates: 35°36′N 95°15′W
- Type: Reservoir, Lock
- Primary inflows: Arkansas River
- Primary outflows: Arkansas River
- Catchment area: 97,033 mi^{2} (251,310 km^{2})
- Basin countries: United States
- Managing agency: U.S. Army Corps of Engineers
- Built: January 1965
- First flooded: December 1970
- Surface area: 11,600 acres (4,700 ha)
- Average depth: 15 ft (4.6 m)
- Max. depth: 54 ft (16 m)
- Water volume: 170,106 acre⋅ft (0.209823 km^{3})
- Shore length^{1}: 157 mi (253 km)
- Surface elevation: 490 ft (150 m)
- Settlements: Webbers Falls, Oklahoma
- ^{1} Shore length is not a well-defined measure.

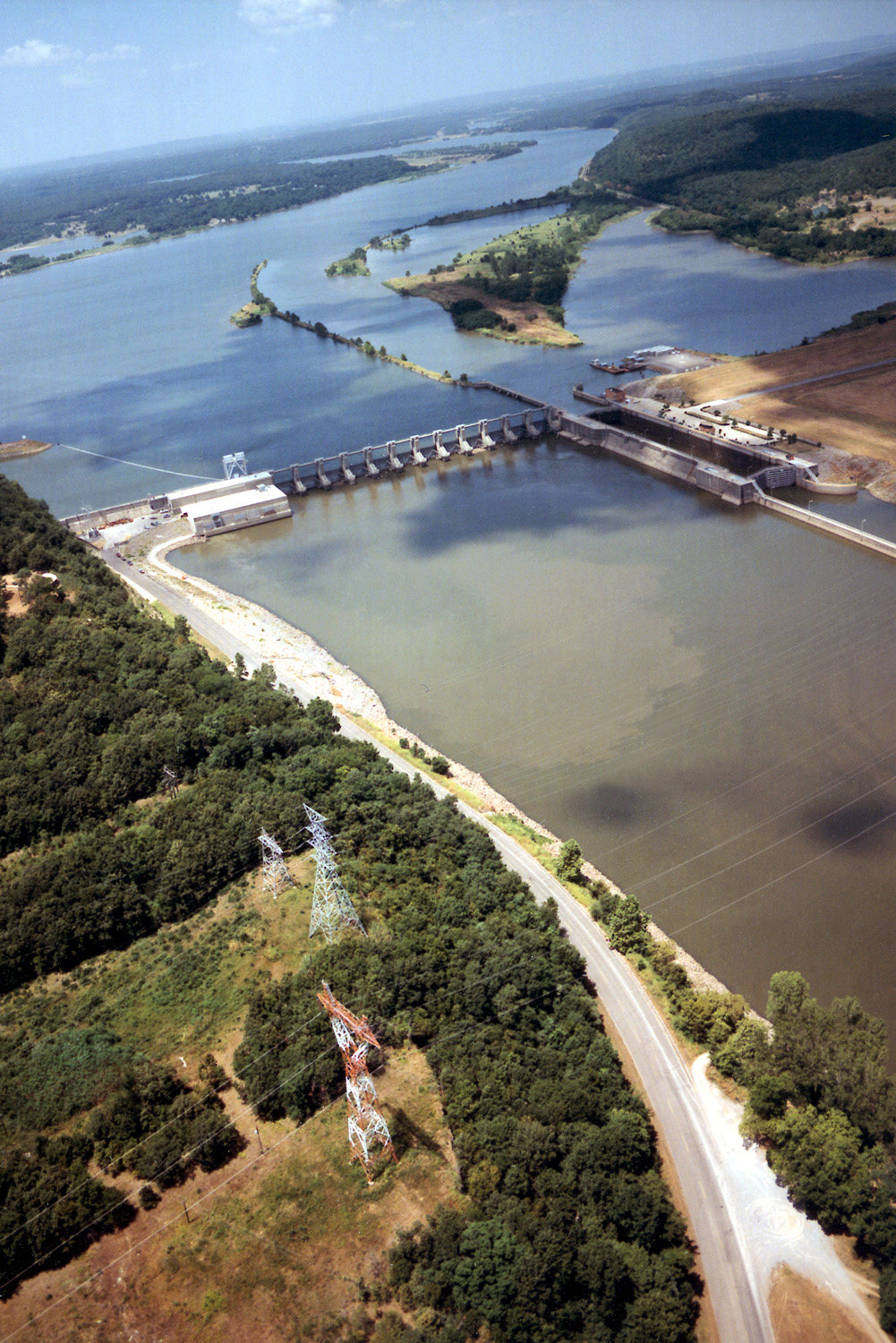
Webbers Falls Lock and Dam on the Arkansas River March 3, 1999

Webbers Falls Lake, also known as Webbers Falls Reservoir, is a reservoir created by a lock and dam on the Arkansas River in Muskogee County, Oklahoma. The normal elevation is 490 feet (150 m). It has 157 miles (253 km) of shoreline and a surface area of 11,600 acres (47,000,000 m^{2}). The drainage area of the lake is 97,033 square miles (251,310 km^{2}). It is an integral part (Lock and Dam No. 16) of the McClellan-Kerr Arkansas River Navigation System, which was completed in 1971.

The lock and dam are about 3 miles (4.8 km) from the town of Webbers Falls, Oklahoma. There is an observation platform and visitor facility at the lock and dam, where visitors can view the operation of the locks during passage of river craft.

The project was authorized by Congress in the River and Harbor Act July 4, 1946, and amended by the Flood Control Acts of 1948 and 1950. Construction began in January 1965 and became operational for navigation in December 1970.

== See also ==
- Arkansas River
- McClellan-Kerr Arkansas River Navigation System
- 2019 Arkansas River floods
