= Bill Ortwein =

American attorney and politician (1940–2019)

William Hubert Ortwein (July 21, 1940 – January 26, 2019) was an American attorney and politician who served as a member of the Tennessee Senate for the 10th district between 1977 and 1985. Ortwein was a Democrat.

== Background ==
Ortwein was born in Chattanooga, Tennessee, the only son of Hubert and Freda Ortwein and went to the public schools, graduating from Chattanooga Central High School in 1958. At age 17 he enlisted in the United States Marine Corps. Upon completion of training at Parris Island, he was transferred to Twentynine Palms for advanced combat training. Ortwein was assigned as a forward observer for artillery (the "snipers with the biggest guns"). After serving eight years, and achieving the rank of Corporal, Ortwein was honorably discharged. While in the Marine Corps Reserves Ortwein attended the University of Tennessee. After three years, without yet receiving his degree, he was accepted and successfully completed law school at the same university. Upon graduation he returned to Chattanooga where he began practicing law, which he continued to do for the next four decades. After a short time with the District Attorney's Office and other small private firms, he started his own firm focusing on criminal defense. He was involved in a number of high-profile trials, and was a respected member of the legal community.
