= Dicksie Bradley Bandy =

American entrepreneur and historian

- Born: August 11, 1890; Bartow County, Georgia, U.S.
- Died: November 5, 1971 (aged 81)
- Education: Reinhart Normal College; Georgia State College for Women
- Spouse: Burl Jackson Bandy (m. 1915; died 1948)
- Children: Christine; Jack; Dicksie Jr.

Dicksie Bradley Bandy (August 11, 1890 – November 5, 1971) was an American entrepreneur and historian.

== Early life and education ==
Bandy was born on August 11, 1890, in Bartow County; her father Dick was a country doctor.

She attended Reinhart Normal College in Waleska, and Georgia State College for Women in Milledgeville. In 1915, she married Burl Jackson "B. J." Bandy, who worked for Southern Railway.

== Career ==
While her husband served during World War I, Bandy worked as a telegraph operator. After the war, the Bandy family ran a country store in Sugar Valley, which was successful until the Great Depression. After the store closed, the Bandys had to look elsewhere for income.

By this time, the Dalton area was already well known for its large grassroots chenille bedspread industry, and the Bandys began hand-tufting bedspreads. Since her husband B. J. had worked for the railroad, Bandy had a free rail pass, so she traveled to Washington, D.C. with samples of their bedspreads. There, Woodward & Lothrop purchased 400 spreads at $4.00/unit, which the Bandys produced for $2.00; Bandy traveled onward to Baltimore, where Hochschild Kohn's ordered 200 units. Her next trip to New York City resulted in Macy's ordering 1,000 bedspreads. By the end of the 1930s, the Bandys were reportedly the first people to ever earn $1 million in the bedspread industry. The family opened factories in Cartersville, Dalton, Ellijay, and Rome; the Cartersville location eventually would become the largest tufted textile mill in the country under the auspice of Bartow Textiles. Other companies that have origins in the Bandy family include Universal Carpets, Coronet Industries, and Southern Craft Company.

== Philanthropic efforts ==
Following the family's success, Bandy turned her attention to charitable causes, giving to Hamilton Memorial Hospital, the Dalton Salvation Army, and the Dalton Regional Library System. In the 1950s, she spearheaded the effort to restore and preserve the Chief Vann House, during which time she founded the Whitfield-Murray Historical Society. Ivan Allen Jr. was also involved with the Vann House effort. Bandy organized the opening ceremony on July 27, 1958. The Cherokee Nation named Bandy an official ambassador thanks to her work.

== Personal life and death ==
Bandy and her husband B. J. had three children: Christine, Jack, and Dicksie Jr. B. J. died in 1948.

Bandy died on November 5, 1971 at the age of 81. She was added to the Georgia Women of Achievement in 1993.
