= Harrison Bay State Park =

State park in Tennessee, United States

Coordinates: 35°10′35″N 85°7′7″W

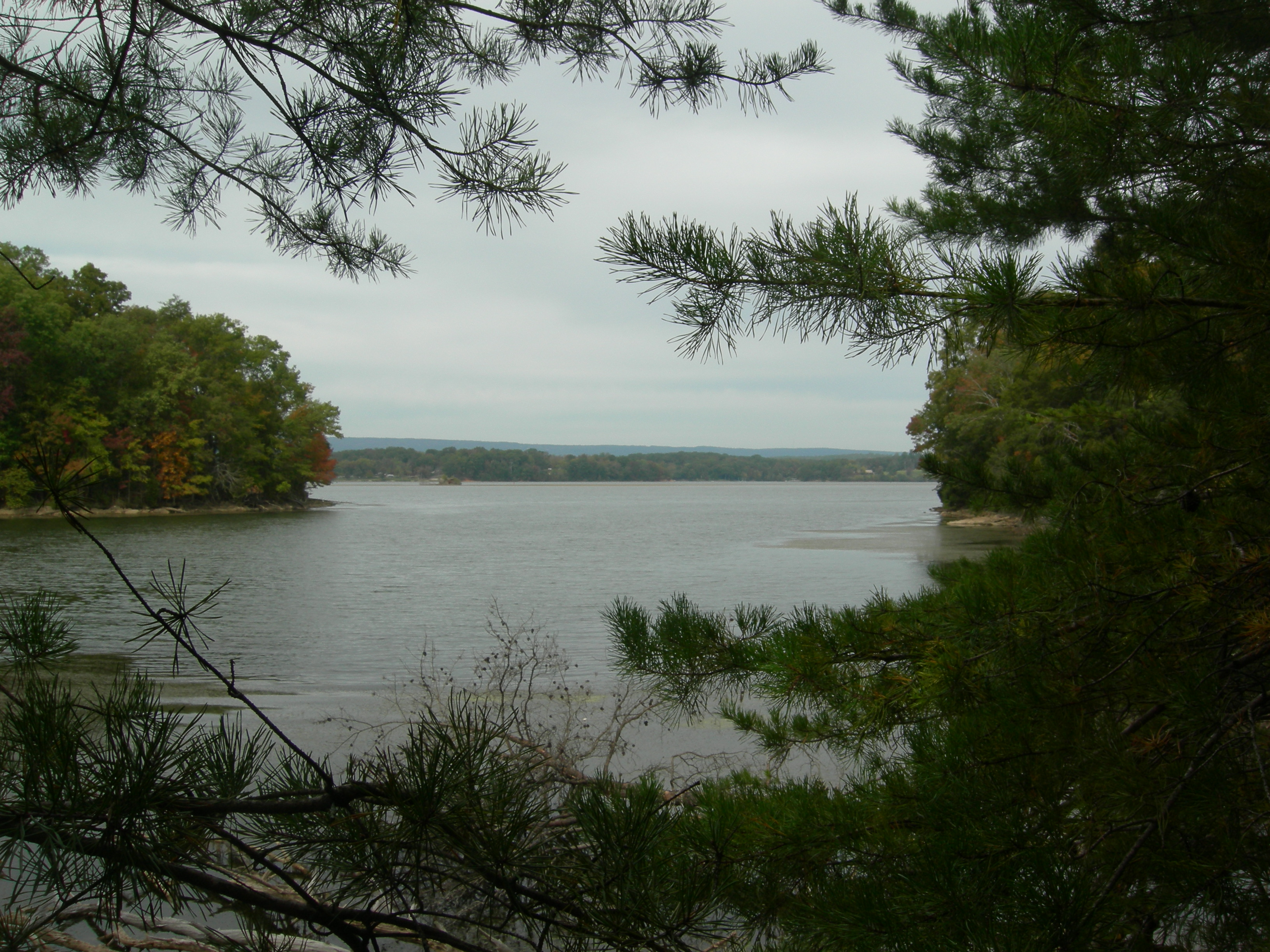
- Harrison Bay State Park, October 2011
- Interactive map of Harrison Bay State Park
- Type: Tennessee State Park
- Location: Harrison, Tennessee
- Area: 1,200 acres (4.9 km^{2})
- Elevation: 628–700 ft (191–213 m)
- Created: 1930s
- Opened: 1937
- Operator: Tennessee Department of Environment and Conservation
- Open: Year-round, dawn until dusk (Marina open March–October)
- Website: Harrison Bay State Park

Harrison Bay State Park is a 1,200-acre (4.9 km^{2}) state demonstration park developed by the Tennessee Valley Authority in the 1930s along the shores of Chickamauga Lake. Opened in 1937, the bay gets it name from the now partially submerged town of Harrison, Tennessee. It was built at the same time as Booker T. Washington State Park.

The park has a 4.2-mile (6.8-km) hiking path around the lake and has facilities including a playground, a golf course, tennis courts, a restaurant, a campground, and a marina.
