= Chattanooga Central High School =

Public school in Tennessee, United States

Location
- 5728 Highway 58; Harrison, Tennessee 37341; United States; 35°06′34″N 85°08′07″W

Information
- Type: Public high school
- Opened: September 1907
- School district: Hamilton County Schools
- Principal: LeAngela Rogers
- Teaching staff: 44.66 (FTE)
- Enrollment: 670 (2023-2024)
- Student to teacher ratio: 15.00
- Colors: Purple and gold
- Team name: Purple Pounders
- Website: chs.hcde.org

Chattanooga Central High School is a public high school in Harrison, Tennessee, operated by the Hamilton County Board of Education.

Central High School opened in September 1907 on Dodds Avenue in Chattanooga. It was one of Chattanooga's first public high schools. Its students came from all over the Hamilton County area and the school was highly acclaimed. In 1969, the high school was relocated to Highway 58 in Harrison.

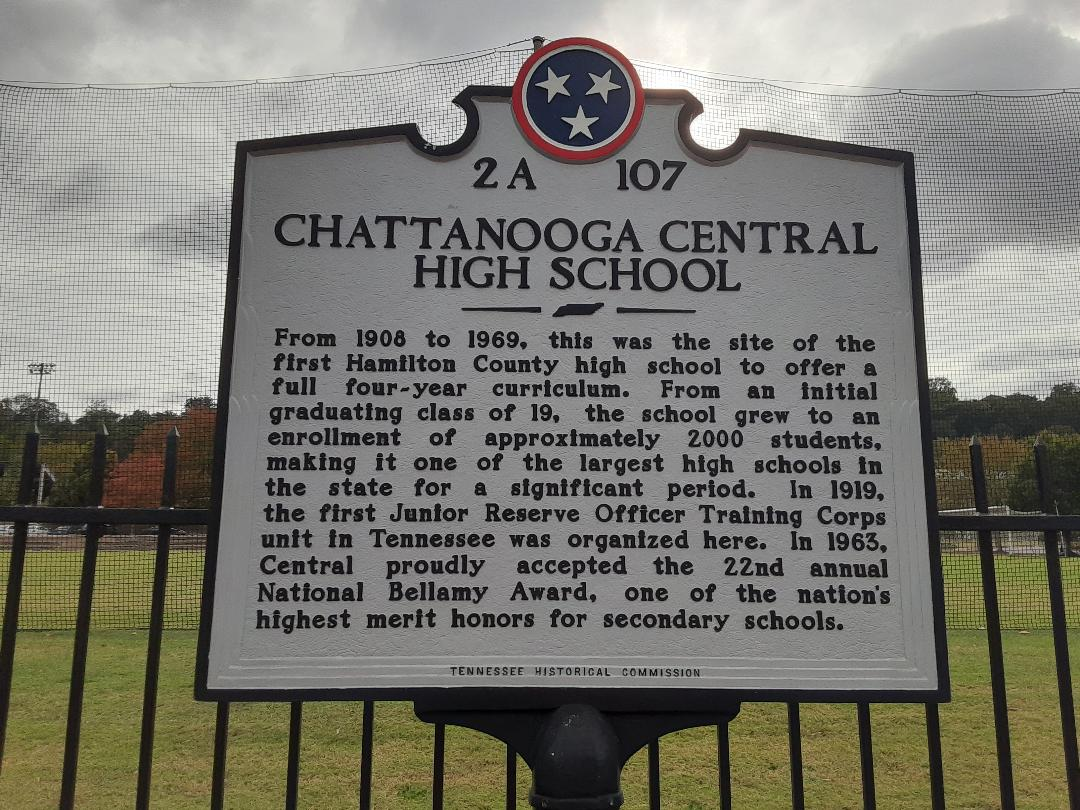
Former site of Chattanooga Central High School

The school athletics teams originally went by the name Purple Warriors as the school colors are purple and gold. During an exceptionally good year in the 1930s a local sportswriter began to opine that they often "pounded" their opponents; the name stuck. The "Purple Pounders" is the current name, often illustrated with a hammer and anvil.

From 2008 until 2018, Finley King served as the school's principal. He was the second Central High alum to serve as principal. Following King's departure, Phil Iannarone, former principal of nearby Snow Hill Elementary School, served as principal from 2018 to 2024. Since 2024, LeAngela Rogers has been the incumbent principal.

In early September 2019, an unidentified school administrator ordered washroom mirrors painted over because students were spending too much time checking their appearance. The decision was reversed after a Facebook post about it went viral.

== Notable alumni ==
- Vonn Bell, professional football player (attended)
- David Copeland, 1948, Tennessee state representative
- McClendon Curtis, professional football player
- Damon Duval, 1998, professional football player
- Gibby Gilbert, 1959, professional golfer
- Bobby Hoppe, 1954, football player
- Todd Nance, 1981, drummer, Widespread Panic
- Bill Ortwein, 1958, Tennessee state senator
- S. Dean Petersen, mayor of Chattanooga, Tennessee
- Paul Starnes, 1952, Tennessee state representative
- Robert Kirk Walker, mayor of Chattanooga, Tennessee
- Bobby Wood, 1953, Tennessee state representative
