= Bobby Lee Cook =

American defense attorney (1927–2021)

- Born: February 12, 1927; Lyerly, Georgia, U.S.
- Died: February 19, 2021 (aged 94); Cloudland, Georgia, U.S.
- Education: Vanderbilt University Law School
- Occupation: Defense attorney

Bobby Lee Cook (February 12, 1927 – February 19, 2021) was an American defense attorney from Summerville, Georgia. He practiced law from 1949 until shortly before his death. He represented a wide variety of clients, from rural Southerners to international businessmen and corporations. He was reputed to have been the inspiration for the television series Matlock main character Ben Matlock, which starred Andy Griffith as a Georgia attorney.

== Early life and education ==
Cook was born in 1927 in Lyerly, Georgia. He attended Vanderbilt University Law School in Nashville, Tennessee. He practiced law in Summerville with the Cook & Connelly law firm.

== Career ==
Cook worked as a defense attorney for over 70 years. In 2016, he reflected on his early career in segregated Georgia, when African Americans were "required to sit in the balcony of old courtrooms". He described it as "a most unusual, extraordinary time. It was a time when no women sat on juries, and certainly no blacks".

In 2009, the ABA Journal estimated that Cook had an 80 percent career acquittal rate in murder trials.

== Significant cases ==
- Represented Wayne Williams, who appealed against his 1982 conviction for the murder of two black youths in what was known as the Atlanta Child Murders.
- Represented Troy L. Griffith Jr., star running back for Trion High School, Trion, Georgia.
- 1986—Defended Tennessee banker C.H. Butcher Jr., who faced 25 counts of fraud. Butcher was acquitted on all counts.
- 1988—Represented former Auburn University All-American football star Bobby Hoppe, who was charged with murder in a 1957 shooting. Jurors deadlocked 10-2 for acquittal. The case was never retried.
- 1989—Defended Jim Williams during the first of four trials for the 1981 shooting death of Danny Hansford. The case was the inspiration for the book Midnight in the Garden of Good and Evil by John Berendt, published in 1994. Williams was convicted of the murder and sentenced to life in prison, although appealed, posting a $200,000 bond. Cook later received, anonymously, a copy of the police report showing the arresting officer contradicted himself, and the verdict was overturned. A new trial was ordered.

== Death ==
Cook died in 2021, aged 94.
