= Bobby Hoppe =

American football player (1934–2008)

No. 20
- Position: Halfback

Personal information
- Born: November 13, 1934; Chattanooga, Tennessee, U.S.
- Died: April 7, 2008 (aged 73); Chattanooga, Tennessee, U.S.
- Listed height: 5 ft 11 in (1.80 m)
- Listed weight: 175 lb (79 kg)

Career information
- High school: Chattanooga (TN) Central
- College: Auburn
- NFL draft: 1958: 3rd round, 33rd overall pick

Career history
- San Francisco 49ers (1958); Washington Redskins (1959)

Awards and highlights
- National champion (1957); All-American, All-Southern, All-State, Most Outstanding Player in Tennessee; All-SEC (Southeastern Conference)

Robert Hoppe (November 13, 1934 – April 7, 2008) was an American football halfback who played on the 1957 National Championship team at Auburn University.

== Early life ==
Hoppe attended and played high school football at Chattanooga Central High School, class of 1954, where he led his team to three state championships and two undefeated seasons. As halfback in Central's T formation he was dubbed the Chattanooga Choo Choo and Hippity Hoppe by local sports writers. Hoppe earned his nicknames as a prolific running back, gaining nearly 1,500 yards in his senior season and scoring 33 touchdowns during his junior and senior seasons. He was named the first high school All-American from Chattanooga, TN after his senior season.

== College career ==
Hoppe was one of the most highly recruited football players of his era with 19 colleges seeking his commitment, including Auburn, Alabama, Clemson, Georgia, North Carolina, Vanderbilt, Tennessee, Florida, Mississippi, South Carolina, Louisiana State, Miami, Rice, Indiana, SMU, and Texas Tech. He accepted a scholarship to play for Auburn under head football coach Shug Jordan.

After a high school career as a running back, Hoppe became known in the Southeastern Conference (SEC) both as a devastating blocking back from the right halfback position and as a hard hitting defensive back on the national championship team. He also continued to run the football and finished his Auburn career in 4th position on the all-time rushing list.

Hoppe played his senior season under a heavy personal cloud that did not come fully to light until 31 years later. Just prior to his senior season Hoppe allegedly shot and killed a Chattanooga bootlegger, Don Hudson. Hoppe was not indicted for the shooting until 1988.

== Professional career ==
Hoppe was drafted by the San Francisco 49ers in the third round, and traded to the Washington Redskins after one year. He was injured shortly after the trade. He made a short comeback with the Chattanooga Cherokees in 1965.

== After football ==
After leaving the Redskins, Hoppe returned to Auburn to complete his Bachelor of Science in Education degree which he received in 1961. While completing his degree, he served as an assistant coach for Jordan at Auburn. After earning his degree he coached football at several high schools in Georgia and Tennessee, including head football coaching jobs at Chattanooga Valley High School and Calhoun High School in Georgia. He earned his Master of Science in Educational Administration at the University of Tennessee at Chattanooga, and became athletic director at two Tennessee community colleges before retiring in 1999.

== Cold case ==
In 1988, thirty-one years after Don Hudson was killed, a Chattanooga grand jury indicted Bobby Hoppe for his murder, in one of America's first cold case trials. Hoppe's trial became a national media event that ended with a hung jury. Hoppe was defended by Bobby Lee Cook of Georgia – one of the most noted defense attorneys in the United States, whose clients included Jimmy Hoffa – along with Chattanooga attorney Leroy Phillips. Hoppe's wife, Sherry Lee Hoppe, wrote in 2010, "My husband Bobby shot a man, and he died. I wish it were not so, but it is. It happened in 1957, and Bobby hid the terrible truth for 31 years."
