= Harrison, Tennessee =

- CDP
- Location of Harrison, Tennessee
- Coordinates: 35°7′9″N 85°8′58″W
- Country: United States
- State: Tennessee
- County: Hamilton

Area
  - Total: 8.59 sq mi (22.25 km^{2})
  - Land: 6.74 sq mi (17.46 km^{2})
  - Water: 1.85 sq mi (4.78 km^{2})
- Elevation: 768 ft (234 m)

Population (2020)
  - Total: 7,902
  - Density: 1,172/sq mi (452.5/km^{2})
- Time zone: UTC-5 (Eastern (EST))
  - Summer (DST): UTC-4 (EDT)
- ZIP code: 37341
- Area code: 423
- FIPS code: 47-32600
- GNIS feature ID: 1286997

Harrison is a census-designated place (CDP) in Hamilton County, Tennessee, United States. The population was 7,902 at the 2020 census. It is part of the Chattanooga metropolitan area. Harrison Bay State Park, the Hamilton County Landfill, Bear Trace Golf Course, a course designed by Jack Nicklaus, and Skull Island, a recreational area owned by TVA, are all located in Harrison.

== Geography ==
Harrison is located at 35°7′9″N 85°8′58″W (35.119296, -85.149487).

According to the United States Census Bureau, the CDP has a total area of 9.0 square miles (23 km^{2}), of which, 7.1 square miles (18 km^{2}) of it is land and 1.8 square miles (4.7 km^{2}) of it (20.57%) is water.

== History ==
The town developed southeast of Vann's Ferry (Vann Town), a ferry crossing established by James Vann, a prominent Cherokee trader and planter. It was later named Harrison after President William Henry Harrison and became the seat of Hamilton County in 1840. The county seat was later moved to Chattanooga, Tennessee, after the Civil War. The first post office was opened on June 16, 1841. In 1870 the Hamilton County Courthouse was moved from Harrison to Chattanooga.

Harrison's borders were once larger than today. When the Chickamauga Dam was completed on the Tennessee River by the Tennessee Valley Authority in 1940, much of the city was flooded, as portrayed in the 1960 movie Wild River. Some parts of the old city, such as old building foundations, roads, and guard rails, can still be seen, especially in and around Harrison Bay, named for the submerged town. Harrison Bay State Park is a TVA-built park in the area now.

== Demographics ==
Historical population
Census	Pop.	Note	%±
2020	7,902		—
U.S. Decennial Census

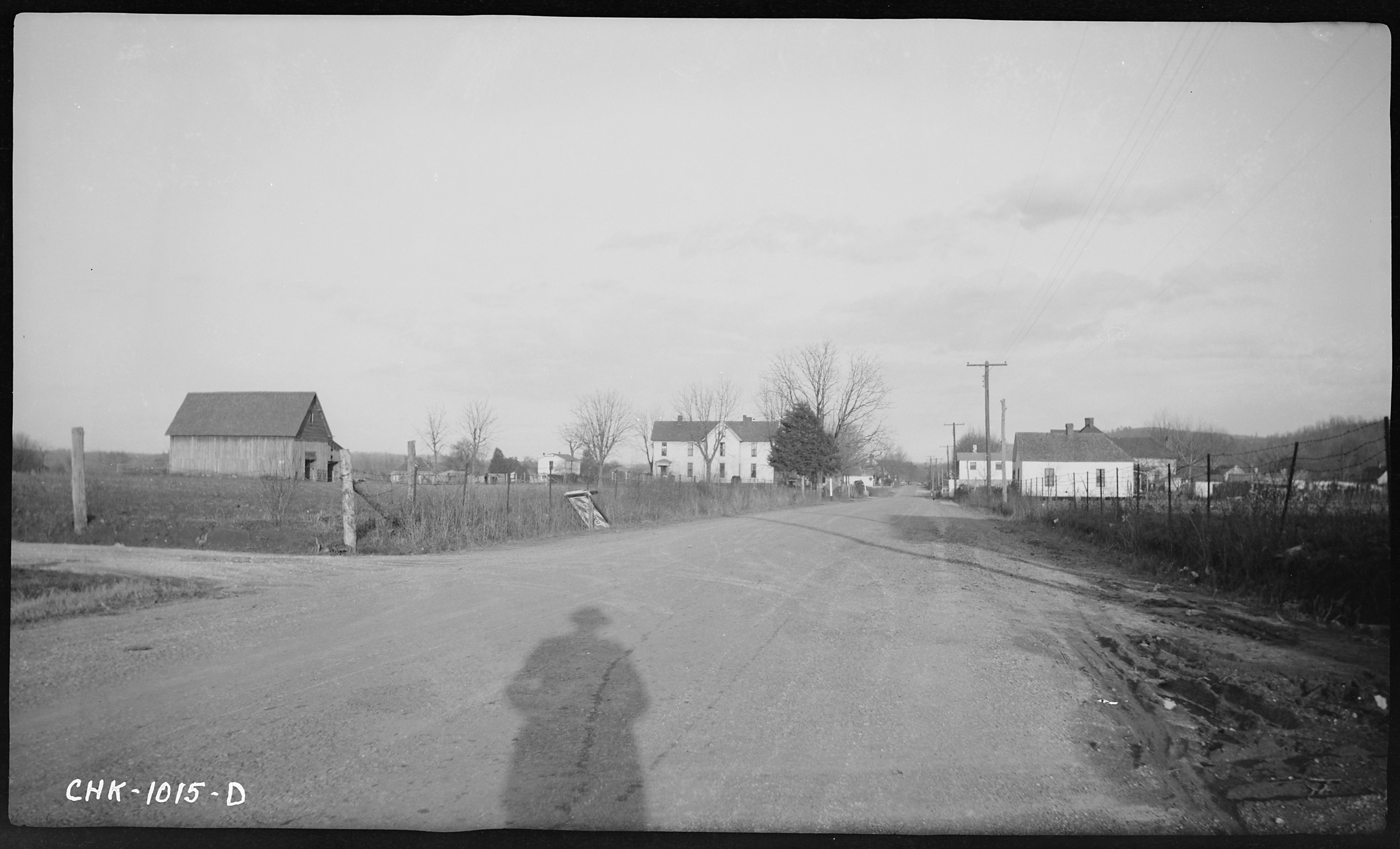
A street scene in Harrison in 1937.

=== 2020 census ===
Harrison racial composition
Race	Number	Percentage
White (non-Hispanic)	5,366	67.91%
Black or African American (non-Hispanic)	1,723	21.8%
Native American	15	0.19%
Asian	106	1.34%
Pacific Islander	3	0.04%
Other/Mixed	411	5.2%
Hispanic or Latino	278	3.52%

As of the 2020 United States census, there were 7,902 people, 3,132 households, and 2,321 families residing in the CDP.

=== 2000 census ===
As of the census of 2000, there were 7,630 people, 2,856 households, and 2,281 families residing in the CDP. The population density was 1,046.0 inhabitants per square mile (403.9/km^{2}). There were 2,956 housing units at an average density of 405.2 per square mile (156.4/km^{2}). The racial makeup of the CDP was 84.59% White, 12.94% African American, 0.35% Native American, 0.69% Asian, 0.01% Pacific Islander, 0.26% from other races, and 1.15% from two or more races. Hispanic or Latino of any race were 1.17% of the population.

There were 2,856 households, out of which 35.0% had children under the age of 18 living with them, 65.8% were married couples living together, 10.6% had a female householder with no husband present, and 20.1% were non-families. 16.6% of all households were made up of individuals, and 5.1% had someone living alone who was 65 years of age or older. The average household size was 2.67 and the average family size was 3.00.

In the CDP, the population was spread out, with 24.9% under the age of 18, 7.8% from 18 to 24, 29.9% from 25 to 44, 27.4% from 45 to 64, and 9.9% who were 65 years of age or older. The median age was 38 years. For every 100 females, there were 93.8 males. For every 100 females age 18 and over, there were 92.0 males.

The median income for a household in the CDP was $49,393, and the median income for a family was $55,412. Males had a median income of $35,332 versus $27,487 for females. The per capita income for the CDP was $22,893. About 1.7% of families and 3.1% of the population were below the poverty line, including 1.4% of those under age 18 and 6.7% of those age 65 or over.

== Parks and recreation ==
Harrison Bay State Park is located in Harrison. It is a 1200-acre park that was developed in the 1930s and covers part of the Chickamauga Lake shoreline. Other recreation located nearby are: Skull Island (Birchwood), Booker T. Washington State Park (Bartlebaugh) and an assortment of Civil War Parks and other tourist attractions in and around Chattanooga.

== Education ==
The Hamilton County Schools operates five schools in this area: Harrison Elementary School, Snow Hill Elementary School, Brown Middle School, Chattanooga Central High School, and Hamilton County High School.
