= Webbers Falls, Oklahoma =

- Town
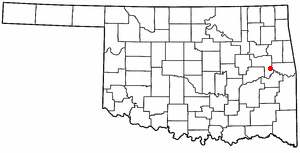
- Location in Oklahoma
- Coordinates: 35°30′39″N 95°07′48″W
- Country: United States
- State: Oklahoma
- County: Muskogee

Area
  - Total: 4.20 sq mi (10.87 km^{2})
  - Land: 4.19 sq mi (10.85 km^{2})
  - Water: 0.0077 sq mi (0.02 km^{2})
- Elevation: 482 ft (147 m)

Population (2020)
  - Total: 338
  - Density: 80.7/sq mi (31.14/km^{2})
- Time zone: UTC-6 (Central (CST))
  - Summer (DST): UTC-5 (CDT)
- ZIP Code: 74470
- Area codes: 539/918
- FIPS code: 40-79650
- GNIS feature ID: 2413461
- Website: webbersfallsok.com

Webbers Falls is a town in southeastern Muskogee County, Oklahoma, United States. The population was 338 at the 2020 census, down from 616 in 2010.

The name comes from a seven-foot waterfall in the Arkansas River (Note: The falls had been named La Cascade by French explorers during the early 18th century. They are now submerged in the Robert S. Kerr Reservoir, created by the construction of Robert S. Kerr Lock and Dam.) named in honor of Walter Webber, a Cherokee chief who established a trading post here in 1818. He was a leader among the Western Cherokee, also called "Old Settlers". They had a treaty with the United States government by 1828, which helped settle some conflicts with the Osage people, who had been forced to give up land to the Cherokee.

In the late 1830s and 1840, thousands of Cherokee from the Southeast were forcibly moved into Indian Territory as a result of the US policy of Indian Removal.

== History ==
Walter Webber had settled here with some of the first Cherokee to go to Indian Territory west of the Mississippi River; it was then considered part of Arkansas Territory. Having acquired a small fleet of keelboats, he was able to stock the post with goods from other parts of the United States, so he opened a trading post and a portage service, as well as building a house. Of mixed-race Cherokee-European descent, Webber was married to a full-blood Cherokee. They had adopted many American ways and outfitted their house in European-American style. When English-speaking visitors came, one of their African-American slaves and domestic servants would translate. Webber also built a salt works, leasing the land for it from the Cherokee government, which held it communally as a tribe. In the early years when Webber was in the territory, there was considerable conflict with the Osage people, who were forced by the United States government to give up some of their territory to the Cherokee, in a Treaty of 1828.

Webber was among the early leaders of the Cherokee in this area, one of their representatives when meeting with US agents and going to Washington for meetings. The Western Cherokee resisted sharing their territory with immigrants to be resettled from the Southeast, as the US government proposed in 1834. They finally agreed that year, in exchange for an increased amount of land and annuities.

In the late 1830s and 1840, the mass of thousands of Cherokee from the Southeast were forcibly moved into Indian Territory as a result of the US policy of Indian Removal. According to the Webbers Falls Historical Museum, this is the second-oldest town in the former Indian Territory.

Joseph Vann, a/k/a "Rich Joe" Vann, was among the thousands of Cherokee emigrants forced from Georgia during Indian Removal. He settled nearby and established a plantation, where he worked some of the more than 200 slaves he brought with him. At his direction, slaves built a house here that was a replica of his former antebellum mansion in Georgia, the Chief Vann House. This area was within the reservation of the Cherokee Nation.

A post office opened at Webbers Falls in 1856.

=== 1842 slave revolt ===
On November 15, 1842, more than 25 slaves revolted in the largest action and escape in Cherokee territory. Mostly from Joseph Vann's and his father's plantations, the slaves locked masters and overseers in houses and cabins, stole guns and ammunition, horses and mules, food, and other supplies, then started traveling south. Their goal was to reach Mexico, where they knew slavery had been abolished. They picked up about 10 slaves in Creek territory along the way, and later freed a family of eight slaves from two slavecatchers, killing the latter.

After the first pursuers returned for reinforcements, the Cherokee National Council ordered about 87 men of the Cherokee Militia, under Captain John Drew, to apprehend the fugitives. The militia caught up with the fleeing slaves north of the Red River on November 28. The militia returned the fugitives to Tahlequah on December 8. Five were executed for having killed two slavecatchers they encountered to free a fugitive slave family from the Choctaw reservation. Vann put his surviving slaves to work as laborers and coal stokers on his steamboats.

=== Civil War ===
Cherokee Confederate General Stand Watie established a headquarters at Webbers Falls during the Civil War. In 1863, Union troops tried to capture Watie, but failed. Before leaving, they burned the town, including Vann's antebellum home.

=== 20th century ===
In 1907, Brewer's Academy opened as the first school. It was named for Oliver Hazard Perry Brewer, a local politician who had served as the Cherokee Nation's Superintendent of Education in 1870 and 1876, and as the Board of Education President in 1881.

The town suffered a major fire that destroyed much of the business district in 1911. It was rebuilt in the following year, with the new structures mostly constructed of brick. These still stand.

The town got a rail line to Warner in 1911 courtesy of the Webbers Falls, Shawnee and Western Railroad. That railway, which connected to the Midland Valley Railroad at Warner, ceased operations in 1914, was reorganized as the Webbers Falls Railroad in 1916, but was dismantled by 1918.

Construction in 1970 of the Webbers Falls Lock and Dam created Webbers Falls Reservoir, and construction in the same year of Robert S. Kerr Lock and Dam created the Robert S. Kerr Reservoir, both part of the McClellan–Kerr Arkansas River Navigation System (MKARNS), operated by the U.S. Army Corps of Engineers. It has boosted the local economy by attracting outdoor enthusiasts for recreation opportunities. The town population increased 57 percent between 1980 and 2000, from 461 to 726. However, the population had declined significantly by 2010.

=== 21st century ===
The I-40 bridge disaster happened on May 26, 2002; a barge collided with a bridge support near Webbers Falls, causing a 580-foot (180 m) section of the I-40 bridge to plunge into the Robert S. Kerr Reservoir on the Arkansas River. Automobiles and semi-trucks fell into the water, killing 14 people (including a three-year-old girl) and two horses. The bridge was repaired within two months, and reopened to traffic on July 29, 2002.

On May 22, 2019, two barges loaded with fertilizer broke loose from Muskogee County and were heading to Webbers Falls Lake. They were part of a tow that had been docked along the river because of the extremely high water level and the speed of the current. On the morning of May 23, 2019, the barges got stuck on some rocks and were later secured but, at around 10:40 AM the barges were on the loose after a helicopter attempted to safely secure the barges and around noon that same day hit the dam, which caused minor damage to the structure, but destroyed flood gates 7, 8, and 9. The barges suffered major damage as they overturned and dumped their cargo into the flood, then sank to the base of the dam. Since the lake level had to be lowered significantly before the mangled barges could be removed, the flood gates could not be safely removed and the damaged gates repaired. This restricted traffic through the McClellan–Kerr Arkansas River Navigation System until late October 2019.

== Geography ==
Webbers Falls is in southeastern Muskogee County, 26 miles (42 km) southeast of Muskogee, the county seat, via the Muskogee Turnpike. U.S. Route 64 passes through the north side of town, leading northeast across the Arkansas River 1.5 miles (2.4 km) to Gore and west 10 miles (16 km) to Warner. Interstate 40 passes just south of the town, leading east 44 miles (71 km) to Fort Smith and west 137 miles (220 km) to Oklahoma City.

According to the U.S. Census Bureau, Webbers Falls has a total area of 4.2 square miles (10.9 km^{2}), of which 0.007 square miles (0.018 km^{2}), 0.17%, are water. The Arkansas River runs along the eastern border of the town.

== Demographics ==
Historical population
Census	Pop.	Note	%±
1900	211		—
1910	380		80.1%
1920	480		26.3%
1930	415		−13.5%
1940	486		17.1%
1950	489		0.6%
1960	441		−9.8%
1970	485		10.0%
1980	461		−4.9%
1990	722		56.6%
2000	726		0.6%
2010	616		−15.2%
2020	338		−45.1%
U.S. Decennial Census

=== 2020 census ===
As of the 2020 census, Webbers Falls had a population of 338. The median age was 45.0 years. 24.3% of residents were under the age of 18 and 26.3% of residents were 65 years of age or older. For every 100 females there were 106.1 males, and for every 100 females age 18 and over there were 98.4 males age 18 and over.

0.0% of residents lived in urban areas, while 100.0% lived in rural areas.

There were 136 households in Webbers Falls, of which 33.8% had children under the age of 18 living in them. Of all households, 53.7% were married-couple households, 21.3% were households with a male householder and no spouse or partner present, and 21.3% were households with a female householder and no spouse or partner present. About 23.5% of all households were made up of individuals and 13.2% had someone living alone who was 65 years of age or older.

There were 179 housing units, of which 24.0% were vacant. The homeowner vacancy rate was 0.0% and the rental vacancy rate was 26.1%.

Racial composition as of the 2020 census
Race	Number	Percent
White	225	66.6%
Black or African American	0	0.0%
American Indian and Alaska Native	80	23.7%
Asian	1	0.3%
Native Hawaiian and Other Pacific Islander	0	0.0%
Some other race	0	0.0%
Two or more races	32	9.5%
Hispanic or Latino (of any race)	5	1.5%

=== 2000 census ===
As of the census of 2000, there were 726 people, 288 households, and 209 families residing in the town. The population density was 186.6 inhabitants per square mile (72.0/km^{2}). There were 364 housing units at an average density of 93.6 per square mile (36.1/km^{2}). The racial makeup of the town was 69.56% White, 0.28% African American, 24.79% Native American, 1.38% from other races, and 3.99% from two or more races. Hispanic or Latino of any race were 2.48% of the population.

There were 288 households, out of which 33.0% had children under the age of 18 living with them, 53.5% were married couples living together, 15.3% had a female householder with no husband present, and 27.4% were non-families. 24.0% of all households were made up of individuals, and 10.1% had someone living alone who was 65 years of age or older. The average household size was 2.52 and the average family size was 2.89.

In the town, the population was spread out, with 28.2% under the age of 18, 9.0% from 18 to 24, 24.5% from 25 to 44, 21.9% from 45 to 64, and 16.4% who were 65 years of age or older. The median age was 37 years. For every 100 females, there were 86.6 males. For every 100 females age 18 and over, there were 86.1 males.

The median income for a household in the town was $19,300, and the median income for a family was $22,955. Males had a median income of $22,813 versus $17,031 for females. The per capita income for the town was $10,684. About 22.0% of families and 26.2% of the population were below the poverty line, including 40.9% of those under age 18 and 14.9% of those age 65 or over.

== Notable people ==
- Joseph "Rich Joe" Vann (1798-1844), early Cherokee settler and operator of a steamboat business, who died in 1844 when his steamboat, Lucy Walker, exploded on the Mississippi River.
- Stand Watie, Confederate general, retired here after the Civil War until his death in 1870.
