= Booker T. Washington State Park (Tennessee) =

State park in Tennessee, United States

Coordinates: 35°6′32″N 85°10′34″W

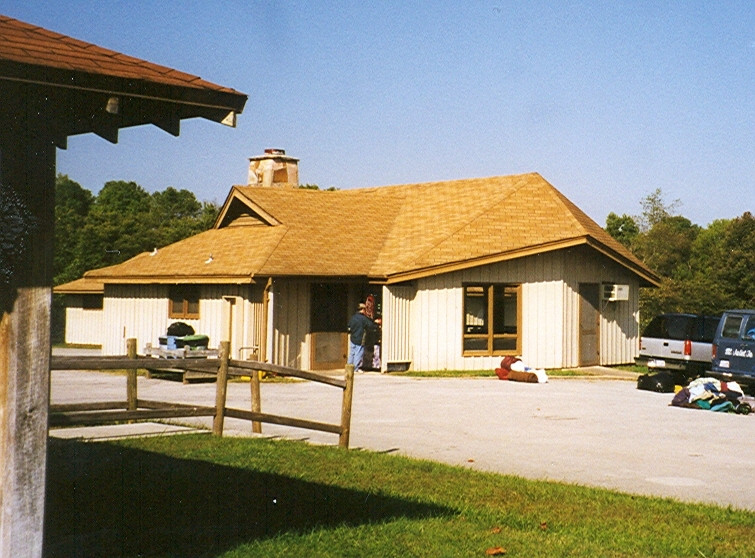
- Group Lodge at Booker T. Washington State Park
- Type: Tennessee State Park
- Location: Chattanooga, Tennessee
- Area: 353 acres (1.43 km^{2})
- Operated by: Tennessee Department of Environment and Conservation
- Open: Year round
- Website: Official website

Booker T. Washington State Park is a 353-acre (1.43 km^{2}) park situated on the shores of Chickamauga Lake. It was built largely by African-American units of the Civilian Conservation Corps. It was originally designated under segregation as one of two Tennessee State Parks for use by blacks (the other being T. O. Fuller State Park near Memphis) until discrimination in public accommodations in the United States was banned under the Civil Rights Act of 1964.

== Facilities ==
The park has facilities to accommodate all its visitors: three separate picnic shelters that can accommodate up to 60 people, 30 individual picnic sites equipped with grills and water spigots, one group lodge, two bath houses, one wash house, restrooms that are handicap accessible, two floating docks that accommodates several boats, a single lane boat ramp, fishing pier with two shelters at the ends, olympic size swimming pool that is open from memorial day weekend to labor day weekend, three different mountain biking trails, and a basketball court.

== Recreation ==
=== Biking ===
Booker T. Washington park is used in many ways by locals as it offers an array of outdoor activities with one being mountain biking. According to SORBA (Southern Off-road Biking Association), Booker T. Washington has three different biking trails to offer. The outer loop is the longest of the three at approximately 3.9 miles, with the first inner loop coming in at a distance of 1.2 miles and the second inner loop stretching out at 2.2 miles. It is also common to see more experienced riders ride all three which come to a total of approximately 7.3 miles. Booker T. Washington state park is popular with local riders because it offers intermediate riders three quality trails, though riders are advised not to ride the trails during wet conditions as they become unsafe.

=== Fishing ===
Another popular recreational activity in Booker T. state park is fishing, given its location alongside Chickamauga lake. According to the TWRA, or Tennessee Wildlife Resources Agency, Booker T. Washington state park is open to fishing year round with an array of fish species being available such as largemouth bass, smallmouth bass, spotted bass, striped bass, black crappie, white crappie, channel catfish, blue catfish, and flathead catfish. The TWRA has taken an interest in Booker T. Washington's fishing potential by creating fish attractors such as the main pier located at the main point of the park as well as the upkeep of shorelines to ensure easy access to the waterfront.

== See also ==
- List of things named after Booker T. Washington
