= Chief Vann House Historic Site =

Historic house in Georgia, United States

- Chief Vann House
- U.S. National Register of Historic Places
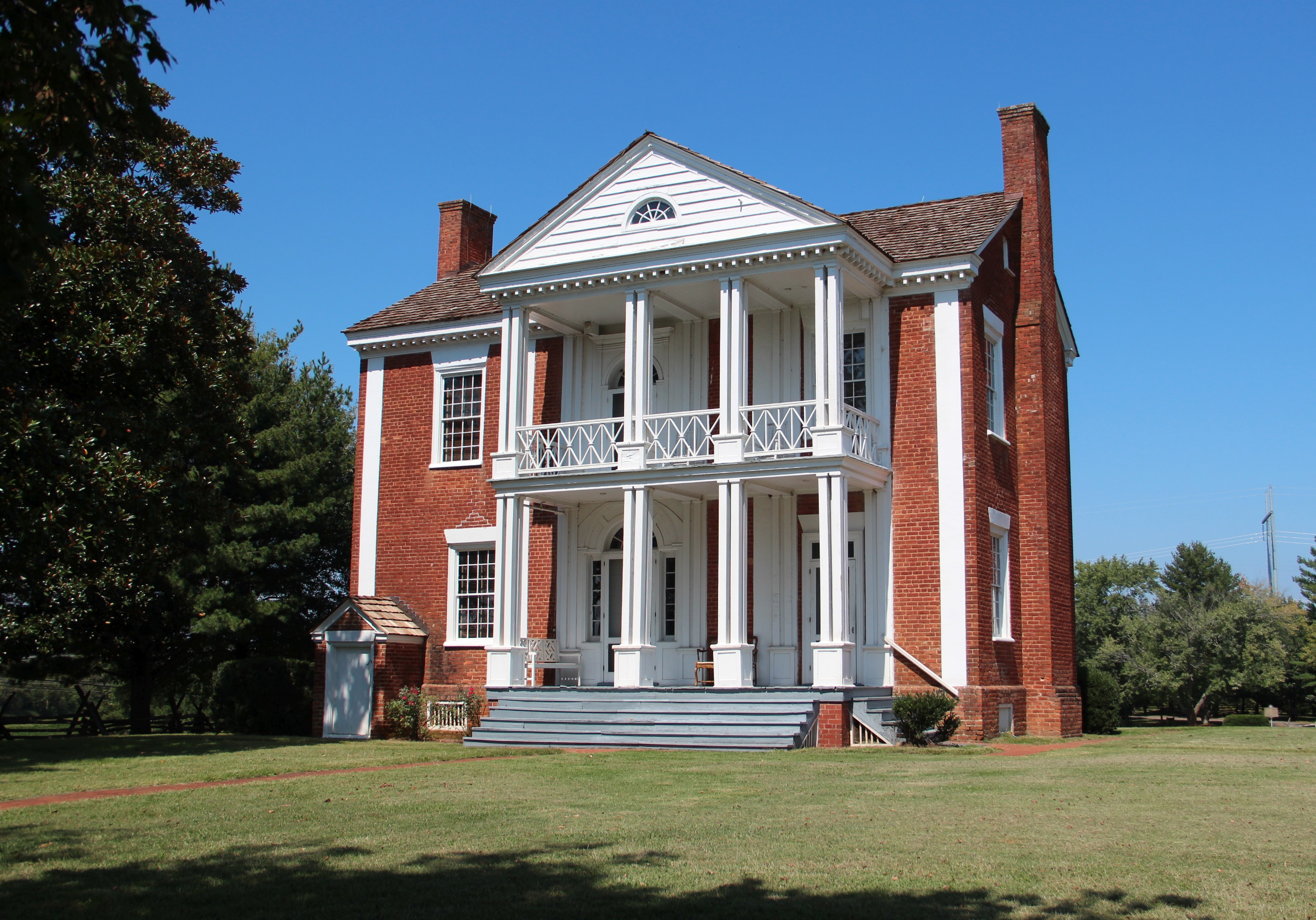
- Chief Vann House

- Location within Georgia Location within the United States
- Location: 82 Highway 225 N, Chatsworth, Georgia
- Coordinates: 34°45′47.10″N 84°49′20.09″W
- Built: 1804
- Architect: Henry Chandlee Forman
- Architectural style: Federal
- NRHP reference No.: 69000044
- Added to NRHP: October 28, 1969

The Chief Vann House is the first brick residence in the Cherokee Nation, and has been called the "Showplace of the Cherokee Nation". Owned by the Cherokee Chief James Vann, the Vann House is a Georgia Historic Site on the National Register of Historic Places, Built in 1804, it is one of the oldest remaining structures in the northern third of the state of Georgia. It is located in Murray County, on the outskirts of Chatsworth in northwest Georgia, which has a commanding view of the land around it and of the Cohutta Mountains, about 10 miles (16 km) to the east.

== Construction of the Vann House ==
When James Vann was rising to become the wealthiest businessman and chief in the Cherokee Nation, he decided to build a two-story brick house which would reflect his status. He brought in professional architects for its design. In addition to providing an education to local Cherokees, the Moravians contributed to the building.

In July 1803, a man named Vogt (perhaps James Vann's brother-in-law Charles Vogt), and Dr. Henry Chandlee Forman, arrived to begin construction. Construction started in late 1803 and completed early in 1804. Both the exterior walls (which are around eighteen inches thick) and the interior walls (about eight inches thick) are solid brick. These bricks came from the red clay located on the Spring Place Plantation (Vann House) property. The handwrought nails and hinges used in construction came from Vann's blacksmith shop. Only the interior walls of the third floor are plaster on wood.

The lead brick mason of this house, Robert Henry Howell, was born in Virginia and died in 1834. He is buried at the nearby Moravian cemetery in Spring Place, Georgia. He also built the McNair house and the foundation of the Hildebrand house.

The house is a combination of late Federal-style architecture and early Georgian style. It has two full stories with a third half story: the ceilings of both the first and second floor stand at twelve feet, while the roof of the third floor stands at only six feet.

The first and second floors have the standard three rooms. On both levels, there is a room to the east, to the west, and a hallway dividing the two. On the first level, the dining room is to the east, while the west room is the drawing-room, more commonly referred to as a family or living room. On the second floor, the east room is the master bedroom, and the west room is the guest bedroom. Only the third floor, which operated as storage space during James's life and then as children's rooms during Joseph's life, strays from this typical design.

From the stairs to the third floor, two rooms are visible. The first one, believed to be the boys' room, is two-thirds the width of the house and has two closets cut into its walls. The second room, the girls' room, is only one-third the width of the house. This room could be closed off from the boys' room, providing the girls with more privacy.

The Vann House also features a basement with two separate rooms, one of which served as a wine cellar. The other was likely a chamber for misbehaving slaves, to whom James Vann was known to be exceptionally cruel.

Decorated in red, blue, green, and yellow, the interior of the home is a timeless masterpiece. White is used throughout the house but only as a filler color. There are two lines of thought for the colors in the home. The first is that these four colors represent different elements of nature. Red represents the Georgia red clay, blue represents the sky, green represents the trees and grass, and yellow represents the wheat and corn of the harvest. The second idea is that these four colors are part of a Federal-style color palette.

These colors are popular in other homes of the late 1700s and early 1800s. The difference between the use of these colors in the Vann House versus other dwellings of the time is color distribution. Most homes of the Federal period would concentrate colors in one room, giving a house a red room, blue room, etc. However, in the Vann House, the colors have been mixed in almost every room, which gives a multi-color appearance. This color scheme is present on the mantels, doorjambs, and wainscottings, all of which are original to the house.

The house's doors, known as Christian doors, are of particular interest. Their details feature a cross and an open Bible.

In addition to the blacksmith shop, the 800-acre (3.2 km^{2}) grounds contained 42 slave cabins, six barns, five smokehouses, a trading post, more than 1,000 peach trees, 147 apple trees, and a still.

After constructing the Vann House, James lived in it for five years before his murder at Buffington's Tavern in 1809. After his death, his favorite child, Rich Joe Vann, neither his youngest nor eldest child, inherited the house.

== Rich Joe's Vann House ==
After Rich Joe's father died, he made improvements and changes to the new house. After Rich Joe took control of the home, he commissioned and paid for decorating the house between 1809 and 1818.

Rich Joe hired a father and son construction crew for this work. In 1818, John McCartney and his son James arrived at the Vann House and began their work. The McCartneys added all of the current woodwork in the house, including ionic columns. They also built the house's most unusual piece of architecture, a floating staircase in the hallway of the third floor. It is said to be "floating" or "hanging," because the second landing of the stairs sits over the first-floor hall with no visible supports, with the illusion that the landing is hanging or floating in midair.

The Vann stairway is one of the oldest examples of cantilevered construction in Georgia. On one side of the main entrance, which initially faced the Federal Road, and works as a set of scales for weight distribution. The staircase, suspended over the first-floor hallway, roughly six inches of the opposite side of the stairway, is in a solid brick wall. The brick wall is far denser than the second landing; this means there will never be enough weight on the landing to "tip the scale."

In 1819, President James Monroe and his three men were on a trip from Augusta to Nashville. They intended to spend the night in the Spartan Moravian mission at Spring Place. Instead, President Monroe went to a nearby location, The Vann House, which he found more comfortable than the mission, so he asked Rich Joe permission to spend the night. Rich Joe was 20 years old when he met President Monroe.

== Eviction of Rich Joe and seizure of Vann House ==
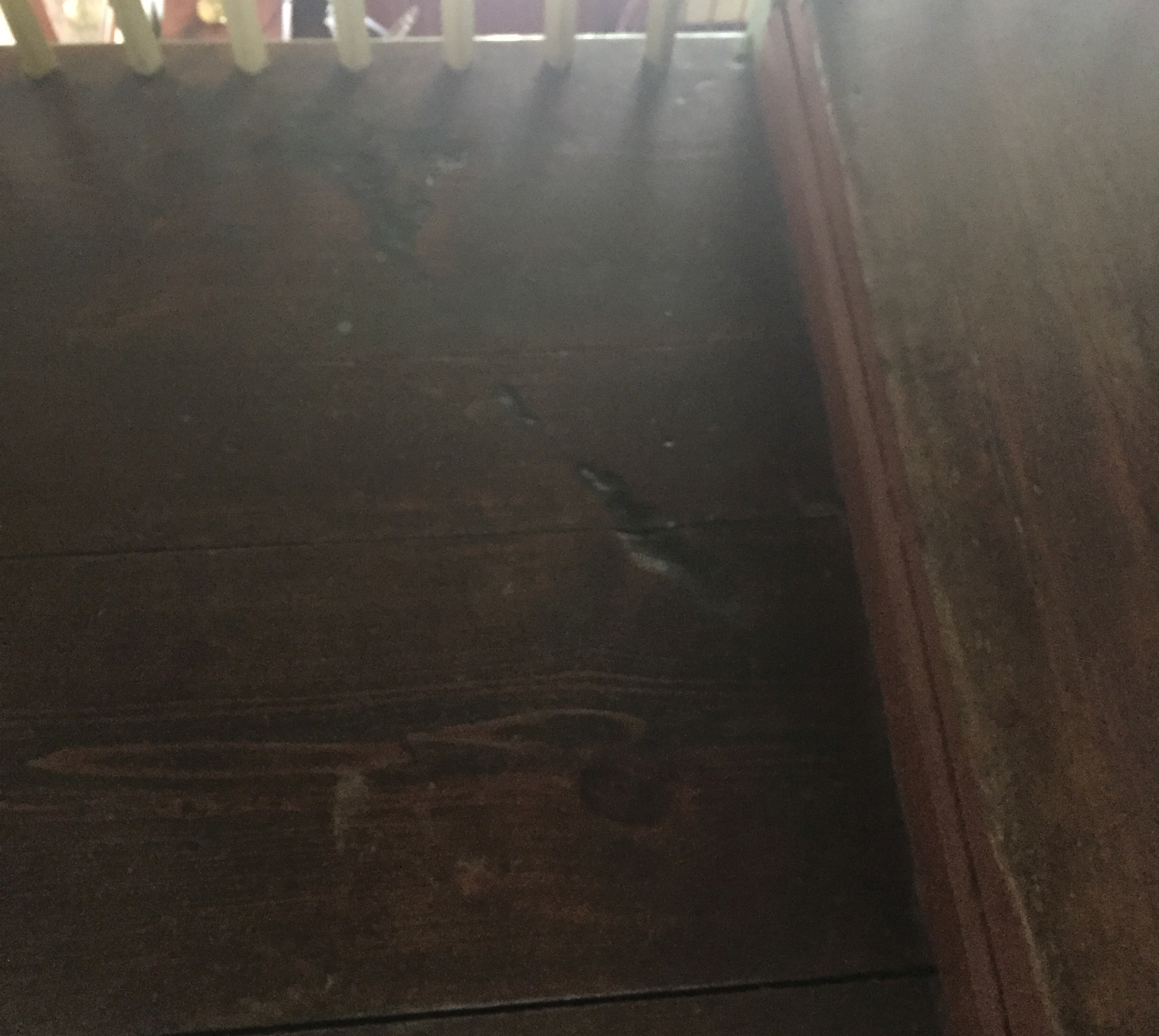
Burn marks on the Vann House's stairs where Colonel Bishop placed a smoldering log in an attempt to smoke out Spencer Riley.

After the Georgia Gold Rush, Rich Joe hired a white man, a Mr. Howel, to run Vann House. Although he never actually worked for Vann, the Cherokee had unknowingly violated a new Georgia law forbidding whites from working for Cherokees without a permit. Leading up to the Cherokee Trail of Tears, Rich Joe and his family were caught amid the struggle between two opposing claims for the house. Colonel William Bishop and the infamous Georgia Guard tried to take over the house on the grounds of his hiring a white man without a permit. Spencer Riley, who claimed to have won the house in the Land Lottery of 1832, known as the Sixth Georgia Land Lottery, claimed the house at the same time. Colonel Bishop then evicted Rich Joe.

Colonel Bishop used the house as his local headquarters and permitted his brother, Absalom Bishop, to live there. Riley then took action on his claim and settled in the house. To get rid of Riley, Bishop took a smoldering log and threw it on the cantilevered steps to smoke him out, causing some damage to the house. This action had its intended effect, and Bishop's brother returned to the home.

Although Vann and his family lost their home and property, he later sued for the loss and was awarded $19,605 by the government as compensation, which was nearly double its value of $10,000 at the time.

In November of that year, Colonel Bishop imprisoned John Howard Payne for 13 days on the grounds of the house. Payne, noted as a composer of "Home, Sweet Home", had been charged with sedition for supporting the claims of the Cherokee over the state of Georgia.

== Restoration of the Vann House ==
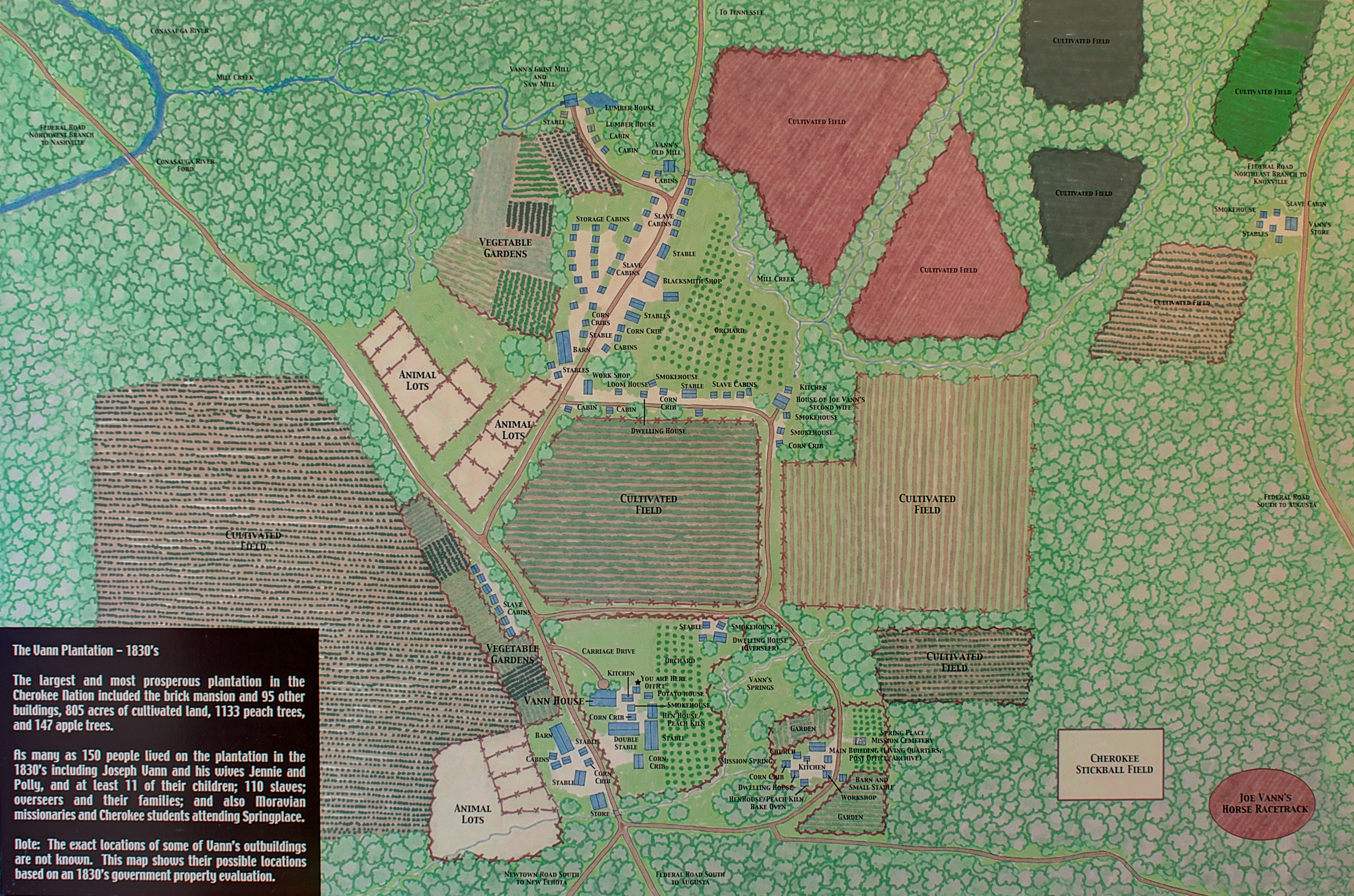
The Vann Plantation

Rich Joe and his family were finally forced out of the house in March 1835 and moved to Webbers Falls, Oklahoma by following the Trail of Tears. They never returned to Georgia or their house.

Over the years, the Vann House has had seventeen different owners. In 1952, J. E. Bradford, a physician who had purchased it in 1920, sold it to the Georgia Historical Commission and the State of Georgia. The house was in such a severe state of disrepair that the roof had come off, and the elements were taking their toll.

One of the owners had added a room after Rich Joe left Georgia. A restoration project began in 1958, spearheaded by Dicksie Bradley Bandy. It took six years to complete, and included demolishing a room that was not present in the original house and repainting the home according to its classic color scheme. Today it is administered by the Parks, Recreation, and Historic Sites division of the Georgia Department of Natural Resources.

== Robert E. Chambers Interpretive Center ==
The State of Georgia, Cherokees, and the State of Oklahoma, as well as other supporters, donated to build a newly designed museum called the "Robert E. Chambers Interpretive Center" in 1999, next to the Vann House. It was opened on July 27, 2002, to honor the Cherokee people and their history. The new center also highlights the lives of Chiefs James and Joseph Vann, as well as featuring the history of the Cherokee Nation over the past 200 years, including the infamous Trail of Tears. Robert E. Chambers was named for supporting the Cherokee, as he was native businessman of Chatsworth.

== See also ==
- James Vann
- Joseph Vann
