= James Vann =

Cherokee leader (d. 1809)

Chief James Vann
- Born: February , 1766; Spring Place, Georgia
- Died: February 19, 1809; Forsyth County, Georgia
- Occupation: Cherokee leader
- Spouse(s): Jennie Foster, Elizabeth Thornton, Margaret "Peggy" Scott et al.

James Vann (c. 1762–64 – February 19, 1809) was a Cherokee leader, one of the triumvirate with Major Ridge and Charles R. Hicks, who led the Upper Towns of East Tennessee and North Georgia as part of the ᎤᏪᏘ ᏣᎳᎩ ᎠᏰᎵ (Uwet Tsalag Ayetl or Old Cherokee Nation). He was the son of ᏩᎵ (Wali) Vann and Indian trader Joseph John Vann. He was born into his mother's Clan, ᎠᏂᎪᏓᎨᏫ (Anigodagewi or Wild Potato Clan, also called Blind Savannah Clan).

Vann was among the younger leaders of the Old Cherokee Nation who thought its people needed to acculturate to deal with the European Americans and the United States government. He encouraged the Moravians to establish a mission school on Cherokee land, and became a wealthy plantation owner and slave owner.

== Early life and education ==
James Vann was born the oldest of three children, most likely in South Carolina near his father-in-law's trading post on the Savannah River. By 1764 his family moved to the mouth of Little River, in Georgia. Wah-li was the daughter of a Cherokee woman of the Anigategawi or Wild Potato People clan, later referred to as "Mrs. Roe." James had two younger sisters, Nancy and Jennie.

The children grew up within the Cherokee culture and clan of their mother. As the Cherokee had a matrilineal system of property and hereditary leadership, the children traditionally gained their status in the tribe from their mother's people. Their maternal uncles were more important to the rearing of the children, especially the boy James, within the Cherokee nation than was their father.

The Vann children were likely bilingual, learning some European-American culture from their father. Wah-li later married Clement Vann (brother of Joseph), who acted as a stepfather to the children. (Sources disagree about the identity of Vann's biological father: Gary E. Moulton of the University of Nebraska, suggests Clement Vann. William H. Vann Jr. in his self-published genealogy book, Vann Generations with Cherokee Origins from John Joseph Vann & James Clement Vann I of NC, SC, TN, GA ca 1750-1989, identified Joseph Vann. Virginia Vann Perry chooses another James Vann, and Belinda Pierce, a contemporary genealogy expert, thinks Joseph John Vann was the father. "According to the experts at the Vann House in Chatsworth, Georgia, Vann's father is unknown.")

== Cherokee–American wars ==
A story was repeated about James Vann that indicates the violence of his times. As a young man, he helped lead the John Watts' 1793 offensive against the Holston River colonial settlements. They originally planned an attack against White's Fort, then capital of the Southwest Territory (as Tennessee was known). As the war party was traveling to the destination, Vann argued they should kill only men, against Doublehead's call to kill all the settlers. Not long after this, the war party of more than 1,000 Cherokee and Muscogee came upon a small settlement called Cavett's Station. Bob Benge, a leading warrior, negotiated the settlers' surrender, saying no captives would be harmed. But, Doublehead's group and his Muscogee Creek allies attacked and began killing the captives, over the pleas of Benge and the others. Vann managed to grab one small boy and pull him onto his saddle, only to have Doublehead smash the boy's skull with an axe. Another warrior saved another young boy, handing him to Vann, who put the boy behind him on his horse. Later he gave him to three of the Muscogee for safe-keeping; a few days later, a Muscogee chief killed and scalped the boy. Vann called Doublehead "Babykiller" for the remainder of his life.

The events were the start of a lengthy feud between the two men. This contributed to the confrontational politics between their respective Upper and Lower Towns of the early 19th-century Cherokee Nation.

== Career ==
Vann became the richest man in the Cherokee Nation. As a result of his favorable negotiations for access and land when the US government built the Federal Road, Vann built his Diamond Hill mansion, a two-story house constructed of brick in 1804, with access to the road, near present-day Chatsworth, Georgia. He also had a store and other facilities there. He donated land for the mission school of the Moravian Brethren, which he had encouraged the Cherokee National Council to permit. His father had earlier run a trading post on that site.

Vann created a ferry across the nearby Conasauga River, and built a tavern and store nearby to supply locals and travelers. He also owned Vann's ferry, which crossed the Chattahoochee River near present-day Atlanta on the road to the Lower Towns of the Muscogee (Creek). Later he opened up a trading post near present-day Huntsville, Alabama.

He held more than 100 slaves and hundreds of acres of plantation. He also owned land at the mouth of Ooltewah (Wolftever) Creek in present-day Hamilton County, Tennessee. His Vann's Ferry landing in Tennessee was the basis for Vann's Town. Later it became the county seat and was called Harrison.

A story was recounted about Vann's wealth. Return J. Meigs Sr., the US Indian agent to the Cherokee living at Cherokee Agency (now Calhoun, Tennessee), found the government had misrouted its annuity payment to the nation (for lands surrendered in treaty) to New Orleans. Meigs turned to Vann for help. Vann paid the annuity in full from his own funds and could wait for Meigs to pay him back after he had received the original annuity.

== Politics ==
In national Cherokee politics, Vann led the so-called "young chiefs" of the Overhill Towns, who rebelled against the oligarchy of those, primarily from the Lower Towns, referred to as the "old chiefs," who were led by Doublehead. The Lower Town chiefs followed more traditional practices. Vann and Charles R. Hicks persuaded a reluctant National Council to permit the establishment of a school operated by the United Brethren (Moravians) of Winston-Salem, North Carolina. Vann furnished the land and building for the Moravian school next to his home at Spring Place, Georgia.

His feud with Doublehead ended in 1807. The Council ordered Doublehead executed for having secretly profited from the private sale of Cherokee land, a capital offense under tribal law. The council appointed Major Ridge and Alexander Saunders from the Nation to carry out the sentence. Vann was also appointed but was said to be too drunk to participate.

As part of changes in tribal practices, in 1808 Vann helped form the Cherokee Lighthorse Guard, a kind of police force to monitor the roads in the Nation to suppress horse stealing and other thefts. That same year, chiefs of the seven clans, plus Black Horse as chief and Pathkiller as his assistant, signed the Act of Oblivion on September 11, 1808, which ended the traditional clan blood law requiring vengeance killings.

While riding patrol, Vann was shot to death at Buffington's Tavern on February 19, 1809. Speculation was that his killer might have been someone related to someone he had wronged, or Alexander Saunders. Further speculation suggests his shooting was organized by his sister, who felt that his drunkenness threatened their family's safety.

Vann was buried in or near Blackburn cemetery, Forsyth County, Georgia. Charles Hicks replaced him on the council.

== Legacy ==
Vann was a shrewd tribal leader and businessman. He owned taverns, ferry boats, grist mills, and livestock. His business activities included a cattle drive to Pennsylvania and a pack train of goods to South Carolina. Vann brought European-American education into the Cherokee Nation with his support of the Moravian mission school. He urged adoption of European-style "civilization" for the positive aspects he observed.

He was noted as having problems with alcohol, which became increasingly severe.

Vann fought a notable duel with his brother-in-law John Falling, with both armed with muskets and on horseback (Falling died). Vann was generous with his money to those in need, but ruthless to those who crossed him. He ordered a slave Isaac, caught stealing, to be burned alive. In the same incident, Vann had a teenaged girl slave hung by her thumbs to tell about the theft; the Moravian missionaries rescued her and tried to dissuade him from the murder of Isaac.

In his will, Vann left nearly all his property to Joseph Vann, his eldest son by Nannie Brown. This followed European-American practice, but differed from the traditional Cherokee matrilineal system of having property passed on through the maternal line. Joseph inherited the Spring Place plantation (Diamond Hill), and the property on the Tennessee River later known as Vann's Town. He became known as "Rich Joe" Vann. Because Vann had gone against tradition, the National Cherokee Council recognized the other children of Vann's nine wives or consorts as minor heirs, and they shared in the inheritance of lesser amounts of property.

His Nephew was David Vann (Cherokee leader) an ancestor of Will Rogers.

== Representation in other media ==
Dee Alexander Brown wrote a novel based on a fictionalized version of Vann's life, called Creek Mary's Blood (1981).
