= Oklahoma State Highway 147 =

State highway in Oklahoma, United States

State Highway 147

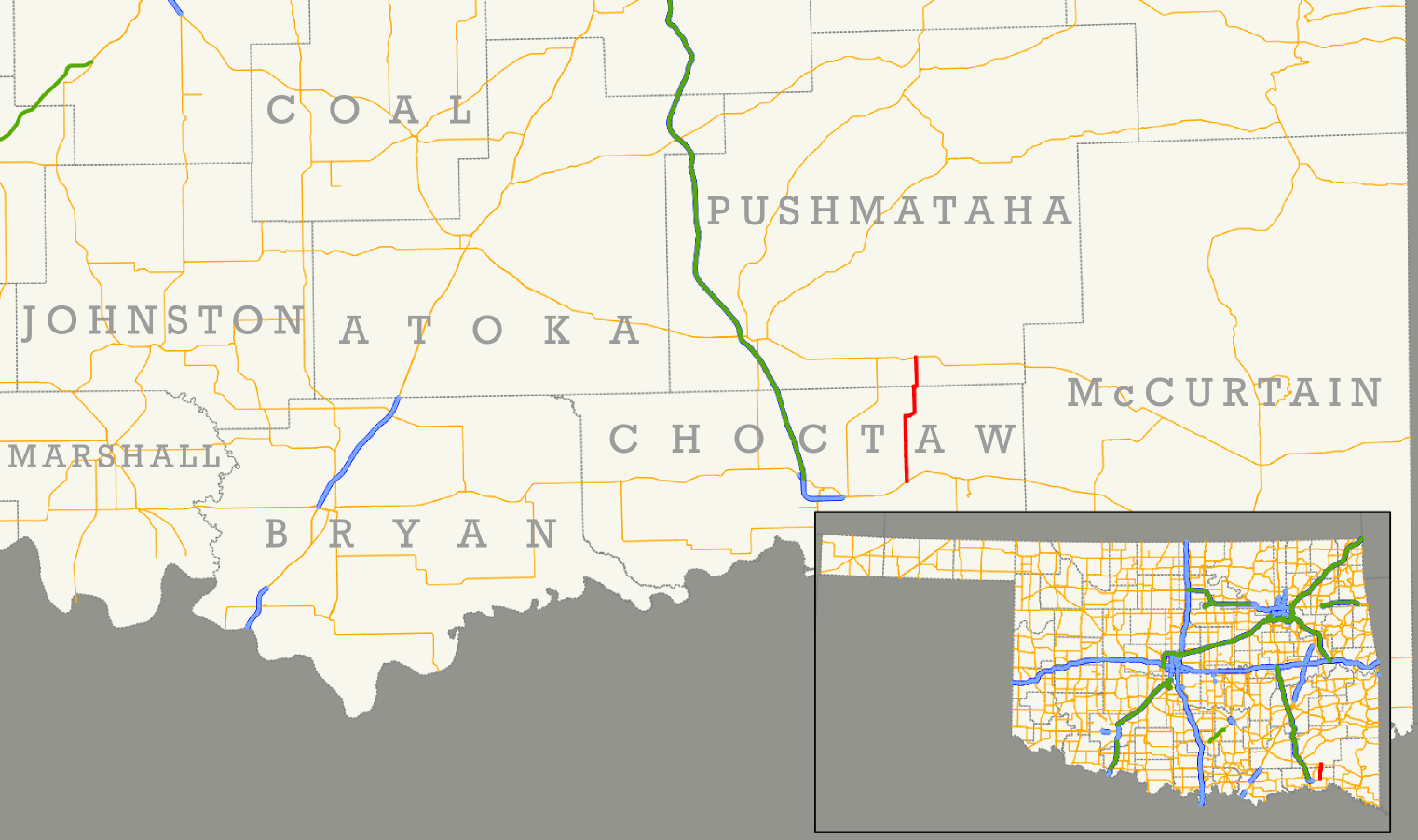

Route information
- Maintained by ODOT
- Length: 13.58 mi (21.85 km)

Major junctions
- South end: US 70 in Sawyer
- North end: SH-3 at Oleta

Location
- Country: United States
- State: Oklahoma

Highway system
- Oklahoma State Highway System; Interstate; US; State; Turnpikes
| ← SH-146 | → SH-149 |

State Highway 147 (abbreviated SH-147) is a state highway in Oklahoma. It runs 13.58 miles (21.85 km) in Choctaw and Pushmataha counties. Highway 147 begins at US-70, just east of Sawyer. From there it runs north, up the east side of Hugo Lake. There is a one-mile (1.6 km) dogleg to the east just south of the community of Spencerville, and another short dogleg east at the Choctaw–Pushmataha county line. SH-147 terminates at SH-3 in Oleta.

== Route description ==
SH-147 begins at US-70 in Sawyer. The route heads north, running east of Hugo Lake and crossing over several of the streams that feed it, including Cedar Creek. About three and a half miles (5.6 km) north of US-70, SH-147 passes through Virgil, an unincorporated place. The highway continues north to a small lake called Schooler Lake, which it passes just east of. The highway then turns east, passing through a series of curves, before returning to a due north course; this section lies east of the community of Spencerville and crosses Spencer Creek. The highway turns east once again at the Choctaw–Pushmataha county line, straddling the border for about a quarter of a mile (0.40 km). The highway returns to a due north course, fully entering Pushmataha County, until Oleta, where it terminates at SH-3.

== Junction list ==
| County | Location | mi | km | Destinations | Notes |
|---|---|---|---|---|---|
| Choctaw | Sawyer | 0.00 | 0.00 | US 70 | Southern terminus |
| Pushmataha | Oleta | 13.58 | 21.85 | SH-3 | Northern terminus |
1.000 mi = 1.609 km; 1.000 km = 0.621 mi
