= Tornado outbreak of April 2–3, 1982 =

Severe weather event in the United States

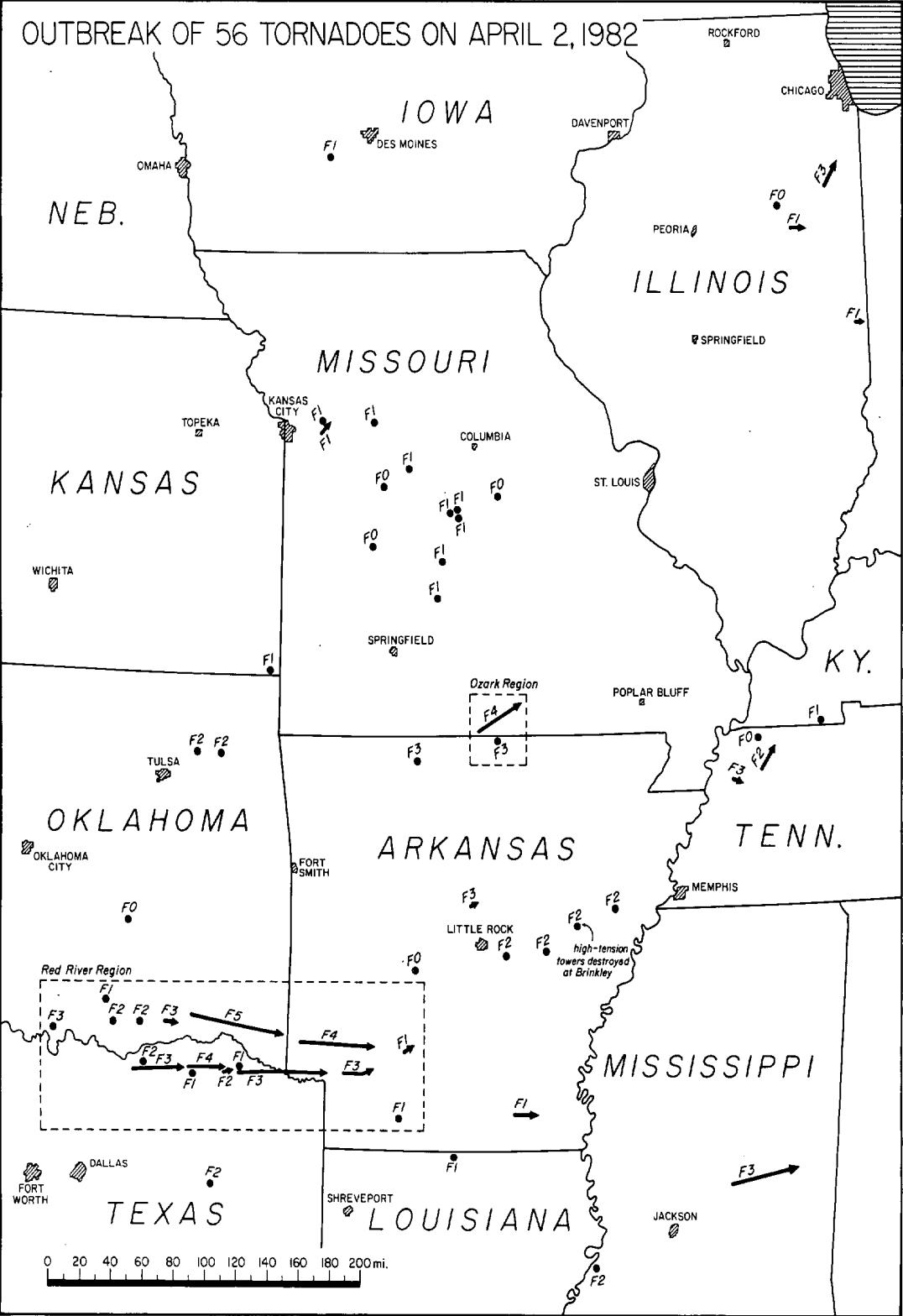
- Overview of the outbreak

Meteorological history
- Duration: April 2–3, 1982

Tornado outbreak
- Tornadoes: 62
- Max. rating: F5 tornado
- Highest winds: 78 kn (90 mph; 144 km/h)
- Largest hail: 3 in (7.6 cm)

Overall effects
- Fatalities: 30
- Injuries: 415
- Damage: $176,811,500 ($589,880,000 in 2025 USD) (Note: All losses are in 1982 USD unless otherwise noted.)
- Areas affected: Midwestern and Southern United States (primarily Ark-La-Tex region: Red River Valley, Piney Woods)
- Part of the tornadoes and tornado outbreaks of 1982

From April 2–3, 1982, a major tornado outbreak resulted in over 60 tornadoes and 30 fatalities, primarily over portions of Northeast Texas and Southwest Arkansas, as well as Southeastern Oklahoma. Three of the tornadoes were rated F4, and one officially was recorded as an F5 near Broken Bow, Oklahoma, all on April 2. Beginning on April 2, a series of tornado-producing supercells formed across portions of northeastern Texas and southeastern Oklahoma. One produced an F5 tornado, the first since April 4, 1977, which crossed mostly rural areas near Speer and Broken Bow, and deposited a motel sign from Broken Bow 30 miles (48 km) away in Arkansas. However, reanalysis a decade later found the rating to be lower, owing to unsound construction practices. (Note: Tornado researcher Thomas P. Grazulis contested the official F5 rating, having concluded that the basis for it was unsound.) The F5 tornado resulted in no fatalities, but an F4 tornado in Paris, Texas, resulted in 10 fatalities and 170 injuries. Additionally, the Storm Prediction Center, known then as the Severe Local Storms Unit, issued its first officially documented high risk on April 2, as well as the first tornado watch to contain the wording Particularly Dangerous Situation (PDS). (Note: An outbreak is generally defined as a group of at least six tornadoes (the number sometimes varies slightly according to local climatology) with no more than a six-hour gap between individual tornadoes. An outbreak sequence, prior to (after) the start of modern records in 1950, is defined as a period of no more than two (one) consecutive days without at least one significant (F2 or stronger) tornado.)

== Outbreak statistics ==
Daily statistics of tornadoes during the tornado outbreak of April 2–3, 1982
Date (Note: All dates are based on the local time zone where the tornado touched down; however, all times are in Coordinated Universal Time and dates are split at midnight CST/CDT for consistency.)	Total	F-scale rating (Note: The Fujita scale was devised under the aegis of scientist T. Theodore Fujita in the early 1970s. Prior to the advent of the scale in 1971, tornadoes in the United States were officially unrated. Tornado ratings were retroactively applied to events prior to the formal adoption of the F-scale by the National Weather Service. While the Fujita scale has been superseded by the Enhanced Fujita scale in the U.S. since February 1, 2007, Canada used the old scale until April 1, 2013; nations elsewhere, like the United Kingdom, apply other classifications such as the TORRO scale.)							Deaths	Injuries	Damage (Note: The National Oceanic and Atmospheric Administration's Storm Data publication does not list exact damage totals for every event, instead giving damage categories. As such, damage for individual tornadoes is not comprehensive.)
Date	Total	FU	F0	F1	F2	F3	F4	F5	Deaths	Injuries	Damage
April 2	49	0	6	19	11	9	4	1	27	345	$142,730,500
April 3	13	0	2	7	2	2	0	0	3	70	$34,081,000
Total	62	0	8	26	13	11	4	1	30	415	$176,811,500

Outbreak death toll
State	Total	County	County total
Arkansas	14	Faulkner	2
Arkansas	14	Fulton	2
Arkansas	14	Hempstead	5
Arkansas	14	Howard	3
Arkansas	14	Little River	1
Arkansas	14	St. Francis	1
Mississippi	3	Neshoba	3
Missouri	1	Howell	1
Texas	11	Fannin	1
Texas	11	Lamar	10
Totals	30		
All deaths were tornado-related

== Confirmed tornadoes ==
Confirmed tornadoes by Fujita rating
FU	F0	F1	F2	F3	F4	F5	Total
0	8	26	13	11	3	1	62

Prior to 1990, there is a likely undercount of tornadoes, particularly E/F0–1, with reports of weaker tornadoes becoming more common as population increased. A sharp increase in the annual average E/F0–1 count by approximately 200 tornadoes was noted upon the implementation of NEXRAD Doppler weather radar in 1990–1991. (Note: Historically, the number of tornadoes globally and in the United States was and is likely underrepresented: research by Grazulis on annual tornado activity suggests that, as of 2001, only 53% of yearly U.S. tornadoes were officially recorded. Documentation of tornadoes outside the United States was historically less exhaustive, owing to the lack of monitors in many nations and, in some cases, to internal political controls on public information. Most countries only recorded tornadoes that produced severe damage or loss of life. Significant low biases in U.S. tornado counts likely occurred through the early 1990s, when advanced NEXRAD was first installed and the National Weather Service began comprehensively verifying tornado occurrences.) 1974 marked the first year where significant tornado (E/F2+) counts became homogenous with contemporary values, attributed to the consistent implementation of Fujita scale assessments. Numerous discrepancies on the details of tornadoes in this outbreak exist between sources. The total count of tornadoes and ratings differs from various agencies accordingly. The list below documents information from the most contemporary official sources alongside assessments from tornado historian Thomas P. Grazulis.

Color/symbol key
Color / symbol	Description
†	Data from Grazulis 1990/1993/2001b
¶	Data from a local National Weather Service office
※	Data from the 1982 Storm Data publication
‡	Data from the NCEI database
♯	Maximum width of tornado
±	Tornado was rated below F2 intensity by Grazulis but a specific rating is unavailable.

Confirmed tornadoes – Friday, April 2, 1982
F#	Location	County / Parish	State	Start Coord. (Note: All starting coordinates are based on the NCEI database and may not reflect contemporary analyses)	Time (UTC)	Path length	Width (Note: The listed width values are primarily the average/mean width of the tornadoes, with those having known maximum widths denoted by ♯. From 1952 to 1994, reports largely list mean width whereas contemporary years list maximum width. Values provided by Grazulis are the average width, with estimates being rounded down (i.e. 0.5 mi (0.80 km) is rounded down from 880 yards to 800 yards.)	Damage
F0	Hot Springs Village※	Garland	Arkansas	34.50°N 93.05°W	20:00–?	0.1 mi (0.16 km)‡	10 yd (9.1 m)‡	$2,500
F0	A short-lived tornado damaged a few thousand trees and utility lines near La Villa.							
F1	SSW of Earlham※	Madison	Iowa	41.45°N 94.17°W	20:10–?	0.5 mi (0.80 km)	50 yd (46 m)	$25,000
F1	A brief tornado unroofed a garage, destroyed two sheds, and damaged two windmills and a farmhouse. An 80-foot-tall (24 m) radio tower was downed, shingles were torn loose, and windows were smashed as well.							
F2	Silo※	Bryan	Oklahoma	34.05°N 95.48°W	20:25–?	0.5 mi (0.80 km)	30 yd (27 m)	$2,500,000
F2	This tornado damaged a total of 16 mobile homes and houses. One person received minor injuries.							
F1	Pink Hill to SSW of Levasy※	Jackson	Missouri	39.05°N 94.18°W	20:30–?	6.8 mi (10.9 km)‡	300 yd (270 m)	$250,000
F1	This tornado, which developed 1 1/2 mi (2.4 km) north of Grain Valley, sheared treetops. Nearby, a home and several buildings were damaged.							
F1	SE of Emet	Johnston	Oklahoma	34.18°N 96.52°W	20:30–?	0.5 mi (0.80 km)	10 yd (9.1 m)	$250,000
F1	A pickup truck, a barn, and several other structures were damaged or destroyed.							
F1	W of Levasy※	Jackson	Missouri	39.13°N 94.13°W	20:32–?	2 mi (3.2 km)	700 yd (640 m)	$25,000
F1	This multiple-vortex tornado destroyed a couple of barns, a garage, and poles.							
F0	E of Allen※	Hughes	Oklahoma	34.87°N 96.33°W	20:40–?	0.1 mi (0.16 km)‡	10 yd (9.1 m)‡	$250
F0	Trees in the countryside were downed. The tornado passed northwest of Gerty.							
F2	Northeastern Claremore※	Rogers	Oklahoma	36.40°N 95.55°W	20:45–?	1 mi (1.6 km)	50 yd (46 m)	$250,000
F2	A school and several businesses incurred damage. The NCEI incorrectly list the touchdown as being southwest of Sequoyah.							
F1	Southwestern Baxter Springs※	Cherokee	Kansas	37.02°N 94.73°W	20:50–?	0.2 mi (0.32 km)	17 yd (16 m)	$25,000
F1	Mobile homes and other structures received damage, as well as roofing, windows, and electrical lines.							
F3±	N of Marietta	Love	Oklahoma	33.97°N 97.12°W	20:50–?	0.5 mi (0.80 km)	30 yd (27 m)	$2,500,000
F3±	This tornado derailed 24 freight cars, most of which were unfilled. Outbuildings and trees were also damaged nearby.							
F2±	ENE of Pryor Creek	Mayes	Oklahoma	36.33°N 95.27°W	21:00–?	0.5 mi (0.80 km)	10 yd (9.1 m)	$25,000
F2±	This tornado flipped a mobile home.							
F2	N of Bokchito※	Bryan	Oklahoma	34.03°N 96.13°W	21:05–?	0.5 mi (0.80 km)	10 yd (9.1 m)	$25,000
F2	This tornado damaged seven homes.							
F0	Iconium※	St. Clair	Missouri	38.12°N 93.53°W	21:07–?	0.3 mi (0.48 km)‡	50 yd (46 m)	Unknown
F0	A brief touchdown failed to produce any damage.							
F3	WNW of Boswell to N of Soper‡	Choctaw	Oklahoma	34.07°N 95.95°W	21:10–?	8 mi (13 km)	100 yd (91 m)	$250,000
F3	Many farms and outbuildings were damaged.							
F0	Green Ridge※	Pettis	Missouri	38.62°N 93.40°W	21:15–?	0.3 mi (0.48 km)‡	50 yd (46 m)	Unknown
F0	No damage was reported.							
F3	SW of Boyd to WNW of Toco※	Fannin, Lamar	Texas	33.63°N 96.28°W	21:20–21:55※	32 mi (51 km)	150 yd (140 m)	~$1,000,000※
F3	1 death – This tornado developed near Ravenna and tracked eastward at 50 mph (80 km/h) through Allens Chapel and Allens Point. The most extensive damage occurred in these two communities; an elderly woman in the area was killed, and her husband sustained injuries. Along its entire path, the tornado destroyed numerous frame houses, mobile homes, barns, and rural outbuildings. The NCEI incorrectly list the path as extending from north of Ector to just north of Brookston.							
F1	SW of Waverly	Lafayette	Missouri	39.17°N 93.55°W	21:25–?	1.3 mi (2.1 km)‡	50 yd (46 m)	$250
F1	This tornado felled trees in an orchard.							
F2±	Boyd	Fannin	Texas	33.65°N 96.17°W	21:25–?	1 mi (1.6 km)	50 yd (46 m)※	Unknown
F2±	Trees were damaged near Lake Bonham.							
F2	Keo	Lonoke	Arkansas	34.60°N 92.02°W	21:45–?	1 mi (1.6 km)	100 yd (91 m)	$2,500,000
F2	This was the first member of a long-tracked tornado family, the parent thunderstorm of which generated a 100-mile-long (160 km) swath of scattered damage, felling 60 transmission towers along the way, and traveled as far as Forrest City. Two homes and a cropdusting firm were destroyed or damaged. Two people were injured.							
F5	S of Speer to Messer to SE of Eagletown※	Choctaw, McCurtain	Oklahoma	34.13°N 95.57°W	21:50–?	53 mi (85 km)	2,640 yd (2,410 m)♯※	$8,000,000※
F5	See section on this tornado – 29 people were injured.							
F2	Slovak	Prairie	Arkansas	34.65°N 91.58°W	22:00–?	2.25 mi (3.62 km)※	20 yd (18 m)†	$250,000
F2	This short-lived tornado damaged rural shops, roofs, outbuildings, machinery, and electrical transmission towers.							
F4	Northern Paris to NE of Detroit※	Lamar, Red River	Texas	33.65°N 95.63°W	22:00–22:30※	23 mi (37 km)	300 yd (270 m)♯※	≥ $50,000,000※
F4	10 deaths – See section on this tornado – 170 people were injured.							
F1	SSW of Paris	Lamar	Texas	33.63°N 95.58°W	22:05–?	≥ 1 mi (1.6 km)	50 yd (46 m)	$25,000
F1	Outflow by the Paris F4 may have helped generate this near-simultaneous tornado. A small structure was destroyed on the outskirts of Paris. The tornado may have continued farther, damaging trailers on the southern sides of Blossom and Reno, as it paralleled the main event.							
F2	Northern Bagwell※	Red River	Texas	33.63°N 95.22°W	22:30–?	5 mi (8.0 km)	100 yd (91 m)	$25,000
F2	This tornado began and ended a few miles west-southwest and east-northeast of town, respectively. Some businesses and homes were unroofed. Trees were torn apart as well.							
F1	N of Clarksville‡	Red River	Texas	33.65°N 95.05°W	22:40–22:42※	2 mi (3.2 km)	50 yd (46 m)※	$2,500
F1	Only minor damage was reported.							
F3	NE of Clarksville (TX)‡ to NNW of Ogden (AR)※	Red River (TX), Bowie (TX), McCurtain (OK), Little River (AR)	Texas, Oklahoma, Arkansas	33.63°N 95.03°W	22:40–23:40※	52 mi (84 km)	400 yd (370 m)	Unknown
F3	1 death – See section on this tornado – Four people were injured.							
F2	Brinkley	Monroe	Arkansas	34.88°N 91.18°W	22:49–?	0.1 mi (0.16 km)	33 yd (30 m)	$2,500,000
F2	20 transmission towers were downed. Several homes, a trio of farms, and a cemetery were damaged as well.							
F2	Forrest City	St. Francis	Arkansas	35.02°N 90.77°W	23:15–?	2 mi (3.2 km)†	60 yd (55 m)	$250,000
F2	1 death – This tornado damaged or destroyed a dozen homes, seven mobile homes, half a dozen businesses, and a school. The death occurred in a trailer. 13 people were injured.							
F4	WSW of Stringtown to ESE of Wallaceburg	Sevier, Howard, Hempstead	Arkansas	33.93°N 94.28°W	23:20–?	45 mi (72 km)	200 yd (180 m)	$7,500,000
F4	3 deaths – This powerful tornado proceeded generally eastward at 25 mph (40 km/h) and affected several rural communities. 15 homes, two mobile homes, 16 chicken coops, and various outbuildings were damaged or destroyed, along with many trees. All of the deaths occurred in the community of Buck Range, near Nashville, where a home was flattened. Most of the damage was F2 or F3 in intensity. Storm Data and the NCEI listed 23 injuries, but a reanalysis by Grazulis found 27.							
F1	E of Eldon	Miller	Missouri	38.35°N 92.53°W	23:25–?	0.25 mi (0.40 km)※	30 yd (27 m)	$250,000
F1	A few outbuildings were destroyed.							
F3	Bergman※	Boone	Arkansas	36.32°N 93.00°W	23:28–?	1 mi (1.6 km)	100 yd (91 m)	$2,500,000
F3	A few trailers were destroyed, along with a pair of homes, the fire department, and city hall. 29 homes sustained damage as well. Five injuries occurred.							
F1	N of Phillipsburg	Laclede	Missouri	37.62°N 92.78°W	23:30–?	0.25 mi (0.40 km)※	30 yd (27 m)	$250,000
F1	A house was damaged, a barn wrecked, and cattle killed.							
F1	NE of Beaman※	Pettis	Missouri	38.77°N 93.13°W	23:35–?	1 mi (1.6 km)	30 yd (27 m)	$25,000
F1	A few barns were wrecked and a home partly so.							
F1	N of Eldon	Miller	Missouri	38.38°N 92.58°W	23:45–?	1 mi (1.6 km)	25 yd (23 m)※	$250,000
F1	A few barns and a trailer were wrecked. A shed was severely damaged as well.							
F3	S of McNab to E of Hope※	Hempstead	Arkansas	33.63°N 93.80°W	00:55–?	18 mi (29 km)	200 yd (180 m)	$2,500,000
F3	5 deaths – This erratic tornado destroyed or damaged 37 homes. A five-member family at home was fatally crushed beneath a 40-foot-tall (12 m) oak tree. The tornado also damaged 850 acres (340 ha) of pine and hardwood forest. 23 people were injured.							
F4	E of Tecumseh※ to Caulfield to West Plains	Ozark, Howell	Missouri	36.57°N 92.22°W	00:15–?	20 mi (32 km)	500 yd (460 m)	$50,000,000
F4	2 deaths – This violent tornado damaged 20 homes and destroyed five trailers, but leveled only one home. Lesser damage occurred to businesses. Most of the damage was to 200 used automobiles at a dealership. 28 people were injured, three seriously.							
F1	S of Camdenton※	Camden	Missouri	39.98°N 92.75°W	00:15–?	0.25 mi (0.40 km)※	25 yd (23 m)※	Unknown
F1	Details are unavailable.							
F3	N of Vidette†	Fulton	Arkansas	36.43°N 92.12°W	00:20–?	1.5 mi (2.4 km)	880 yd (800 m)	$250,000
F3	2 deaths – A barn and five homes were damaged. A number of cattle were killed, and one home was wrecked. Two injuries occurred.							
F1	NE of Eldon※	Miller	Missouri	38.37°N 92.57°W	00:37–?	0.5 mi (0.80 km)	50 yd (46 m)	Unknown
F1	Details are unavailable.							
F0	Taos	Cole	Missouri	38.50°N 92.07°W	00:45–?	0.5 mi (0.80 km)	50 yd (46 m)	Unknown
F0	Details are unavailable.							
F1	Magnolia	Columbia	Arkansas	33.27°N 93.23°W	01:00–?	1.5 mi (2.4 km)	200 yd (180 m)	$25,000
F1	Roofing, power lines, and trees were damaged. Fallen wires ignited a few fires. Two people were injured.							
F3	Conway	Faulkner	Arkansas	35.08°N 92.45°W	01:00–?	3.5 mi (5.6 km)	440 yd (400 m)	$2,500,000
F3	2 deaths – A machine shop, 38 trailers, and 10 homes were flattened. A few other trailers and three homes were seriously damaged. One of the dead was a stillborn infant. 37 injuries occurred, many quite severe.							
F1	E of Whelen Springs to WNW of Kansas	Clark	Arkansas	33.83°N 93.12°W	01:15–?	8 mi (13 km)	75 yd (69 m)※	$250,000
F1	Some roofing was damaged, along with much timber.							
F3	NE of Dyersburg※	Dyer	Tennessee	36.03°N 89.38°W	01:20–?	8 mi (13 km)	75 yd (69 m)※	$2,500,000
F3	A factory, mobile homes, eight homes, and some businesses were destroyed or damaged. Trees were impacted as well. An injury occurred.							
F2	W of Kenton to W of Martin※	Obion, Weakley	Tennessee	36.22°N 89.07°W	01:58–?	12 mi (19 km)†	80 yd (73 m)†	$250,000※
F2	Windows were broken and structures damaged at a Texas Gas Transmission facility. A few trailers were wrecked elsewhere, and several better-built buildings were damaged, along with trees.							
F1	NW of Lillie	Union	Louisiana	32.95°N 92.72°W	02:00–?	5 mi (8.0 km)	50 yd (46 m)	Unknown
F1	Only trees were damaged.							
F1	W of Milo to N of Snyder※	Ashley	Arkansas	33.30°N 91.97°W	03:00–?	19 mi (31 km)	100 yd (91 m)	$2,500,000
F1	Outbuildings, power lines, and trailers received damage. 1,000,000 to 2,000,000 board feet (2,400 to 4,700 m^{3}) of pinewood were flattened.							
F1	Hazel	Calloway	Kentucky	36.50°N 88.32°W	04:00–?	2 mi (3.2 km)	50 yd (46 m)	$250,000
F1	Many older structures in town were wrecked.							
F0	Union City	Obion	Tennessee	36.42°N 89.05°W	04:33–?※	0.3 mi (0.48 km)	30 yd (27 m)※	$250,000
F0	A few large, fallen trees damaged vehicles and homes. Signage and windows were damaged as well.							

=== April 3 event ===
Confirmed tornadoes – Saturday, April 3, 1982
F#	Location	County / Parish	State	Start Coord.	Time (UTC)	Path length	Width	Damage
F0	NE of Pontiac※	Livingston	Illinois	40.90°N 88.58°W	05:00–05:15※	0.3 mi (0.48 km)	200 yd (180 m)	$250,000
F0	A toolshed, a garage, and a quartet of silos were wrecked.							
F1	Southeastern Ridge Farm※	Vermilion	Illinois	39.90°N 87.65°W	05:18–?	4 mi (6.4 km)	125 yd (114 m)※	$250,000
F1	A five-block swath of town was impacted. A trailer and five homes were wrecked. 15 other homes sustained damage as well. Five injuries occurred.							
F1	S of Forrest to S of Chatsworth※	Livingston	Illinois	40.23°N 88.40°W	05:18–?	6 mi (9.7 km)	500 yd (460 m)	$250,000
F1	This tornado blew central heating and refrigeration units off rooftops. A wall was knocked down as well. After hitting Chatsworth the tornado apparently redeveloped to the south, damaging high-voltage cables, sheds, a pair of large barns, a garage, a home, and roofing. 41 utility poles along the path were felled as well.							
F2±	E of Grand Gulf	Claiborne※	Mississippi	32.03°N 91.03°W	05:20–?※	0.1 mi (0.16 km)‡	33 yd (30 m)‡	$6,000※
F2±	A few steel outbuildings were wrecked and a couple of big trees splintered near a hunting camp. One other outbuilding sustained damage as well. The NCEI incorrectly list the touchdown as Adams County and spuriously count 40 injuries; the latter are not listed in Storm Data.							
F3	S of Carthage to N of De Kalb†	Leake, Neshoba, Kemper	Mississippi	32.72°N 89.52°W	05:35–06:10※	42 mi (68 km)	400 yd (370 m)	>$5,000,000※
F3	3 deaths – This intense tornado destroyed five automobiles, 25 mobile homes, seven businesses, and 29 homes. Severe damage occurred to 47 other homes, 25 vehicles, 16 mobile homes, and seven more businesses. All the dead were killed in a trailer. 40 injuries occurred.							
F3	Irwin to Bourbonnais to Indian Oaks※	Kankakee	Illinois	41.05°N 87.98°W	05:40–?	12 mi (19 km)	750 yd (690 m)	$25,000,000
F3	This intense tornado tore walls and a steeple off structures in Irwin, causing a church to shift on its foundation. The tornado apparently lifted before causing further damage at Bourbonnais. 174 trailers were damaged or destroyed in a mobile home park at Indian Oaks. The tornado also damaged 10 homes elsewhere in town. 15 injuries occurred.							
F1	E of Charleston to northeastern Oakland※	Coles	Illinois	39.48°N 88.18°W	06:05–?	14 mi (23 km)	450 yd (410 m)	$250,000
F1	Most of the losses were to sheds, homes, and garages at Oakland. Roofing was torn loose as well.							
F0	SW of Goodenow to Crete※	Will	Illinois	41.33°N 87.68°W	06:10–?	8 mi (13 km)	125 yd (114 m)	$250,000
F0	A few mobile homes were tipped onto their sides, and 25 others were carried off their homesites. A few trees were downed and a chimney was damaged as well. Damage was discontinuous.							
F1	Near West Jefferson※	Madison	Ohio	39.93°N 83.27°W	10:00–?	3 mi (4.8 km)	50 yd (46 m)	$2,500,000
F1	Mobile homes were extensively damaged, other homes less severely. One person was injured.							
F1	SSE of Greenmount	Laurel	Kentucky	37.25°N 84.03°W	10:00–?	1 mi (1.6 km)	25 yd (23 m)※	$25,000
F1	A 108-by-36-foot (33 by 11 m) barn was wrecked, crushing implements inside.							
F2	N of Fredericktown	Knox	Ohio	40.50°N 82.55°W	10:55–?	0.75 mi (1.21 km)※	50 yd (46 m)	$250,000
F2	A few trailers and a frame home were wrecked. Trees were felled as well, and other structures were damaged. Nine minor injuries were reported.							
F1	Glasgow to S of Boston	Thomas	Georgia	30.73°N 83.87°W	17:15–?	6 mi (9.7 km)	70 yd (64 m)	$25,000
F1	A pumping station and a cottage were wrecked. Trees were knocked down as well.							
F1	Western Allentown	Lehigh	Pennsylvania	40.60°N 75.50°W	20:55–?	0.15 mi (0.24 km)※	17 yd (16 m)※	$25,000
F1	A trailer and a shed were flattened. A restaurant was damaged as well. Wires and trees were toppled.							

=== Speer–Messer–Golden–Broken Bow, Oklahoma ===
Speer–Messer–Golden–Broken Bow, Oklahoma
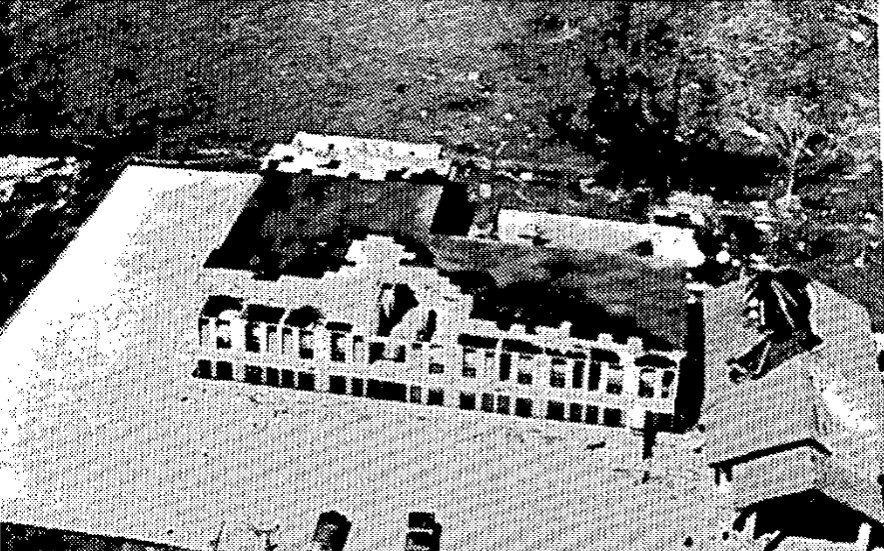
- Damage to a motel south of Broken Bow

Meteorological history
- Date: April 2, 1982
- Formed: April 2, 1982, 3:50 p.m. CST (UTC−05:00)
- Dissipated: April 2, 1982, 4:40 p.m. CST (UTC−05:00)
- Duration: 50 minutes

F5 tornado
- on the Fujita scale
- Highest winds: 261–318 mph (420–512 km/h)

Overall effects
- Injuries: 29
- Damage: $8 million ($26,690,000 in 2025 USD)

This powerful and destructive multiple-vortex tornado touched down near Speer, tracked east-southeastward through the rural community of Messer, and traversed the Hugo Reservoir. A newly constructed home near Messer was obliterated, with only strips of carpet tacking left on its foundation. Surveyed by Ted Fujita, the tornado was assigned a rating of F5 based on this damage and is still listed as an F5 in official records. Photographs of the bare concrete slab suggested, however, that the home was improperly anchored: only F3-level winds may have been needed to produce the observable effects on the structure. A reanalysis by Thomas P. Grazulis in 1993 concluded that the tornado did not attain F5 intensity. Further on, the tornado attained a peak width of 1 1/2 mi (2.4 km; 2,600 yd; 2,400 m) and produced F4-level damage to ranch-style homes near Golden. In all, the tornado destroyed approximately 35 homes and yielded losses of $8 million, though it missed densely populated areas. The tornado also destroyed chicken coops, mobile homes, and a church, along with agricultural implements, electrical lines, and tracts of timber. Up to 40 barns were wrecked as well. As it passed just south of Broken Bow, the tornado struck the Tri-A-Nite Motel; signage from the motel was later found 30 mi (48 km) distant, in Arkansas. Near Messer, the tornado hurled a 2-by-4-inch (51 by 102 mm) board into and pierced a tree. Twenty-nine injuries occurred along the path. The NCEI incorrectly list the path as extending from south-southwest of Hamden to south of Eagletown.

=== Paris–Reno–Blossom, Texas ===
Paris–Reno–Blossom, Texas
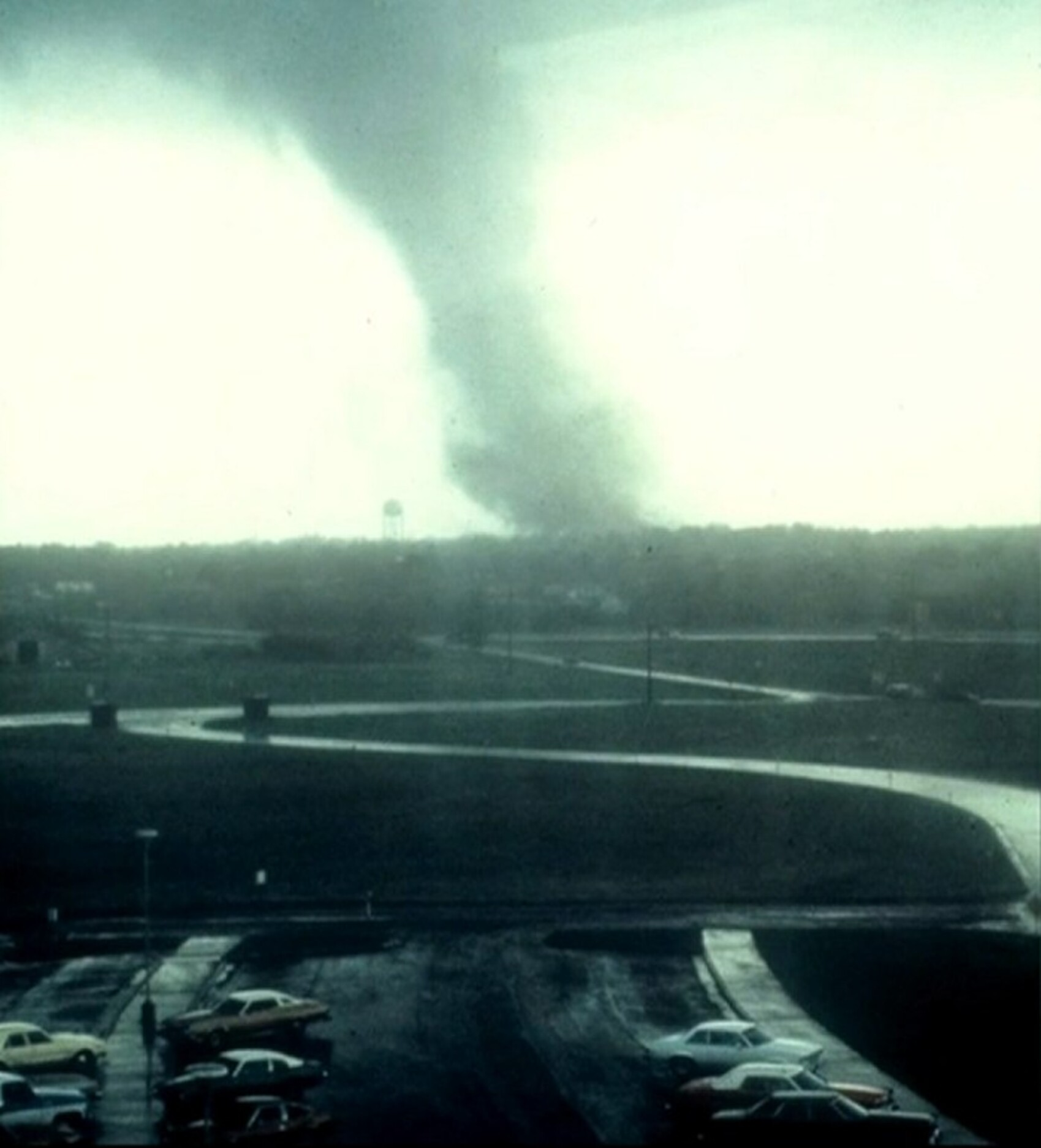
- A picture taken of the tornado in Paris, Texas.

Meteorological history
- Date: April 2, 1982
- Formed: April 2, 1982, 4:00 p.m. CST (UTC−05:00)
- Dissipated: April 2, 1982, 4:30 p.m. CST (UTC−05:00)
- Duration: 30 minutes

F4 tornado
- on the Fujita scale
- Highest winds: 207–260 mph (333–418 km/h)

Overall effects
- Fatalities: 10
- Injuries: 170
- Damage: ≥ $50 million ($166,810,000 in 2025 USD)

This destructive tornado, the deadliest of the outbreak, headed eastward through the northern section of Paris. Developing near the intersection of Campbell Street and Loop 286, it extensively damaged or destroyed more than 465 residences and left approximately 1,000 people homeless in town. Of the 10 deaths in Paris, two occurred at a trailer park; the rest of the fatalities were mainly in unsheltered locations. Debris from the trailer park was dispersed for hundreds of yards. Most of the damage in Paris was rated F2 or F3 on the Fujita scale, but a few CBS homes were leveled at low-end F4 intensity. These homes, however, were dubiously constructed, so the official rating may have been too high. Large, well-built apartments with numerous interior walls were unroofed as the "ragged funnel cloud" left behind $50 million in losses at Paris. 92 homes and other structures were heavily damaged or destroyed in the neighbouring communities of Reno and Blossom. That more casualties did not occur was attributable to the fact that residents of Paris received ample warning, up to half an hour in advance, in part via NOAA Weather Radio.

=== White Rock, Texas/McCurtain County, Oklahoma/Ashdown, Arkansas ===
Tri-State (Texas, Oklahoma, Arkansas)
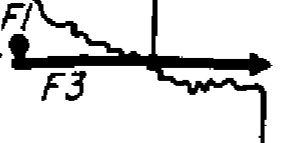
- Path of this tri-state tornado

Meteorological history
- Date: April 2, 1982
- Formed: April 2, 1982, 4:40 p.m. CST (UTC−05:00)
- Dissipated: April 2, 1982, 5:40 p.m. CST (UTC−05:00)
- Duration: 1 hour

F3 tornado
- on the Fujita scale
- Highest winds: 158–206 mph (254–332 km/h)

Overall effects
- Fatalities: 1
- Injuries: 4

This intense, long-tracked, tri state tornado destroyed barns, outbuildings, trees, and electrical lines as it struck White Rock. Brick homes in the area were wrecked as well, indicating F3 intensity. The tornado then tracked to the north of Annona, Avery, and English. Entering Bowie County, it destroyed five homes in Beaver Dam. Two minor injuries occurred nearby. The tornado then widened to 400 yd (370 m) as it neared the Red River. Upon crossing the river, it damaged a 4-mile-long (6.4 km) swath of trees across McCurtain County, Oklahoma. Some outbuildings were also damaged as the tornado passed through southeastern Oklahoma. In Arkansas, the tornado destroyed 17 homes, a paper mill, a granary, and an orchard. One of the homes dated to the early nineteenth century. One person died and two others were injured near Ashdown before the tornado dissipated. The parent storm continued on and later spawned another F3 tornado in Hempstead County, near McNab.

== See also ==
- List of tornado outbreaks
  - List of North American tornadoes and tornado outbreaks
- List of Storm Prediction Center high risk days

== Sources ==
- Agee, Ernest M.; Childs, Samuel (June 1, 2014). "Adjustments in Tornado Counts, F-Scale Intensity, and Path Width for Assessing Significant Tornado Destruction". Journal of Applied Meteorology and Climatology. 53 (6). American Meteorological Society: 1494–1505. doi:10.1175/JAMC-D-13-0235.1.
- Brooks, Harold E. (April 2004). "On the Relationship of Tornado Path Length and Width to Intensity". Weather and Forecasting. 19 (2): 310–19. Bibcode:2004WtFor..19..310B. doi:10.1175/1520-0434(2004)019<0310:OTROTP>2.0.CO;2.
- Cook, A. R.; Schaefer, J. T. (August 2008). "The Relation of El Niño–Southern Oscillation (ENSO) to Winter Tornado Outbreaks". Monthly Weather Review. 136 (8): 3121–3137. Bibcode:2008MWRv..136.3121C. doi:10.1175/2007MWR2171.1.
- Edwards, Roger; LaDue, James G.; Ferree, John T.; Scharfenberg, Kevin; Maier, Chris; Coulbourne, William L. (May 1, 2013). "Tornado Intensity Estimation: Past, Present, and Future". Bulletin of the American Meteorological Society. 94 (5). American Meteorological Society: 641–653. doi:10.1175/BAMS-D-11-00006.1.
- Ferguson, Edward W.; Schaefer, Joseph T.; Weiss, Steven J.; Wilson, Larry F.; Ostby, Frederick P. (1983). "Tornado 1982: A Near-Record Year". Monthly Weather Review. 111 (8): 1665–1678. Bibcode:1983MWRv..111.1665F. doi:10.1175/1520-0493(1983)111<1665:TANRY>2.0.CO;2. ISSN 1520-0493.
- Grazulis, Thomas P. (May 1984). Violent Tornado Climatography, 1880–1982. OSTI (Technical report). NUREG. Washington, D.C.: Nuclear Regulatory Commission. OSTI 7099491. CR-3670.
  - — (November 1990). Significant Tornadoes 1880–1989. Vol. 2. St. Johnsbury, Vermont: The Tornado Project of Environmental Films. ISBN 1-879362-02-3.
  - — (July 1993). Significant Tornadoes 1680–1991: A Chronology and Analysis of Events. St. Johnsbury, Vermont: The Tornado Project of Environmental Films. ISBN 1-879362-03-1.
  - — (2001a). The Tornado: Nature's Ultimate Windstorm. Norman: University of Oklahoma Press. ISBN 978-0-8061-3538-0.
  - — (2001b). F5-F6 Tornadoes. St. Johnsbury, Vermont: The Tornado Project of Environmental Films.
- Hagemeyer, Bartlett C. (September 1997). "Peninsular Florida Tornado Outbreaks". Weather and Forecasting. 12 (3). Boston: American Meteorological Society: 399–427. Bibcode:1997WtFor..12..399H. doi:10.1175/1520-0434(1997)012<0399:PFTO>2.0.CO;2.
- National Weather Service (April 1982). "Storm Data and Unusual Weather Phenomena". Storm Data. 24 (4). Asheville, North Carolina: National Climatic Data Center.
  - Fujita, Ted, ed. (April 1982). "Tornado Outbreak of April 2, 1982". Outstanding Storms of the Month. Storm Data. 24 (4). Asheville, North Carolina: National Climatic Data Center: 4–8.
- National Weather Service (April 1982). Storm Data Publication (Report). National Centers for Environmental Information – via Storm Events Database.
