= Oklahoma State Highway 93 =

State highway in Oklahoma, United States

State Highway 93

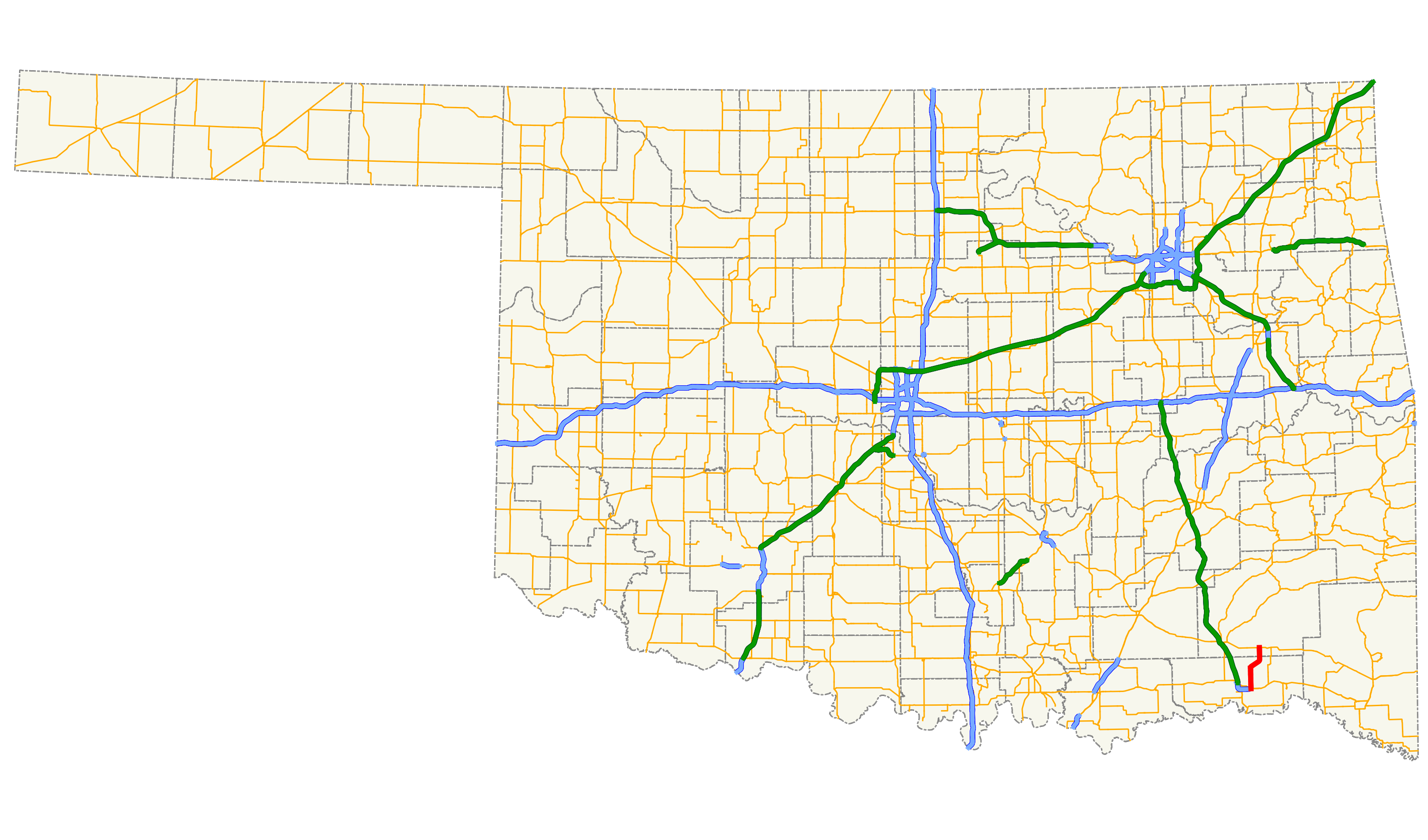

Route information
- Maintained by ODOT
- Length: 15.65 mi (25.19 km)

Major junctions
- South end: US 70 east of Hugo
- North end: SH-3 in Rattan

Location
- Country: United States
- State: Oklahoma

Highway system
- Oklahoma State Highway System; Interstate; US; State; Turnpikes
← SH-92	→ SH-94

State Highway 93 (abbreviated SH-93) is a state highway in the U.S. state of Oklahoma. It runs north–south for 15.65 miles (25.19 km) in southeastern Oklahoma. SH-93 has no lettered spur routes.

== Route description ==
SH-93 begins at US-70 between Hugo and the unincorporated community of Fallon. It runs north to Messer, where it turns more northeast and crosses Hugo Lake. It then runs west of Apple before crossing into Pushmataha County. It ends at State Highway 3 just west of Rattan.

== Junction list ==
County	Location	mi	km	Destinations	Notes
Choctaw	Hugo	0.00	0.00	US 70	Southern terminus
Pushmataha	Rattan	15.65	25.19	SH-3	Northern terminus
1.000 mi = 1.609 km; 1.000 km = 0.621 mi
