= Nelson, Oklahoma =

Unincorporated community in Oklahoma, US

- Unincorporated community
- Location within the state of Oklahoma Nelson (the United States)
- Coordinates: 34°07′38″N 95°41′07″W
- Country: United States
- State: Oklahoma
- County: Choctaw
- Time zone: UTC-6 (Central (CST))
  - Summer (DST): UTC-5 (CDT)
- GNIS feature ID: 1100669

Nelson is an unincorporated community in northwestern Choctaw County, Oklahoma, United States. It is six miles north of Soper.

Spencer Academy, a Choctaw Nation school, was moved here from Spencerville. A United States Post Office was established at Nelson, Indian Territory on March 10, 1881, and operated until November 30, 1954. Until September 15, 1881, the official name of this post office was Nelsons. Nelson is named for Cole E. Nelson, prominent Choctaw Indian and National Attorney of the Choctaw Nation.

Until the advent of Oklahoma's statehood Nelson was located in Kiamitia County (Kiamichi County), a part of the Apukshunnubbee District of the Choctaw Nation.

Nelson's livelihood as a commercial and population center was threatened after the St. Louis and San Francisco Railway built its tracks east of Nelson, passing instead through the communities of Antlers, Hamden, Speer and Hugo. Although it retained a lively community for decades following the railroad's construction in the 1880s, the towns along the railroad sapped it of potential commercial success.

Nelson continues to be home to several families, and as such remains the area's oldest settlement.
