= Swink, Oklahoma =

Unincorporated community in Oklahoma, US

- Census-designated place
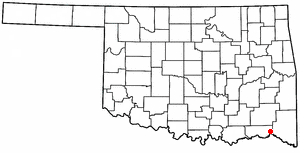
- Location of Swink, Oklahoma
- Coordinates: 34°01′01″N 95°12′06″W
- Country: United States
- State: Oklahoma
- County: Choctaw

Area
  - Total: 0.27 sq mi (0.69 km^{2})
  - Land: 0.26 sq mi (0.68 km^{2})
  - Water: 0.0039 sq mi (0.01 km^{2})
- Elevation: 482 ft (147 m)

Population (2020)
  - Total: 65
  - Density: 248.0/sq mi (95.74/km^{2})
- Time zone: UTC-6 (Central (CST))
  - Summer (DST): UTC-5 (CDT)
- ZIP code: 74761
- Area code: 580
- FIPS code: 40-71950
- GNIS feature ID: 2629936

Swink is an unincorporated community and census-designated place (CDP) in Choctaw County, Oklahoma, United States. As of the 2020 census, Swink had a population of 65. The population was 83 at the 2000 census, at which time it was a town; the community disincorporated on December 1, 2000.

== History ==
A post office was established at Swink, Indian Territory on August 14, 1902. It was named for D.R. Swink, a local merchant. At the time of its founding, Swink was located in Kiamitia County, a part of the Apukshunnubbee District of the Choctaw Nation.

Swink is the location of the historic District Choctaw Chief's House, which was the home of District Choctaw Chief Thomas LeFlore. The house was built in 1837 and is the oldest house in the state of Oklahoma that remains on its original site. The house is on the National Register of Historic Places.

== Geography ==
Swink is located in eastern Choctaw County. U.S. Route 70 passes along the northern edge of the community, leading west 19 miles (31 km) to Hugo, the county seat, and east 6 miles (10 km) to Valliant.

According to the United States Census Bureau, the Swink CDP has an area of 0.23 square miles (0.6 km^{2}), all land.

== Demographics ==
Historical population
Census	Pop.	Note	%±
2020	65		—
U.S. Decennial Census

=== 2020 census ===
As of the 2020 census, Swink had a population of 65. The median age was 40.4 years. 20.0% of residents were under the age of 18 and 10.8% of residents were 65 years of age or older. For every 100 females there were 75.7 males, and for every 100 females age 18 and over there were 79.3 males age 18 and over.

0.0% of residents lived in urban areas, while 100.0% lived in rural areas.

There were 33 households in Swink, of which 33.3% had children under the age of 18 living in them. Of all households, 66.7% were married-couple households, 21.2% were households with a male householder and no spouse or partner present, and 6.1% were households with a female householder and no spouse or partner present. About 12.1% of all households were made up of individuals and 3.0% had someone living alone who was 65 years of age or older.

There were 39 housing units, of which 15.4% were vacant. The homeowner vacancy rate was 0.0% and the rental vacancy rate was 33.3%.

Racial composition as of the 2020 census
Race	Number	Percent
White	47	72.3%
Black or African American	0	0.0%
American Indian and Alaska Native	8	12.3%
Asian	0	0.0%
Native Hawaiian and Other Pacific Islander	0	0.0%
Some other race	1	1.5%
Two or more races	9	13.8%
Hispanic or Latino (of any race)	2	3.1%

=== 2010 census ===
As of the 2010 United States census, there were 66 people, 36 households, and 20 families residing in the community. There were 54 housing units. The racial makeup of the town was 92.4% White, 1.5% Native American, and 6.1% from two or more races. Hispanic or Latino of any race were 1.5% of the population.

There were 36 households, out of which 11.1% had children under the age of 18 living with them, 41.7% were married couples living together, 5.6% had a female householder with no husband present, and 44.4% were non-families. 38.9% of all households were made up of individuals, and 22.3% had someone living alone who was 65 years of age or older. The average household size was 1.83 and the average family size was 2.30.

In the town the population was spread out, with 7.6% under the age of 18, 4.5% from 18 to 24, 16.5% from 25 to 44, 31.8% from 45 to 64, and 39.4% who were 65 years of age or older. The median age was 54.5 years. For every 100 females, there were 94.1 males. For every 100 females age 18 and over, there were 96.8 males.

=== 2013 American Community Survey ===
According to the 2013 American Community Survey, The median income for a household in the town was $21,875, and the median income for a family was $21,042. Males had a median income of $105,313, and there were not enough sample observations to calculate a median income for females. The per capita income for the community was $21,206. There were 17.6% of families and 18.5% of the population living below the poverty line, including 33.3% of those under the age of 18 and 4.8% of those 65 years of age or older.

== Steamboat Heroine ==
Near Swink was the discovery of Oklahoma's only steamboat wreck. The steamboat Heroine sank in the Red River on May 7, 1838, after hitting a submerged snag. The Red River changed course in the early 1840s, leaving the Heroine buried in what became a pasture. In the 1990s during a period of flood, the river moved again and Heroine reappeared in a riverbank. In 1999 the Oklahoma Historical Society and the Institute of Nautical Archaeology at Texas A&M University collaborated on a dig of the site. The excavation occurred between 2001 and 2008. Reconstructed segments of the boat and its machinery, along with artifacts from the wreck, are now in the Oklahoma History Center in Oklahoma City.
