= Pushmataha County, Sequoyah =

Proposed U.S. political subdivision

Pushmataha County was a proposed political subdivision created by the Sequoyah Constitutional Convention. The convention, meeting in Muskogee, Indian Territory in 1905, established the political and administrative layout of a prospective U.S. state it called the State of Sequoyah.

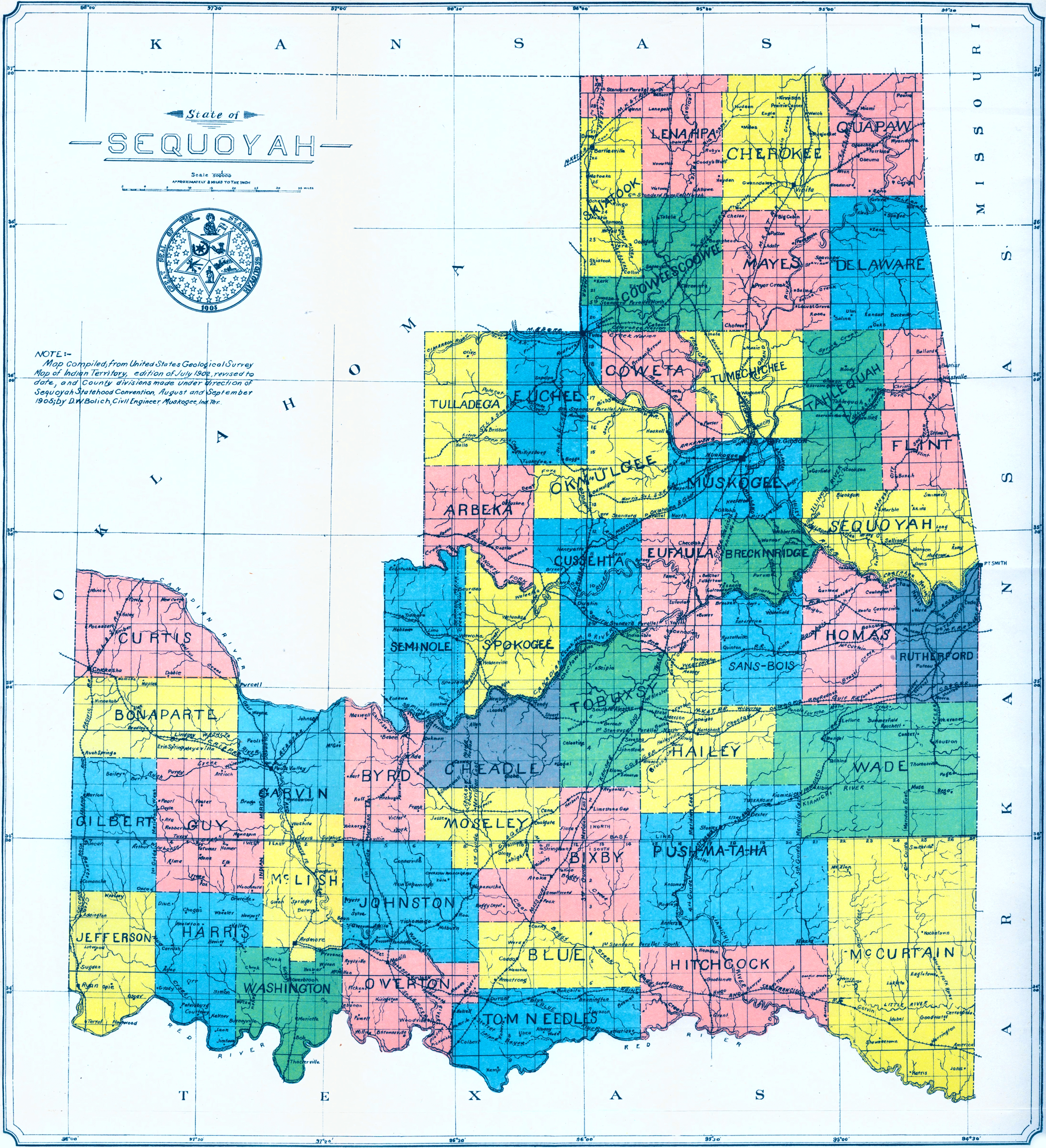
The State of Sequoyah's proposed boundaries.

Sequoyah was an attempt by the Five Civilized Tribes and others in the Indian Territory—who did not wish to be incorporated into an American state—to establish full statehood for the territory. Although their attempt to achieve statehood was unsuccessful, many of their deliberations in establishing proposed counties proved useful to the framers of Oklahoma, who met just two years later for the purpose of establishing the State of Oklahoma.

The boundaries of modern-day Choctaw, Pushmataha and McCurtain counties in Oklahoma are derived largely from the work of the Sequoyah Constitutional Convention.

== The First Pushmataha County ==
The revered Choctaw Indian warrior and statesman Chief Pushmataha, namesake of the Pushmataha District in the Choctaw Nation, was similarly honored by the framers of Sequoyah, who designated a county in his honor. Neighboring counties were to be named for territorial and U.S. officials, including Bixby County for Tams Bixby (contiguous with today’s Atoka County, Oklahoma) and Hitchcock County for Ethan Allan Hitchcock (contiguous with today’s Choctaw County, Oklahoma).

Sequoyah’s framers drew county boundaries to respond to the Public Land Survey System established by the American government for the Indian Territory. With its orderly grid of townships and ranges, it was deemed well-suited for the demands of a modern society. The Choctaw Nation’s counties, while drawn with great thought and using recognizable, logical landmarks as their county borders, would not be economically viable after statehood. Some counties, such as Cedar County, did not include towns of any size or significance, and would be bereft of any means of raising local taxes or revenue.

The issue of establishing county seats was an important one. Prior to and after Oklahoma’s statehood in 1907 the issue would consume several counties, mostly in the western part of the state, in which leading towns battled for legal supremacy. In the case of the proposed Pushmataha County, Sequoyah however, its future leaders agreed to designate the area’s most important and promising town as seat of government.

Pushmataha County, Sequoyah with Antlers as its county seat, was proposed, in general, to assume the territory then encompassed by portions of Jack’s Fork County, Cedar County, Kiamitia County (Kiamichi County) and Wade County of the Choctaw Nation.

The southeastern region of the proposed State of Sequoyah, like that of the State of Oklahoma which followed, presented special problems. The Kiamichi Mountains then, as now, occupy vast areas making population centers virtually impossible to achieve. Pushmataha County, Sequoyah was drawn with its principal commercial center—Antlers—in its southeastern corner. This was necessary to balance the competing needs of merchants in Antlers, Hugo, Atoka and other towns, as well as revenues projected to be obtained by the future county governments.

This was not an ideal arrangement as it required certain residents of the far-flung county to have to travel by train to reach their county seat. But no other arrangement appeared viable. Very logically, the town of Albion was drawn outside the county borders, grouped with Talihina, Wilburton and Poteau in a neighboring county to be called Wade County. Several years later, as Oklahoma was created, this situation was reversed and Albion was added to what is now Pushmataha County, Oklahoma.

== The Second Pushmataha County ==
The usefulness of these arrangements did not escape the attention of Oklahoma’s framers, who in 1907 borrowed, largely intact, the concept and proposed boundaries of Pushmataha County, Hitchcock County, and McCurtain County for present-day Pushmataha County, Choctaw County and McCurtain County.

County seats stayed as designated by the framers of Sequoyah, and county boundaries stayed generally the same. In the case of Pushmataha County only two differences may be noted: Albion and its surrounding townships and ranges were added; and Daisy and its surrounding townships and ranges were removed.

The recorded minutes of the Sequoyah Constitutional Convention’s committee on counties have been lost, so no additional information on the proposed Pushmataha County is available.
