= Apple, Oklahoma =

Unincorporated community in Oklahoma, US

- Unincorporated community
- Location within the state of Oklahoma Apple (the United States)
- Coordinates: 34°07′39″N 95°25′03″W
- Country: United States
- State: Oklahoma
- County: Choctaw
- Time zone: UTC-6 (Central (CST))
  - Summer (DST): UTC-5 (CDT)
- GNIS feature ID: 1100180

Apple is an unincorporated community located near Hugo Lake and State Highway 93 in Choctaw County, Oklahoma, United States.
