= Messer, Oklahoma =

Unincorporated community in Oklahoma, US

- Unincorporated community
- Location within the state of Oklahoma Messer (the United States)
- Coordinates: 34°05′14″N 95°28′10″W
- Country: United States
- State: Oklahoma
- County: Choctaw
- Time zone: UTC-6 (Central (CST))
  - Summer (DST): UTC-5 (CDT)
- GNIS feature ID: 1100629

Messer is an unincorporated community located on State Highway 93 in Choctaw County, Oklahoma, United States.

A post office was established at Messer, Indian Territory on January 4, 1907. It closed on February 29, 1916. At the time of its founding, Messer was located in Kiamitia County, a part of the Apukshunnubbee District of the Choctaw Nation.
