= Sawyer, Oklahoma =

Town in Oklahoma, US

- Town
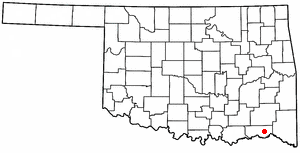
- Location of Sawyer, Oklahoma
- Coordinates: 34°01′37″N 95°22′40″W
- Country: United States
- State: Oklahoma
- County: Choctaw

Area
  - Total: 8.66 sq mi (22.43 km^{2})
  - Land: 8.57 sq mi (22.20 km^{2})
  - Water: 0.089 sq mi (0.23 km^{2})
- Elevation: 440 ft (130 m)

Population (2020)
  - Total: 340
  - Density: 39.7/sq mi (15.31/km^{2})
- Time zone: UTC-6 (Central (CST))
  - Summer (DST): UTC-5 (CDT)
- ZIP code: 74756
- Area code: 580
- FIPS code: 40-65650
- GNIS feature ID: 2413264

Sawyer is a town in Choctaw County, Oklahoma, United States. As of the 2020 census, Sawyer had a population of 340.

== History ==
Sawyer was located in Kiamitia County, one of the constituent counties comprising the Apukshunnubbee District of the Choctaw Nation. On November 4, 2022, a violent EF4 tornado passed just east of Sawyer.

== Geography ==
Sawyer is located in eastern Choctaw County at 34°0′46″N 95°22′20″W (34.012880, -95.372138). The town center is on the east side of the Kiamichi River at Hugo Dam. The town limits extend north up the east side of Hugo Lake and west to touch the southwest side of the lake.

U.S. Route 70 passes through the town, leading west 8 miles (13 km) to the city of Hugo, the Choctaw County seat, and east 6 miles (10 km) to Fort Towson.

According to the United States Census Bureau, the town of Sawyer has a total area of 8.8 square miles (22.7 km^{2}), of which 8.6 square miles (22.4 km^{2}) is land and 0.12 square miles (0.3 km^{2}), or 1.13%, is water.

== Demographics ==
Historical population
Census	Pop.	Note	%±
2000	274		—
2010	321		17.2%
2020	340		5.9%
U.S. Decennial Census

=== 2020 census ===
As of the 2020 census, Sawyer had a population of 340. The median age was 50.3 years. 18.8% of residents were under the age of 18 and 19.7% of residents were 65 years of age or older. For every 100 females there were 112.5 males, and for every 100 females age 18 and over there were 114.0 males age 18 and over.

0.0% of residents lived in urban areas, while 100.0% lived in rural areas.

There were 145 households in Sawyer, of which 34.5% had children under the age of 18 living in them. Of all households, 51.7% were married-couple households, 22.8% were households with a male householder and no spouse or partner present, and 18.6% were households with a female householder and no spouse or partner present. About 22.8% of all households were made up of individuals and 10.3% had someone living alone who was 65 years of age or older.

There were 170 housing units, of which 14.7% were vacant. The homeowner vacancy rate was 0.8% and the rental vacancy rate was 6.7%.

Racial composition as of the 2020 census
Race	Number	Percent
White	238	70.0%
Black or African American	1	0.3%
American Indian and Alaska Native	58	17.1%
Asian	0	0.0%
Native Hawaiian and Other Pacific Islander	0	0.0%
Some other race	7	2.1%
Two or more races	36	10.6%
Hispanic or Latino (of any race)	3	0.9%

=== 2000 census ===
As of the 2000 census, there were 274 people, 115 households, and 80 families residing in the town. The population density was 59.0 inhabitants per square mile (22.8/km^{2}). There were 127 housing units at an average density of 27.4 per square mile (10.6/km^{2}). The racial makeup of the town was 76.28% White, 0.36% African American, 17.15% Native American, 0.73% from other races, and 5.47% from two or more races. Hispanic or Latino of any race were 1.46% of the population.

There were 115 households, out of which 27.0% had children under the age of 18 living with them, 61.7% were married couples living together, 6.1% had a female householder with no husband present, and 29.6% were non-families. 25.2% of all households were made up of individuals, and 7.8% had someone living alone who was 65 years of age or older. The average household size was 2.38 and the average family size was 2.89.

In the town, the population was spread out, with 24.8% under the age of 18, 5.1% from 18 to 24, 29.6% from 25 to 44, 27.4% from 45 to 64, and 13.1% who were 65 years of age or older. The median age was 39 years. For every 100 females, there were 97.1 males. For every 100 females age 18 and over, there were 100.0 males.

The median income for a household in the town was $24,375, and the median income for a family was $29,688. Males had a median income of $26,071 versus $19,375 for females. The per capita income for the town was $11,874. About 16.0% of families and 24.9% of the population were below the poverty line, including 24.7% of those under the age of eighteen and 60.9% of those 65 or over.
