= Donald Fixico =

Native American writer and intellectual

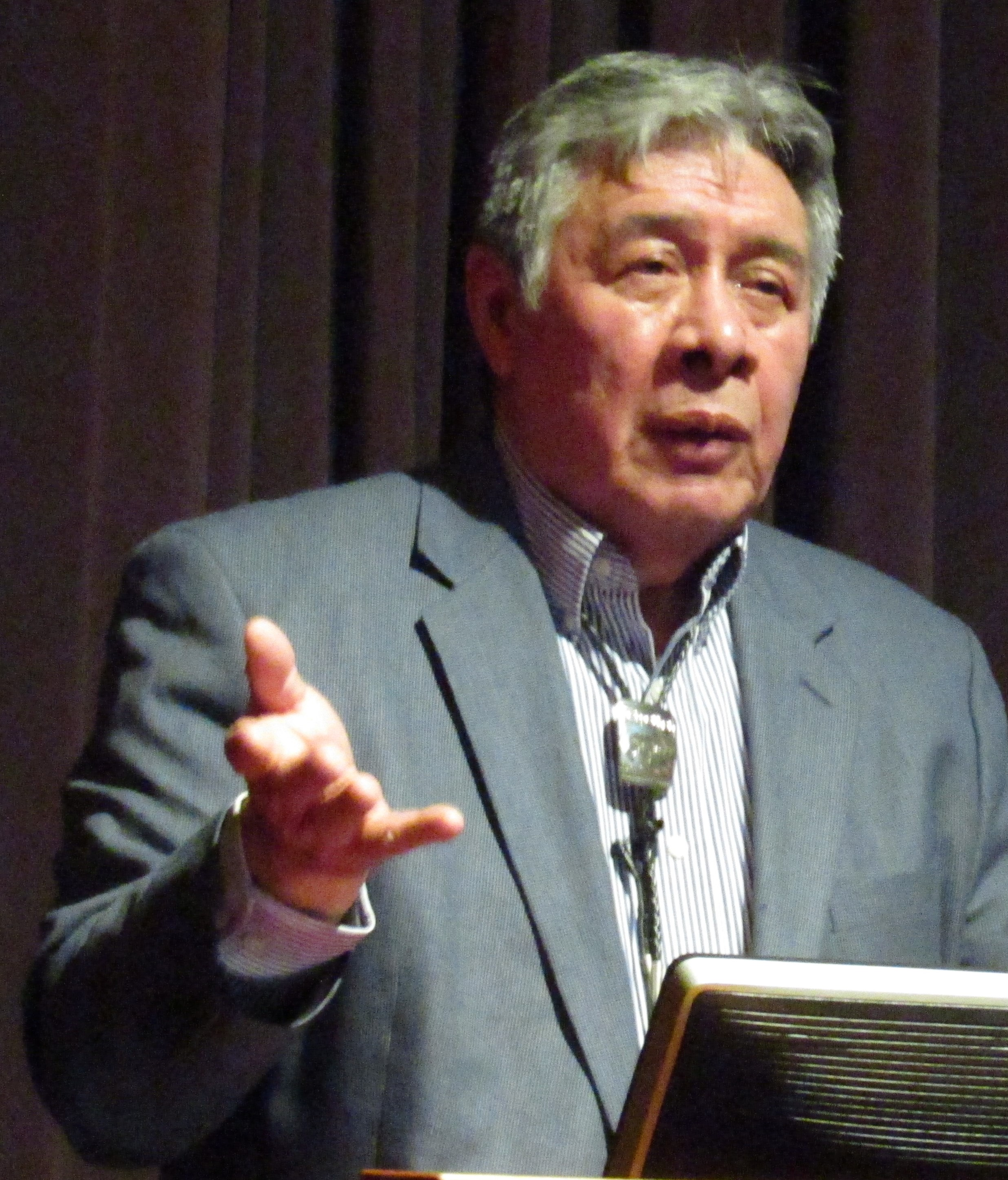
- Born: c. 1966
- Occupations: Writer, intellectual
- Writing career
- Genre: Native American intellectualism
- Notable works: Termination and Relocation: Federal Indian Policy, 1945-1960; Urban Indians, Rethinking American Indian History; The Invasion of Indian Country in the Twentieth Century: Tribal Natural Resources and American Capitalism; The Urban Indian Experience in America; The American Indian Mind in a Linear World and Daily Life of Native Americans in the Twentieth Century
- Movement: Indigenous Nationalism

Donald Fixico is a Native American writer and intellectual. He is a Regents' and Distinguished Foundation Professor of History at Arizona State University. Previously, he was the Thomas Bowlus Distinguished Professor of American Indian History, CLAS Scholar and the founding Director of the Center for Indigenous Nations Studies at the University of Kansas.

He is a policy historian and ethno-historian.

== Background ==
Fixico is an enrolled member of the Sac & Fox Nation and is Shawnee, Muscogee, and Seminole.

== Education ==
Postdoctoral Fellowship, Newberry Library, Chicago, 1981-1982

Postdoctoral Fellowship, University of California-Los Angeles, 1980-1981

Ph.D. History, University of Oklahoma, 1980. Dissertation: “Termination and Relocation, Federal Indian Policy in the 1950s”

M.A. History, University of Oklahoma, Norman 1976. Thesis: “The Seminole Wars: A Study of Indian Nationalism”

B.A. History, University of Oklahoma, Norman 1974

Bacone Junior College, Muskogee, Oklahoma, 1969-1970

== Career ==
In 2000, President Bill Clinton appointed him to the advisory council of the National Endowment for the Humanities, and in 2002 he was the John Rhodes Visiting professor of public policy in the Barrett, The Honors College at Arizona State University. In 2006, the Organization of American Historians awarded a short-term residency award to Fixico to give lectures for two weeks in Japan. Fixico has given lectures nationally and internationally and works with tribes and indigenous organizations. In 2012, he lectured at Sichuan University in China and University of Auckland in New Zealand in 2013. Fixico has been a visiting lecturer and visiting professor at University of California, Berkeley, UCLA, San Diego State University, and University of Michigan. He was an exchange professor at University of Nottingham, England and visiting professor in the F. Kennedy Institute at the Free University of Berlin.

== Works ==
=== Themes ===
Fixico writes most on the Native American experience and history, especially in oral history and the U.S. West.

He writes in depth and often about urbanization, particularly in conjunction with termination narratives and the American Indian diaspora. In his book Urban Indian Experience in America, Fixico discusses prior negative stereotypes about adjustment:

This downtrodden image does not accurately portray urban Indians, particularly in the 1990s when at least three generations have survived the relocation years of the 1950s and 1960s. The early image misrepresents the urban Indian population to an unfortunate degree, since many Indian citizens in cities hold professional positions and are members of the middle class in America." (p. 27).

Said of Fixico:

Donald Fixico challenges scholars of American and Indian history to revise their thinking, enlarge their ‘seeing,’ and engage in an effort to understand Native people and their communities. He constructs a convincing argument about the uniqueness of Indian history and his explanation for seeing the world through Indian lenses leads Fixico to craft a terminology that makes a great deal of sense. — Margaret Connell Szasz, Regents Professor of Native American and Celtic History at the University of New Mexico and author of Scottish Highlanders and Native Americans: Indigenous Education in the Eighteenth-Century Atlantic World

=== Books and contributions ===
He has published twenty books with some listed here:

- American Indians in a Modern World (2008)
- Treaties with American Indians: An Encyclopedia of Rights, Conflicts and Sovereignty, 3 volumes, ed, (2007)
- Daily Life of Native Americans in the Twentieth Century (2006)
- The American Indian Mind in a Linear World: American Indian Studies and Traditional Knowledge (2003)
- The Urban Indian Experience in America (2000)
- The Invasion of Indian Country in the Twentieth Century: Tribal Natural Resources and American Capitalism (1998), 2nd ed., 2011
- Rethinking American Indian History, ed. (1997)
- Urban Indians (1991)
- An Anthology of Western Great Lakes Indian History, ed. (1988)
- Termination and Relocation: Federal Indian Policy, 1945-1960 (1986)
- Call for Change: The Medicine Way of American Indian History, Ethos and Reality (June 2013)
- Indian Resilience and Rebuilding: Indigenous Nations in the Modern American West (October 2013).
- The State of Sequoyah: Indigenous Sovereignty and the Quest for an Indian State (October 2024).

He also has contributed to a number of publications, including "Removal of the Western Southeast Indians". Handbook of North American Indians: Southeast, Volume 14. U.S. Government Printing (2004); Witness of Change Over Fifty Years of Indian Activism and Tribal Politics. BEYOND RED POWER: TRIBAL POLITICS IN THE 1960S. School for Advanced Research Press (2007); The Federal Indian Relocation Programme of the 1950s and the Urbanization of Indian Identity. Removing Peoples: Forced Removal in the Modern World. Oxford University Press (2009); The Literature of American Indian History. A Century of American Historiography. Bedford St. Martins Press(2009); "From Tribal to Indian: American Indian Identity in the Twentieth Century". Native Diasporas: Indigenous Identities and Settler Colonialism in the Americas. University of Nebraska Press (2014).

=== Film ===
Professor Fixico has worked on more than 25 historical documentaries, including Texas Ranch House (2006), Freedom Riders (2009) and American Experience (1988).

== See also ==
- List of writers from peoples indigenous to the Americas
- Native American Renaissance
- Native American studies

== External links and further reading ==
- Donald Fixico at the Internet Speculative Fiction Database
- Interviews: Interview: Native Americans | American Experience | PBS
