= Hitchcock County, Sequoyah =

Hitchcock County was a proposed political subdivision created by the Sequoyah Constitutional Convention. The convention, meeting in Muskogee, Indian Territory in 1905, established the political and administrative layout of a prospective U.S. state it called the State of Sequoyah.

Sequoyah was an attempt by the Five Civilized Tribes and others in the Indian Territory—who did not wish to be incorporated into an American state—to establish full statehood for the territory. Although their attempt to achieve statehood was unsuccessful, many of their deliberations in establishing proposed counties proved useful to the framers of Oklahoma, who met just two years later for the purpose of establishing the State of Oklahoma.

The boundaries of modern-day Choctaw, Pushmataha and McCurtain counties in Oklahoma are derived largely from the work of the Sequoyah Constitutional Convention.

Hitchcock County, with Hugo as its county seat, was proposed, in general, to take the place of Kiamitia County (Kiamichi County), Choctaw Nation, which would be abolished with the advent of Sequoyah statehood. The county was named in honor of Ethan Allen Hitchcock (1835-1909), the federal Commissioner to the Five Civilized Tribes, formerly the American minister (ambassador) to the Russian Empire.

Hitchcock County was created and sized appropriate to the economic heft of Hugo merchants, whose trade territory was to be included, more or less whole, in the new county. The usefulness of these arrangements did not escape the attention of Oklahoma's framers, who in 1907 borrowed, largely intact, the concept and proposed boundaries of Hitchcock County for Choctaw County, Oklahoma.

The recorded minutes of the Sequoyah Constitutional Convention's committee on counties have been lost, so no additional information on the proposed Hitchcock County is available.
