= Fallon, Oklahoma =

Unincorporated community in Oklahoma, US

- Unincorporated community
- Location within the state of Oklahoma Fallon (the United States)
- Coordinates: 33°59′52″N 95°25′01″W
- Country: United States
- State: Oklahoma
- County: Choctaw
- Time zone: UTC-6 (Central (CST))
  - Summer (DST): UTC-5 (CDT)
- GNIS feature ID: 1100404

Fallon is an unincorporated community in Choctaw County, Oklahoma, United States, situated along U.S. Route 70.
