= Oleta, Oklahoma =

Unincorporated community in Oklahoma, US

Coordinates: 34°11′58″N 95°20′38″W

Oleta is an unincorporated community in southeastern Pushmataha County, Oklahoma, United States. It lies 15 miles east of Antlers. According to the Public Land Survey System in use in Oklahoma it is located in S18-T4S-R19E.

A United States Post Office opened here on October 10, 1935. According to historian George H. Shirk, whose seminal work Oklahoma Place Names was published in 1965, Oleta was named for the first wife of Alvin J. Morris, a businessman in the county. However, the name of Mr. Morris' first wife was not Oleta.

According to information provided in later years by Mr. Morris to the Pushmataha County Historical Society, the community is named for area resident Oleta Ashmore.

In earlier times, the residents of an area to be served by a new U.S. Post Office were given responsibility for determining the name by which it would be known. Postal officials generally agreed to the name submitted, so long as the name was not already in use elsewhere in the state. As related by Mr. Morris, who lived nearby at the time the Oleta post office opened, the name drawn from a hat by local residents was "Oleta"—a reference to Oleta Ashmore, who was one of their number.
