= Choctaw County, Oklahoma =

County in Oklahoma, United States

- County
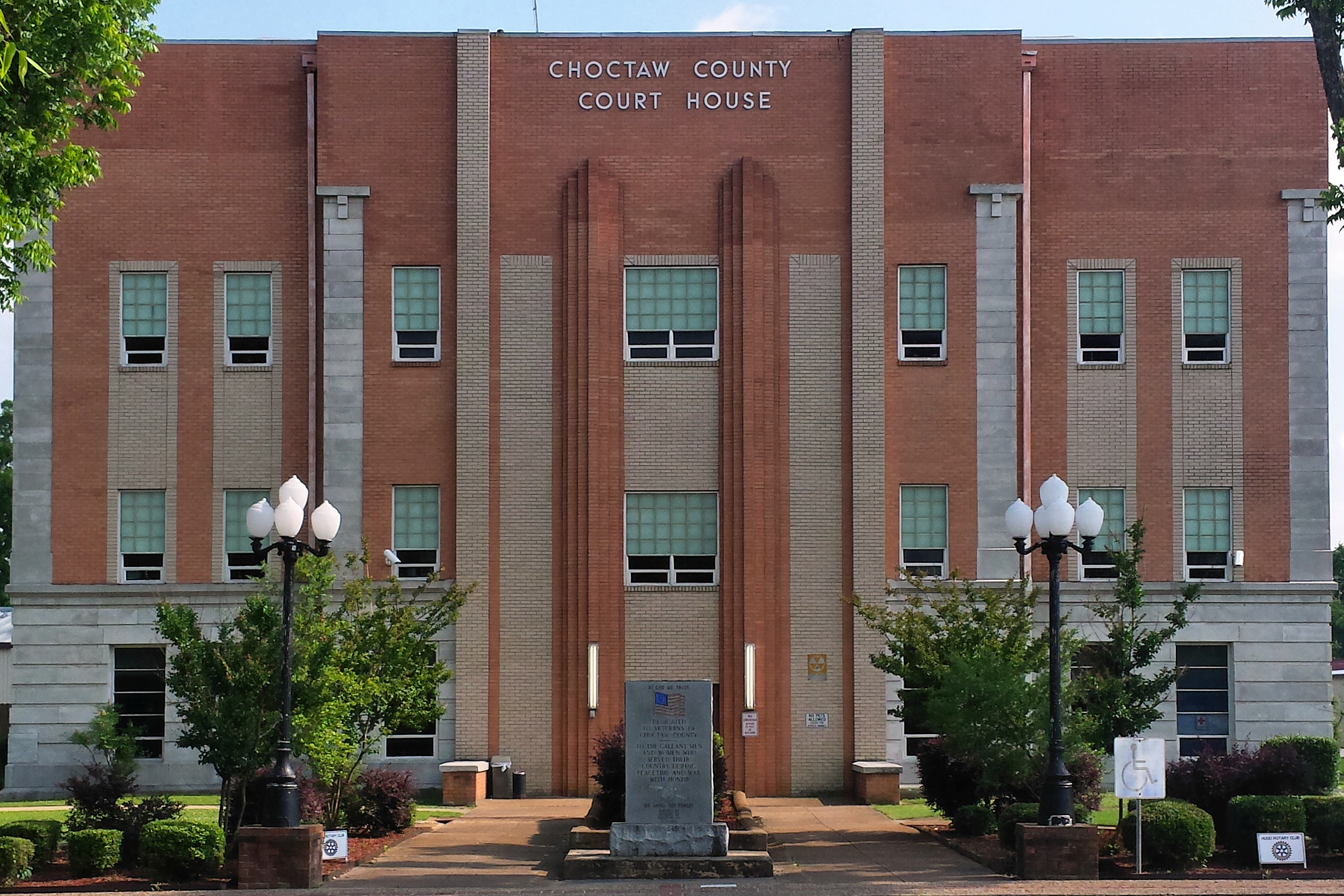
- The Choctaw County Courthouse in Hugo.

- Location within the U.S. state of Oklahoma
- Coordinates: 34°02′N 95°33′W
- Country: United States
- State: Oklahoma
- Founded: 1907
- Seat: Hugo
- Largest city: Hugo

Area
  - Total: 800 sq mi (2,100 km^{2})
  - Land: 770 sq mi (2,000 km^{2})
  - Water: 29 sq mi (75 km^{2}) 3.7%

Population (2020)
  - Total: 14,204
  - Estimate (2025): 14,059 ▼
  - Density: 18/sq mi (7.1/km^{2})
- Time zone: UTC−6 (Central)
  - Summer (DST): UTC−5 (CDT)
- Congressional district: 2nd
- Website: www.choctawcountyoklahoma.com

Choctaw County is a county located in the U.S. state of Oklahoma. As of the 2020 census, the population was 14,204. Its county seat is Hugo.

Formerly part of the Choctaw Nation in Indian Territory, this county was reorganized and redefined in 1907, at the time of Oklahoma statehood. According to the Encyclopedia of Oklahoma History and Culture, the name is derived from Chahta, the founder of the Choctaw people as according to their oral tradition. It is part of the area of jurisdiction of the Choctaw Nation of Oklahoma.

== History ==
The Choctaw Nation moved into the area now occupied by Choctaw County in 1831–1832, as a result of their forcible removal from their homeland in the Southeastern United States, under the Indian Removal Act. The US wanted to extinguish Native American land claims in the Southeast to enable development by European Americans. It offered land in exchange in Indian Territory.

The U.S. Army had already established Fort Towson in the western area in 1824, and took on the mission of protecting the newcomers from other tribes. In 1837, the Chickasaw were also removed, and settled the area around Doaksville, which was adjacent to the fort. Both the town of Fort Towson and Doaksville served as the capital of the Choctaw Nation. Doaksville became a ghost town after the Civil War. In 1848, the Presbyterian church established a mission, which still exists and is now known as Goodland Academy.

The St. Louis and San Francisco Railway built a line through the town of Hugo in 1902, stimulating commercial development of the town as a regional center. Before statehood, the area of Choctaw County was part of Jackson, Kiamichi, Cedar, and Towson counties, Choctaw Nation. It included two of the three provinces, or districts, comprising the Choctaw Nation: the Apukshunnubbee District and the Pushmataha District.

As the end of the Indian Territory drew near, tribal citizens and other inhabitants organized an effort for the territory to be admitted to the Union as a state. The State of Sequoyah, which they proposed, divided the territories of the five tribes into counties. Hugo was designated as the county seat of Hitchcock County. Although neither Congress nor the president were interested in admitting Sequoyah as a state, the county boundaries proposed for Sequoyah were in some cases adopted for counties in the future state of Oklahoma.

In southeastern Oklahoma, the future Choctaw County's boundaries were generally those of Hitchcock County, Sequoyah. Similarly, boundaries proposed for Pushmataha County, Sequoyah served, in general, as the boundaries for Pushmataha County, Oklahoma. And McCurtain County, Oklahoma generally follows the boundaries proposed for McCurtain County, Sequoyah. Both counties are adjacent to and share boundaries with Choctaw County.

When Oklahoma became a state in 1907, Choctaw County was created and Hugo was named as the county seat.

=== Recent events ===
In October 2011 the U.S. Navy announced plans to honor Choctaw County with the naming of a ship. The Joint High Speed Vessel (JHSV) will simultaneously honor the three American counties named Choctaw County, in the states of Alabama, Mississippi, and Oklahoma. "I grew up in Choctaw County, Miss., where people work hard to raise their families and provide for their children," Secretary of the Navy Ray Mabus said in announcing the plan. "I chose to name JHSV after Choctaw County to honor those men and women who represent rural America." USNS Choctaw County will bear hull number JHSV-2.

== Geography ==
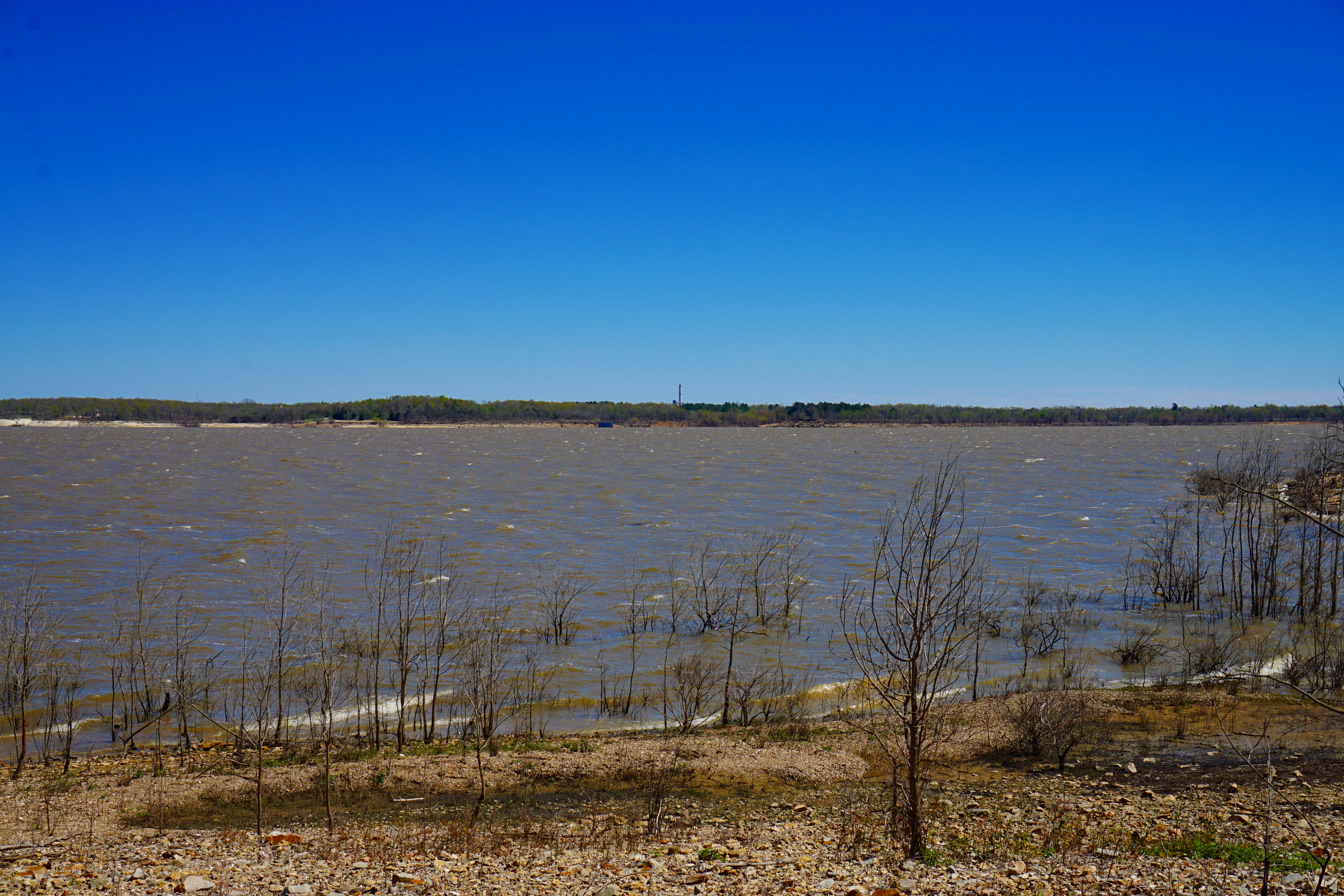
Hugo Lake

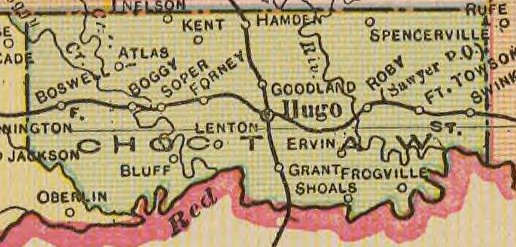
Map of Choctaw County, 1909

Choctaw County is in southeastern Oklahoma, in a 10-county area designated for tourism purposes by the Oklahoma Department of Tourism and Recreation as Choctaw Country. According to the U.S. Census Bureau, the county has a total area of 800 square miles (2,100 km^{2}), of which 770 square miles (2,000 km^{2}) is land and 29 square miles (75 km^{2}) (3.7%) is water. The major streams in the county are the Kiamichi River, the Muddy Boggy River and the Clear Boggy River, which all drain into the Red River. Lakes include Hugo Lake, on the Kiamichi River, and Raymond Gary Lake. Choctaw County is the only documented part of Oklahoma, together with McCurtain County, located within the natural range of the American alligator.

=== Major highways ===
- U.S. Highway 70
- U.S. Highway 271
- State Highway 93
- Indian Nation Turnpike

=== Adjacent counties ===
- Pushmataha County (north)
- McCurtain County (east)
- Red River County, Texas (southeast)
- Lamar County, Texas (south)
- Bryan County (west, and south)
- Atoka County (northwest)

== Demographics ==
Historical population
Census	Pop.	Note	%±
1910	21,862		—
1920	32,144		47.0%
1930	24,142		−24.9%
1940	28,358		17.5%
1950	20,405		−28.0%
1960	15,637		−23.4%
1970	15,141		−3.2%
1980	17,203		13.6%
1990	15,302		−11.1%
2000	15,342		0.3%
2010	15,205		−0.9%
2020	14,204		−6.6%
2025 (est.)	14,059	▼	−1.0%
U.S. Decennial Census; 1790-1960 1900-1990; 1990-2000 2010

=== 2020 census ===
As of the 2020 United States census, the county had a population of 14,204. Of the residents, 22.9% were under the age of 18 and 21.1% were 65 years of age or older; the median age was 43.7 years. For every 100 females there were 93.5 males, and for every 100 females age 18 and over there were 90.4 males.

The racial makeup of the county was 58.3% White, 9.7% Black or African American, 18.2% American Indian and Alaska Native, 0.2% Asian, 1.2% from some other race, and 12.3% from two or more races. Hispanic or Latino residents of any race comprised 4.2% of the population.

There were 5,963 households in the county, of which 29.0% had children under the age of 18 living with them and 30.7% had a female householder with no spouse or partner present. About 31.7% of all households were made up of individuals and 15.2% had someone living alone who was 65 years of age or older.

There were 7,066 housing units, of which 15.6% were vacant. Among occupied housing units, 67.1% were owner-occupied and 32.9% were renter-occupied. The homeowner vacancy rate was 1.7% and the rental vacancy rate was 10.9%.

=== 2000 census ===
As of the census of 2000, there were 15,342 people, 6,220 households, and 4,285 families residing in the county. The population density was 20 people per square mile (8 people/km^{2}). There were 7,539 housing units at an average density of 10 units per square mile (4/km^{2}). The racial makeup of the county was 68.55% White, 10.94% Black or African American, 14.96% Native American, 0.16% Asian, 0.02% Pacific Islander, 0.48% from other races, and 4.90% from two or more races. 1.60% of the population were Hispanic or Latino of any race. 97.1% spoke English, 1.6% Spanish and 1.3% Choctaw as their first language.

There were 6,220 households, out of which 30.00% had children under the age of 18 living with them, 51.30% were married couples living together, 14.40% had a female householder with no husband present, and 31.10% were non-families. 28.30% of all households were made up of individuals, and 14.90% had someone living alone who was 65 years of age or older. The average household size was 2.43 and the average family size was 2.96.

In the county, the population was spread out, with 26.00% under the age of 18, 7.80% from 18 to 24, 24.70% from 25 to 44, 24.10% from 45 to 64, and 17.40% who were 65 years of age or older. The median age was 39 years. For every 100 females there were 90.40 males. For every 100 females age 18 and over, there were 85.00 males.

The median income for a household in the county was $22,743, and the median income for a family was $28,331. Males had a median income of $25,777 versus $18,805 for females. The per capita income for the county was $12,296. About 20.40% of families and 24.30% of the population were below the poverty line, including 32.50% of those under age 18 and 21.70% of those age 65 or over.

== Life expectancy and health ==
Of 3,142 counties in the United States in 2014, the Institute for Health Metrics and Evaluation ranked Choctaw County 2,992 in the average life expectancy at birth of male residents and 3,081 in the life expectancy of female residents, among the lowest life expectancies of Oklahoma counties and among the lowest life expectancy for all counties. Males in Choctaw County lived an average of 70.8 years and females lived an average of 75.9 years compared to the national average for life expectancy of 76.7 for males and 81.5 for females.

In the 1980-2014 period, the average life expectancy in Choctaw County for females declined by 0.8 years while male longevity increased by 3.7 years compared to the national average for the same period of an increased life expectancy of 4.0 years for women and 6.7 years for men. Choctaw County ranked in the worst performing 10 percent of all counties. High rates of smoking and obesity for both sexes and a low level of physical activity for males appear to be contributing factors to the relatively short life expectancy.

In 2020, the Robert Wood Johnson Foundation ranked Choctaw country as last of 77 counties in Oklahoma in "health outcomes," as measured by length and quality of life.

== Politics ==
Home to a significant Native American population, the county has voted heavily Republican in every presidential election since 2004. The GOP has won well over 70% of the vote in the county in every election since 2012, and topped out at 80.6% for Donald Trump in 2020.

Voter Registration and Party Enrollment as of May 31, 2023
Party	Number of Voters	Percentage
Republican	4,300	49.66%
Democratic	3,100	35.80%
Libertarian	38	0.44%
Unaffiliated	1,221	14.10%
Total	8,659	100%

United States presidential election results for Choctaw County, Oklahoma
Year	Republican		Democratic		Third party(ies)	
Year	No.	%	No.	%	No.	%
1908	878	39.28%	1,038	46.44%	319	14.27%
1912	692	24.64%	1,392	49.56%	725	25.81%
1916	957	27.12%	1,945	55.11%	627	17.77%
1920	2,094	42.67%	2,531	51.57%	283	5.77%
1924	2,013	38.14%	2,528	47.90%	737	13.96%
1928	2,541	49.32%	2,581	50.10%	30	0.58%
1932	1,040	17.48%	4,908	82.52%	0	0.00%
1936	1,269	21.47%	4,624	78.24%	17	0.29%
1940	2,365	31.28%	5,177	68.47%	19	0.25%
1944	1,404	24.31%	4,358	75.46%	13	0.23%
1948	1,036	17.91%	4,750	82.09%	0	0.00%
1952	2,251	34.57%	4,260	65.43%	0	0.00%
1956	2,206	38.87%	3,469	61.13%	0	0.00%
1960	2,531	46.25%	2,941	53.75%	0	0.00%
1964	1,718	30.21%	3,969	69.79%	0	0.00%
1968	1,414	26.03%	2,268	41.74%	1,751	32.23%
1972	3,399	64.40%	1,798	34.07%	81	1.53%
1976	1,821	29.66%	4,269	69.53%	50	0.81%
1980	2,394	39.84%	3,507	58.36%	108	1.80%
1984	3,155	52.70%	2,801	46.78%	31	0.52%
1988	2,217	39.60%	3,362	60.05%	20	0.36%
1992	1,641	25.73%	3,413	53.52%	1,323	20.75%
1996	1,580	29.37%	3,198	59.45%	601	11.17%
2000	2,461	46.30%	2,799	52.66%	55	1.03%
2004	3,168	54.55%	2,639	45.45%	0	0.00%
2008	3,730	66.73%	1,860	33.27%	0	0.00%
2012	3,572	70.51%	1,494	29.49%	0	0.00%
2016	4,206	77.52%	1,067	19.66%	153	2.82%
2020	4,698	80.56%	1,082	18.55%	52	0.89%
2024	4,633	82.16%	944	16.74%	62	1.10%

== Economy ==
Agriculture, ranching and lumber have been the mainstays of the county economy since statehood. In 1910, cotton was the main crop. By 1930, the local agriculture industry had diversified to include corn, oats, prairie hay, and peanuts. At the start of the 21st century, soybeans, vegetables, and corn were the main crops. Retail businesses and health care were the largest employers.

== Communities ==
=== City ===
- Hugo (county seat)

=== Towns ===
- Boswell
- Fort Towson
- Sawyer
- Soper

=== Census-designated places ===
- Grant
- Swink

=== Other unincorporated places ===
- Apple
- Fallon
- Frogville
- Gay
- Hamden
- Messer
- Nelson
- Rufe
- Spencerville

== See also ==
- National Register of Historic Places listings in Choctaw County, Oklahoma
