= Spencerville, Oklahoma =

Unincorporated community in Oklahoma, US

- Unincorporated community
- Location within the state of Oklahoma Spencerville (the United States)
- Coordinates: 34°08′32″N 95°21′30″W
- Country: United States
- State: Oklahoma
- County: Choctaw
- Time zone: UTC-6 (Central (CST))
  - Summer (DST): UTC-5 (CDT)
- ZIP code: 74760
- GNIS feature ID: 1098356

Spencerville is an unincorporated community in northern Choctaw County, Oklahoma, United States. It is 12 miles northeast of Hugo, adjacent to the Pushmataha County border. The improved Ft. Smith to Ft. Towson military road of 1839 ran north–south through Spencerville after crossing the "Seven Devils" on its way southeast to Doaksville. This wagon road was heavily used by the U.S. Army from 1839 to 1848, especially during the war with Mexico.

Spencerville, named for U.S. Secretary of War John C. Spencer, was home to Spencer Academy, a Choctaw Nation boarding school for boys. The trace of the military road today serves as the access road from Spencerville 1/4 mile north to the site of old Spencer Academy. A large Oklahoma Historical Society marker identifies the site.

Spencer Academy was opened in January 1844. It was here that Negro freedman "Uncle" Wallace Willis composed “Swing Low, Sweet Chariot”. He was inspired by the Red River which reminded him of the Jordan and of the Prophet Elijah being taken to heaven by a chariot. Spencer Academy was operated on behalf of the Choctaw Indians by the Presbyterian Board of Missions.

Prior to Oklahoma's statehood Spencerville was in Towson County, Choctaw Nation—but was very close to the boundary with Cedar County. A United States post office operated at Spencerville, Indian Territory, from January 22, 1844, to July 22, 1847, and was established again on May 17, 1902. The community and its post offices took their name from the academy. The academy later relocated to Nelson, several miles to the west.
