= Soper, Oklahoma =

Town in Oklahoma, US

- Town
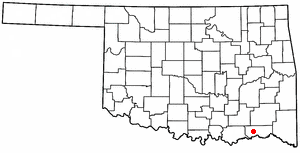
- Location of Soper, Oklahoma
- Coordinates: 34°01′55″N 95°41′48″W
- Country: United States
- State: Oklahoma
- County: Choctaw

Area
  - Total: 0.25 sq mi (0.65 km^{2})
  - Land: 0.25 sq mi (0.65 km^{2})
  - Water: 0 sq mi (0.00 km^{2})
- Elevation: 532 ft (162 m)

Population (2020)
  - Total: 225
  - Density: 897/sq mi (346.4/km^{2})
- Time zone: UTC-6 (Central (CST))
  - Summer (DST): UTC-5 (CDT)
- ZIP code: 74759
- Area code: 580
- FIPS code: 40-68500
- GNIS feature ID: 2413304

Soper is a town in Choctaw County, Oklahoma, United States. As of the 2020 census, Soper had a population of 225. The town was named for Pliny L. Soper, who was an attorney for the Arkansas and Choctaw Railway.

== History ==
At the time of its founding, Soper was located in Kiamitia County, one of the constituent counties comprising the Apukshunnubbee District of the Choctaw Nation.

== Geography ==
Soper is located in west-central Choctaw County. The town is located approximately 12 miles (19 km) west of Hugo, the county seat, and approximately 10 miles (16 km) east of Boswell.

Soper has a volunteer fire department, local gas station and market, and several prominent families who have been in the area for many years.

According to the United States Census Bureau, the town of Soper has a total area of 0.27 square miles (0.7 km^{2}), all land.

== Demographics ==
Historical population
Census	Pop.	Note	%±
1910	233		—
1920	538		130.9%
1930	417		−22.5%
1940	481		15.3%
1950	337		−29.9%
1960	309		−8.3%
1970	322		4.2%
1980	465		44.4%
1990	305		−34.4%
2000	300		−1.6%
2010	261		−13.0%
2020	225		−13.8%
U.S. Decennial Census

=== 2020 census ===
As of the 2020 census, Soper had a population of 225. The median age was 37.2 years. 26.2% of residents were under the age of 18 and 22.2% of residents were 65 years of age or older. For every 100 females there were 74.4 males, and for every 100 females age 18 and over there were 80.4 males age 18 and over.

0.0% of residents lived in urban areas, while 100.0% lived in rural areas.

There were 102 households in Soper, of which 43.1% had children under the age of 18 living in them. Of all households, 40.2% were married-couple households, 16.7% were households with a male householder and no spouse or partner present, and 34.3% were households with a female householder and no spouse or partner present. About 25.5% of all households were made up of individuals and 15.7% had someone living alone who was 65 years of age or older.

There were 123 housing units, of which 17.1% were vacant. The homeowner vacancy rate was 3.9% and the rental vacancy rate was 6.5%.

Racial composition as of the 2020 census
Race	Number	Percent
White	152	67.6%
Black or African American	2	0.9%
American Indian and Alaska Native	49	21.8%
Asian	1	0.4%
Native Hawaiian and Other Pacific Islander	0	0.0%
Some other race	0	0.0%
Two or more races	21	9.3%
Hispanic or Latino (of any race)	20	8.9%

=== 2000 census ===
As of the census of 2000, there were 600 people, 432 households, and 74 families residing in the town. The population density was 1,191.8 inhabitants per square mile (460.2/km^{2}). There were 159 housing units at an average density of 631.7 per square mile (243.9/km^{2}). The racial makeup of the town was 74.33% White, 19.33% Native American, and 6.33% from two or more races. Hispanic or Latino of any race were 0.67% of the population.

There were 132 households, out of which 29.5% had children under the age of 18, 40.2% were married couples living together, 15.2% had a female householder with no husband present, and 43.2% were nonfamilies. Of all households 41.7% were made up of individuals, and 25.0% had someone living alone who was 65 years of age or older. The average household size was 2.27, and the average family size was 3.13.

In the town, the population was spread out, with 28.3% under the age of 18, 8.3% from 18 to 24, 24.0% from 25 to 44, 20.3% from 45 to 64, and 19.0% 65 years of age or older. The median age was 36 years. For every 100 females age 18 and over, there were 73.4 males.

The median income for a household in the town was $13,875, and the median income for a family was $18,333. Males had a median income of $16,875 versus $16,000 for females. The per capita income for the town was $7,814. About 35.1% of families and 44.4% of the population were below the poverty line, including 41.5% of those under the age of 18 and 50.8% of those 65 or over.

== Education ==
Surrounding smaller communities in the area include Buckhorn, Bluff, Gay, Nelson, and Sugar Creek, most of which were small school districts, many of which still stand today, before they were closed and the students began using the Soper public school system.

The Soper High School baseball team has been in the state tournament many times, since debuting and placing runner-up in the fall of 1992, and finally winning the state championship in the spring of 2009.

== Notable people ==
- Ray Wylie Hubbard, Texas country singer and songwriter
- Freckles Brown, born Warren Granger Brown, rodeo performer known for riding the "unrideable" bull Tornado in 1967, owned and lived on a ranch near Soper.
