= State of Sequoyah =

Proposed U.S. state in what is now eastern Oklahoma

Coordinates: 35.0°N 95.5°W

- Proposed state of the United States
- 1905–1907
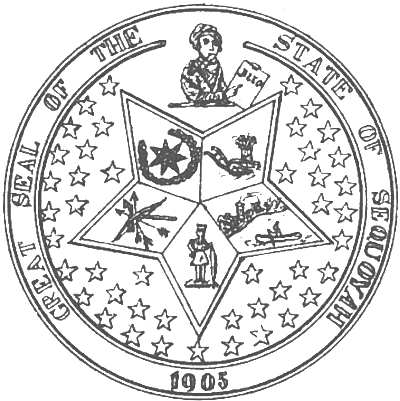
- Seal

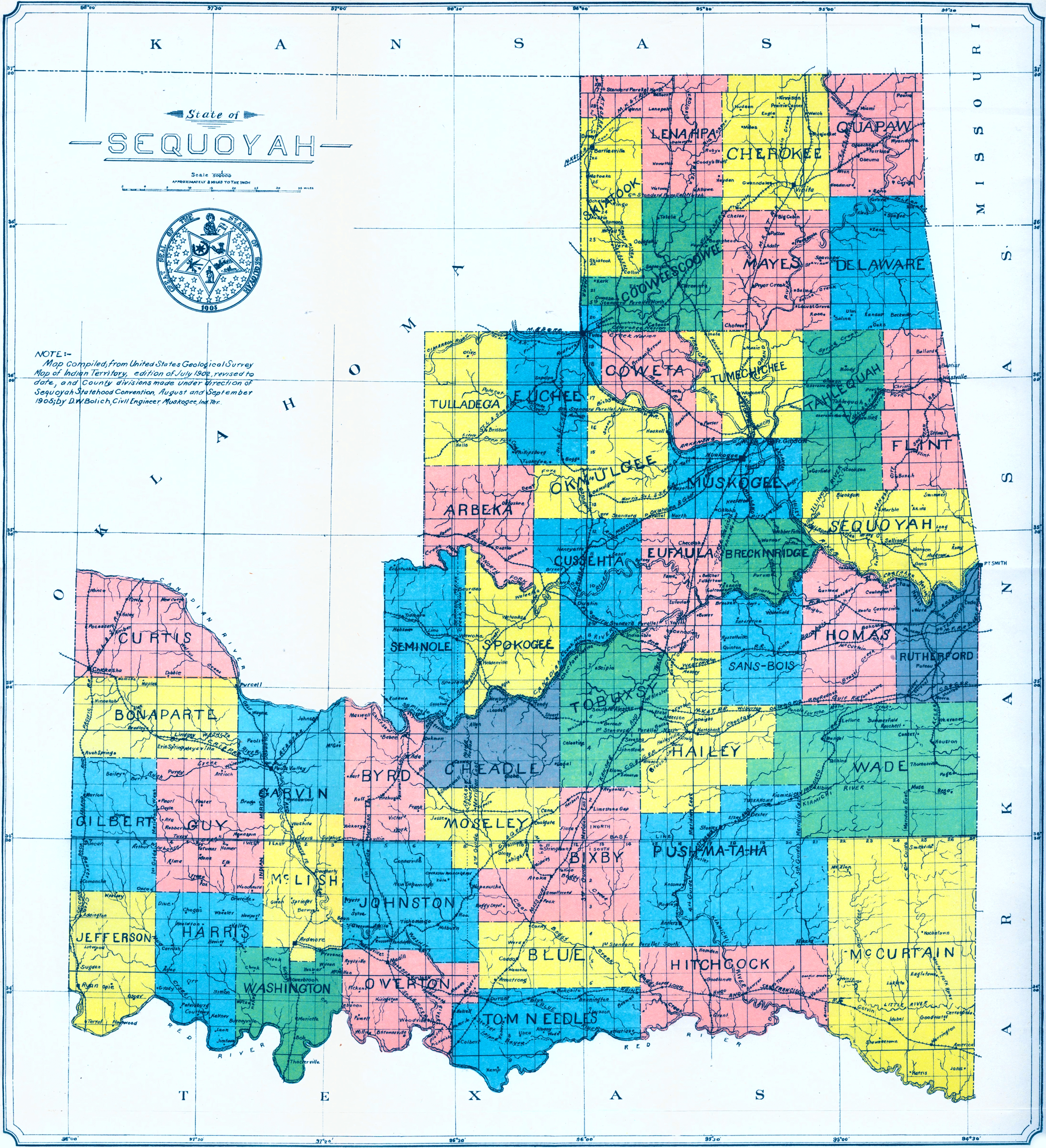
- 1905 map of Sequoyah
- Capital: Fort Gibson
- Historical era: Progressive
  - Sequoyah convention begins: August 21, 1905
  - Statehood referendum approves proposal: November 7 1905
  - Area is wholly annexed to Oklahoma before being admitted to the Union: November 16 1907
| Preceded by | Succeeded by |
| Indian Territory | United States; Oklahoma |

The State of Sequoyah was a proposed state to be established from the Indian Territory in eastern present-day Oklahoma. In 1905, with the end of tribal governments looming, Native Americans (the Cherokee, Choctaw, Chickasaw, Creek, and Seminole) in Indian Territory proposed to create a state as a means to retain control of their lands. Their intention was to have a state under Native American constitution and governance. Their efforts failed to gain support in Congress, and the territory was annexed to the United States in 1907.

== Background ==
Starting in 1890, when Congress passed the Oklahoma Organic Act, the land that now forms the State of Oklahoma was made up of two separate territories: Oklahoma Territory to the west and the Indian Territory to the east. The Indian Territory had a large Native American population. The territory had been reduced by required land cessions after the Civil War, land runs, and other treaties with the United States. In the 1900 US Census, Native Americans composed 13.4 percent of the population in the future state. By 1905, the Five Civilized Tribes comprised about 10% of the Indian Territory's total population of around 600,000 people.

Despite having been previously exempt from the 1887 General Allotment Act, the Curtis Act of 1898 allowed Congress to set a date (March 4, 1906) for the breakup of tribal governments and communal lands in the territory. Until 1903, the Five Civilized Tribes and other tribes in Indian Territory had generally opposed all local and national efforts for statehood, whether they were single or joint with Oklahoma Territory. That changed as the termination deadline approached.

== Constitutional convention ==
"It must be borne constantly in mind that there is such diversity of opinion in Congress on the question of statehood legislation for Indian Territory that it is impossible for the Indians and noncitizens here to unite on any plan acceptable to Congress. However, I express the sentiment of the great majority of the Indians of the Five Tribes when I say that we are in favor of any statehood that Congress may provide, so long as it is statehood for Indian Territory alone, independent of Oklahoma."

— Green McCurtain, 1904

"We, as Cherokee, Creek, Choctaw, Chickasaw, Seminole and Osage Indians, together with the whites and blacks in our midst, have the same equal right as American loyal citizens to call a constitutional convention this summer, to adopt a constitution for the Indian Territory's new state, called Sequoia."

— James A. Norman, 1905

The desire of tribal leaders to retain their historic authority and for the territory to be admitted as a single state, apart from Oklahoma Territory, culminated in July 1905 with the Cherokee Chief W.C. Rogers and Choctaw Chief Green McCurtain calling for a constitutional convention that August. The convention met in Muskogee, on August 21, 1905. The new state was to be named for the Cherokee statesman Sequoyah, who invented the tribe's written language. General Pleasant Porter, Principal Chief of the Creek Nation, was selected as president of the convention, while Creek journalist Alexander Posey served as Secretary. The elected delegates decided that the executive officers of the Five Civilized Tribes would also be appointed as vice-presidents of the convention. These were:

- William C. Rogers, Principal Chief of the Cherokees
- Green McCurtain, Principal Chief of the Choctaws
- John Brown, Principal Chief of the Seminoles
- Charles N. Haskell, a non-Native selected to represent the Creeks (as General Porter had been elected president)
- William H. Murray, an intermarried white appointed by Chickasaw Governor Douglas H. Johnston (who opposed the convention) to represent the Chickasaws

The convention, which met as a whole on August 21 and 22 and September 5 to 8, during which over 150 delegates drafted a constitution, drew up a plan of organization for the government, put together a map showing the counties to be established (such as Hitchcock and Pushmataha), and elected delegates to go to the United States Congress to petition for statehood, along with 2 Democrats and 2 Republicans who were to serve as congressmen. As the convention closed, Chief Porter made a final impassioned appeal for Sequoyah Statehood:

"From time immemorial, the Indians, as a heritage of the original inhabitants, have been promised a state, an Empire of their own. Driven west by successive invasions, the Indians were forced to settle in this territory, which is undoubtedly Indian Country. They have taken on the dress, the customs, and the religion of the white man, and welcomed him as a brother. The national government must grant us separate statehood, or make a confession."

Single-state supporters and Indian nation leaders pressed the campaign in the weeks leading to the November 7, 1905, election, with the legislatures of each of the Five Tribes endorsing the measure. A month before the scheduled vote, The New York Times cast doubt on the legitimacy of the election. However, on Election Day, voters in the territory approved the constitution and statehood petition by 56,279 in favor to 9,073 against. Following this success, Porter, Posey, Haskell, Murray, and the four congressmen brought the proposed constitution to Washington, D.C. to lobby for its passage. Republicans Arthur P. Murphy of Missouri and Porter James McCumber of North Dakota introduced statehood bills to the House and Senate, respectively. Murray, however, known for his eccentricities and political astuteness, predicted their efforts would fail:

"After we'd adjourned, Haskell walked to the Depot, and he said, 'Do you believe we will get statehood under this bill?' I said no. 'Why?' Because the eastern fellas don't want two new states out there, with four senators, instead of one."

Key players in the Sequoyah Convention:

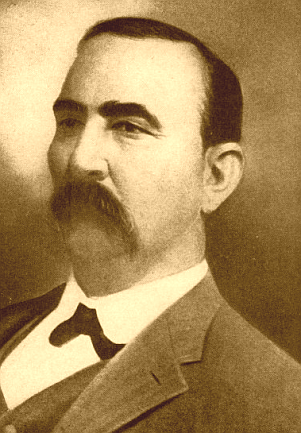
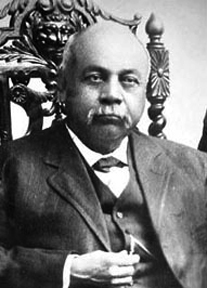
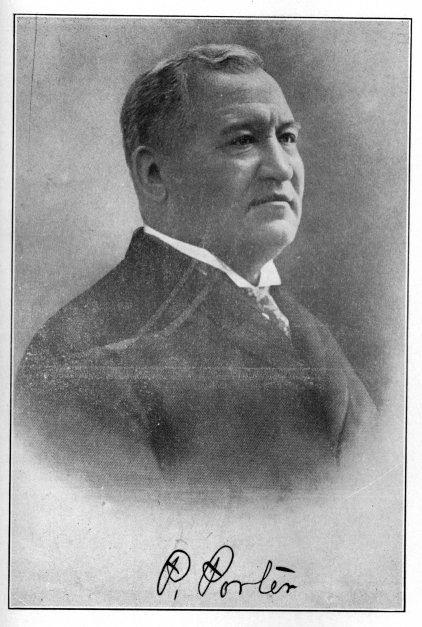
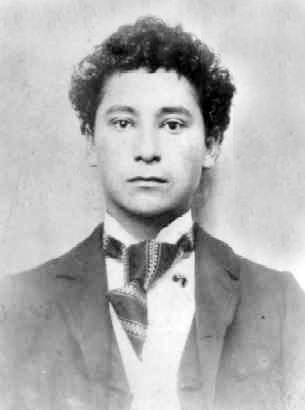
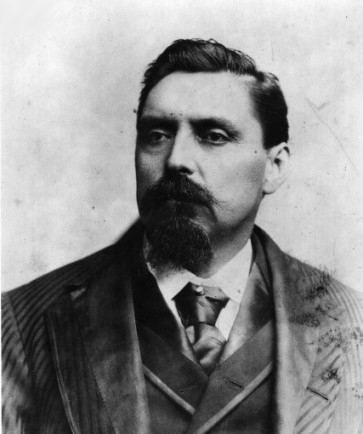
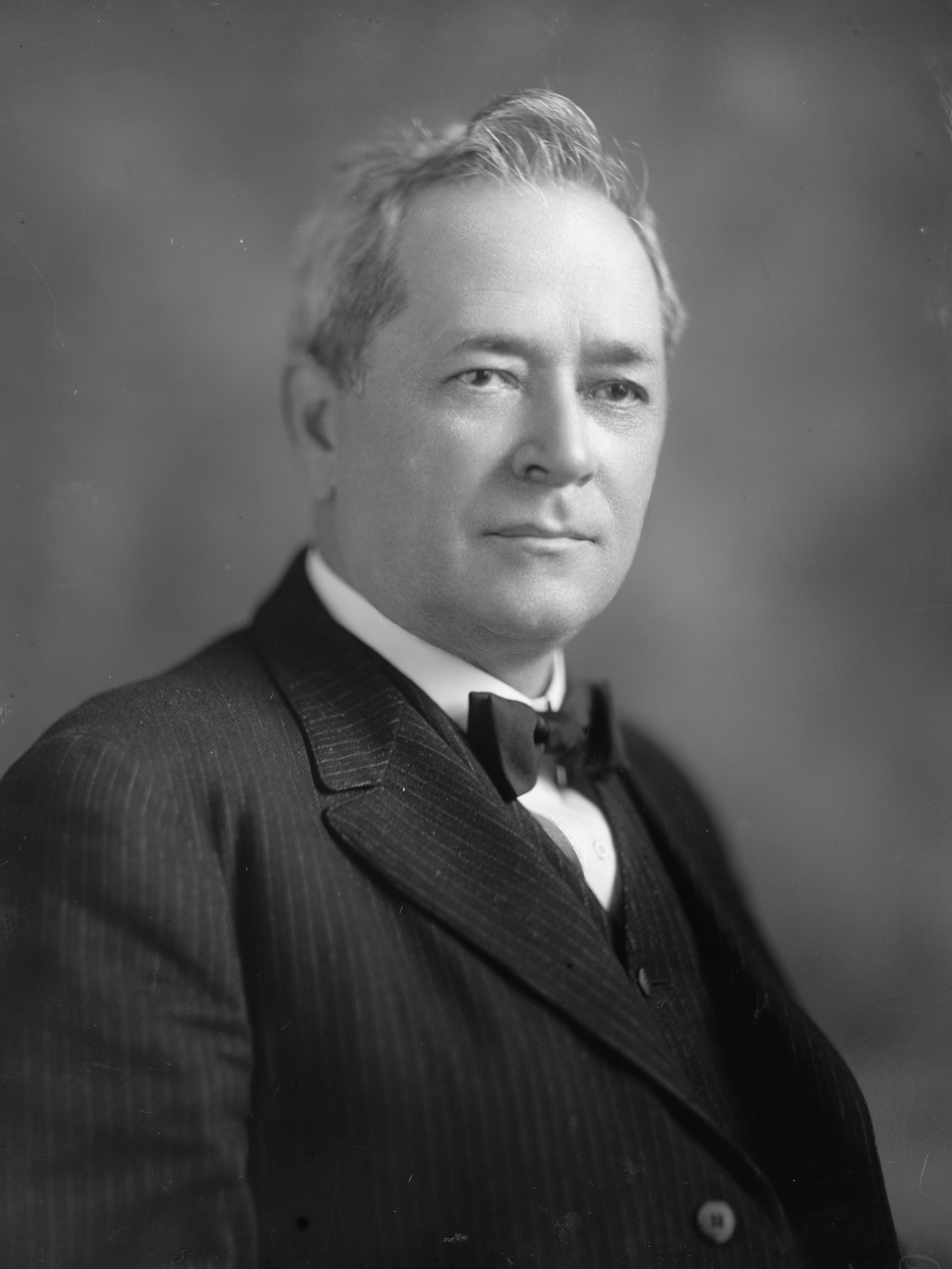
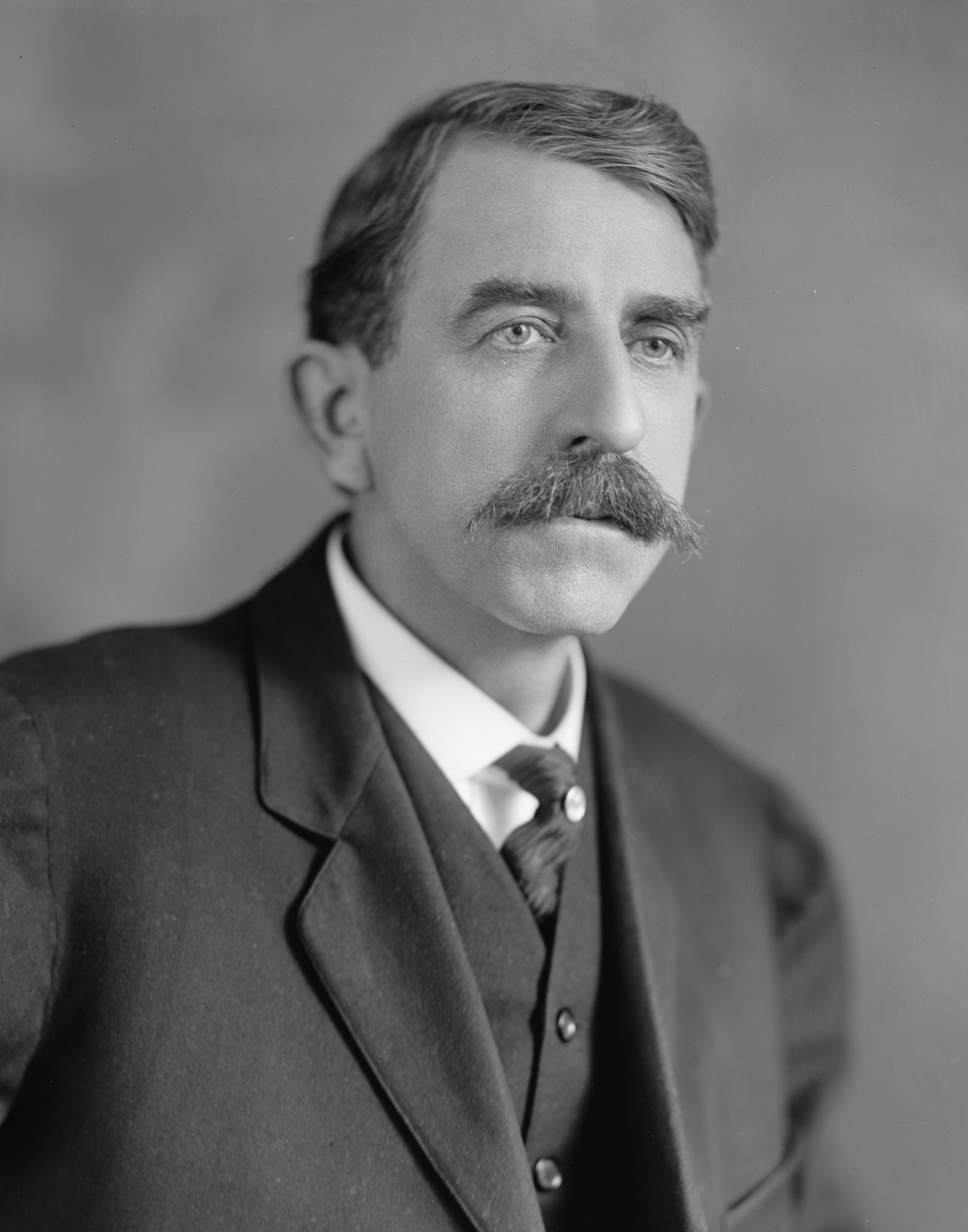
| W.C. Rogers (Cherokee) | Green McCurtain (Choctaw) | Pleasant Porter (Creek) | Alexander Posey (Creek) | John F. Brown (Seminole) | Charles Haskell (non-Native) | William H. Murray (non-Native) |

== Annexation ==
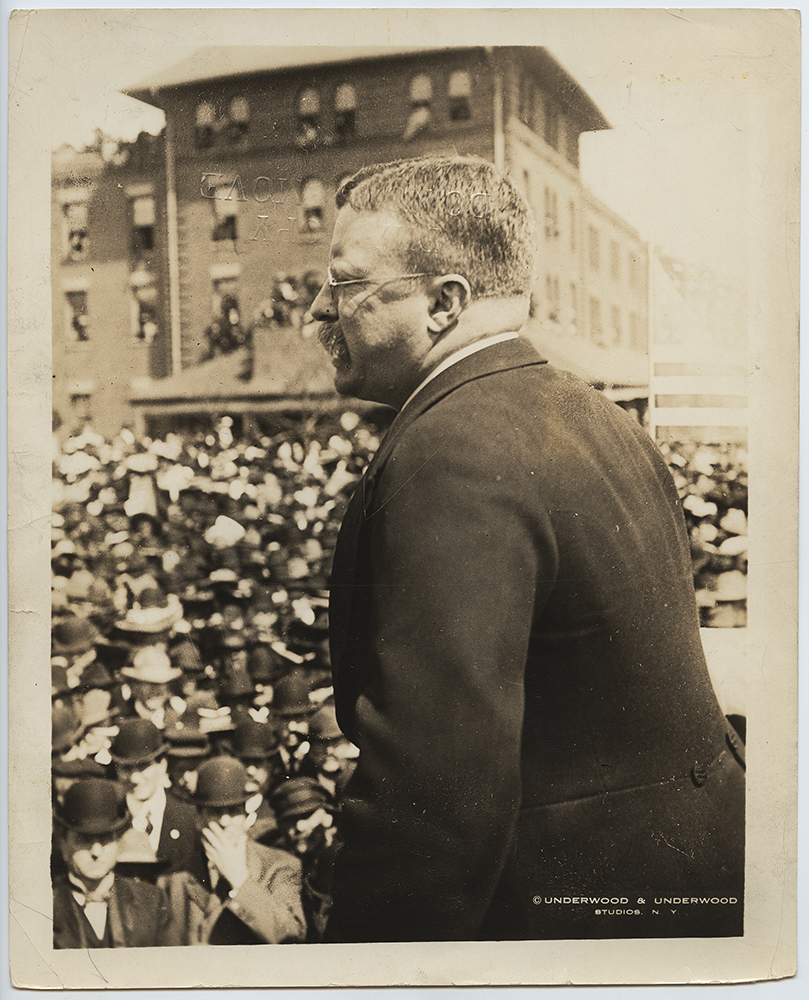
President Theodore Roosevelt, a proponent of joint-statehood, speaks at Muskogee in April 1905

Congress, however, did not support statehood for Sequoyah. President Theodore Roosevelt, long a proponent of annexation, spoke plainly in his Fifth Annual Message to Congress on December 5, 1905:

"I recommend that Indian Territory and Oklahoma be admitted as one state, and that New Mexico and Arizona be admitted as one state. There is no obligation upon us to treat territorial subdivisions, which are matters of convenience only, as binding us on the question of admission to Statehood... There is no justification for further delay; and the advisability of making the four Territories into two States has been clearly established."

Roosevelt proposed a "compromise" that would join Indian Territory with Oklahoma Territory to form a single state and resulted in passage of the Oklahoma Enabling Act, which he signed June 16, 1906.

Although the State of Sequoyah never came into existence, its constitution made an important contribution to Oklahoma history as it formed the majority of the later Oklahoma Constitution. The delegates who wrote it, including Haskell and Murray, shared an underlying populist distrust of elected officials. The convention also catapulted Haskell, Murray, and others further into the public arena, securing for Indian Territory a solid seat at the debate at the Oklahoma Constitutional Convention. Oklahoma became the 46th state on November 16, 1907, with Haskell as its first Governor and Murray as its first House Speaker.

== Aftermath ==
Following Oklahoma statehood, Haskell and Murray had segregation enshrined into law. The five tribes, diminished in power, faced further marginalization and discrimination, both racially and politically during the first half of the twentieth century. Termination efforts continued against them until 1970, when Richard Nixon repealed the Termination Act of 1959. Following this, the tribes began to elect their own chiefs and governments independent of federal oversight, and built separate agreements with the state government in Oklahoma City to protect their autonomy.

On July 9, 2020, the Supreme Court of the United States determined in McGirt v. Oklahoma that the reservations of the Five Tribes, comprising much of Eastern Oklahoma, were never disestablished by Congress and thus are still "Indian Country" for the purposes of criminal law. In late 2024, Sac and Fox writer and professor Donald Fixico theorized that the Five Tribes could revive the Sequoyah Movement for separate statehood following the McGirt decision.

== In fiction ==
In the Southern Victory series by Harry Turtledove, Indian Territory is annexed by the Confederate States in 1862, later becoming the State of Sequoyah, where the Five Civilized Tribes are granted autonomy and special protections, similar to the historical Sequoyah proposal. After the state is annexed by the United States following the First Great War, a failed plebiscite to return the state to the Confederacy serves as a casus belli for the Second Great War.
