= Hugo Lake =

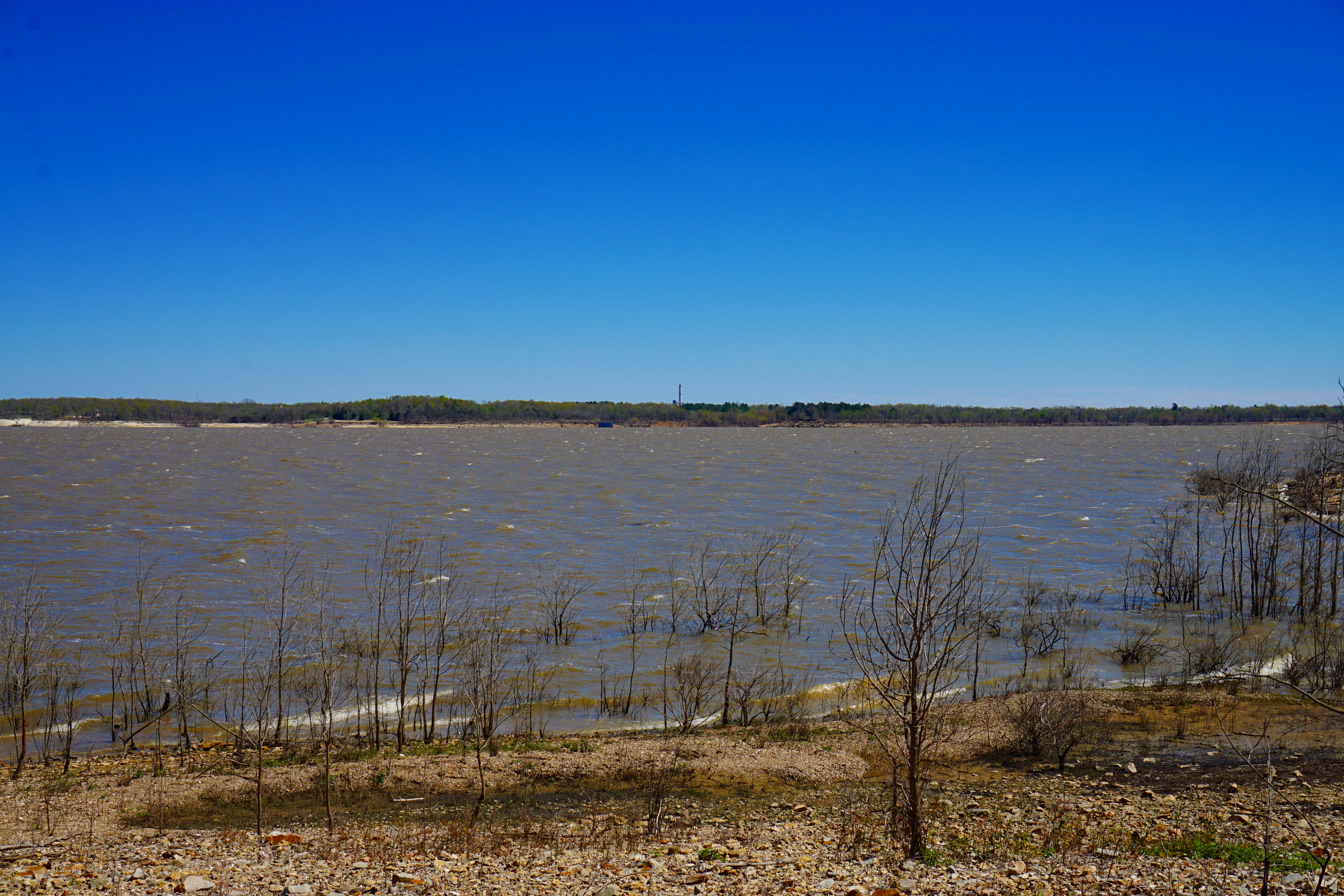
- Hugo Lake in 2016

- Location within Oklahoma Location within the United States
- Location: Choctaw County, Oklahoma
- Coordinates: 34°04′04″N 95°24′59″W
- Type: Reservoir
- Etymology: City of Hugo, Oklahoma
- Primary inflows: Kiamichi River
- Primary outflows: Kiamichi River
- Basin countries: United States
- Managing agency: Oklahoma Department of Wildlife Conservation (part), U.S. Army Corps of Engineers (part)
- Designation: flood control, water storage, and recreational opportunities
- First flooded: January 1974
- Surface area: 13,250 acres (53.6 km^{2})
- Water volume: 157,600 acre⋅ft (194,400,000 m^{3}) (normal); 966,700 acre⋅ft (1.1924×10^{9} m^{3}) (flood)
- Shore length^{1}: 110 miles (180 km)
- Surface elevation: 404.5 ft (123.3 m) (normal); 437.5 ft (133.4 m) (flood)
- Settlements: Hugo, Oklahoma
- ^{1} Shore length is not a well-defined measure.

Hugo Lake is manmade lake located 7 miles (11 km) east of Hugo, in Choctaw County, Oklahoma, United States. It is formed by Hugo Lake Dam on the Kiamichi River 18 miles (29 km) upstream from the Red River. The dam is visible from U.S. Route 70, which crosses its spillway just west of Sawyer. Lake Hugo features approximately 110 miles (180 km) of shoreline and covers over 13,250 acres (53.6 km^{2}), or 20 square miles (52 km^{2}). Its normal pool elevation is 404.5 feet (123.3 m) above sea level and its normal storage capacity is 157,600 acre-feet (194,400,000 m^{3}). At flood stage its elevation is at 437.5 feet (133.4 m) above sea level and it is capable of storing 966,700 acre-feet (1.1924×10^{9} m^{3}) of flood waters. The lake's primary functions are to provide flood control, water storage, and recreational opportunities.

The nearest major cities to Lake Hugo are Fort Smith, Arkansas (101 miles), Dallas, Texas (114 miles) and Oklahoma City, Oklahoma(151 miles).

== History ==
Authorized by the Flood Control Act of 1946 and Flood Control Act of 1962 construction on the dam began in October 1967. The US Army Corps of Engineers completed the project in January 1974 at a cost of approximately $37,000,000.

The US Army Corps of Engineers established Kiamichi Park on the lake just west of the dam site in 1974. The park was cut in half part of it still belonging to the US Army Corps of Engineers and the other was leased to the State in 2002 it was renamed Hugo Lake State Park. The park currently covers 289 acres (1.17 km^{2}).

== Recreation ==
The south 8,000 acres (32 km^{2}) of the lake nearest to the dam are clear of obstructions and provide recreational opportunities for watersports such as boating and water skiing. The state park provides cabins, hiking trails, and a 56-slip marina.

The north end of the lake is not cleared and contains dead tree stumps in the water. These stumps provide cover for the fish and ideal conditions for anglers. Hugo Lake features excellent crappie fishing and populations of bass and catfish.

In addition fishing there is also hunting and animal trapping at Hugo Lake. The Oklahoma Department of Wildlife Conservation administers 18,000 acres (73 km^{2}) at the lake, and the US Army Corps of Engineers manage 8,000. These areas are home to white tail deer, waterfowl, mink, fox, and beaver.

The Group Camp Area has four sites. The area has a combination waterborne shower and toilet building and swimming beach access. Each site has camping facilities that include a 30’ x 50’ shelter and five electric/water hook-ups.

== Controversy over water sales ==
In recent years, Hugo Lake has been in the middle of a controversy regarding out-of-state water sales between Texas and Oklahoma. The city of Hugo had sought to sell water to the growing suburbs of Dallas that need new sources of water to pay debts related to the lake. Irving, Texas has entered negotiations with the Hugo to obtain a supply of fresh water by building a pipeline and purchasing excess water from Hugo Lake. In 2002, the Oklahoma state legislature passed a moratorium on water sales outside the state. Hugo sued the state in federal court citing that the state's moratorium is unconstitutional.

== Pricing ==
Hospitality House & Training Center Rates:

One Night Stay: $475.00 per night plus applicable taxes

Two-night weekend stay: $600.00 total plus applicable taxes

A $150.00 Deposit is REQUIRED

Resort cabins:

Winter Rates: (December through February)

Monday-Thursday: $125 per night (plus tax)

Friday-Sunday & Holidays: $150 per night (plus tax)

Summer Rates: (March through November)

Monday-Thursday $150 per night (plus tax)

Friday-Sunday & Holidays: $175 per night (plus tax)

Primitive cabins:

Winter Rates (December through February)

Cabins with bathroom: $65 per night

Cabins without bathroom: $45 per night (facilities nearby)

Summer Rates (March through November)

Cabins with bathroom: $75 per night

Cabins without bathroom: $55 per night

== Hugo Lake State Park ==
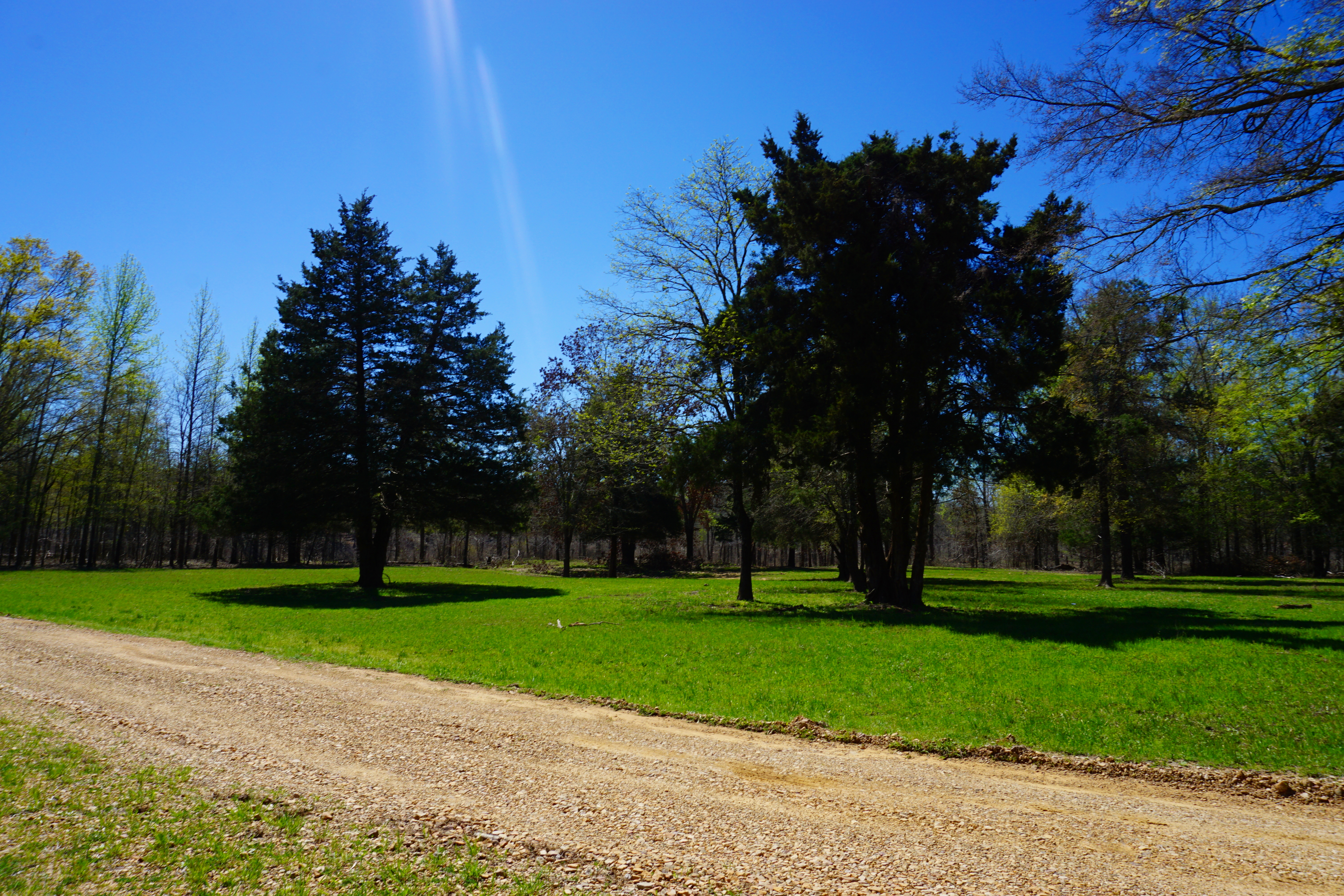
Hugo Lake State Park

On Hugo Lake the Hugo Lake State Park offers boating and fishing opportunities. The park offers 16 two bedroom resort cabins, 10 primitive cabins, a 56-slip full service marina with store, pavilions, picnic sites with grills and tables, and pontoon boat rentals. Hiking, biking, and nature trails are also on site. Tent camping is also available. The park is 1 of 7 Oklahoma State Parks that are in the path of totality for the 2024 solar eclipse, with 3 minutes and 33 seconds of totality.
