= Kiamitia County =

Kiamitia County, also known as Kiamichi County, was a political subdivision of the Choctaw Nation, Indian Territory. The county formed part of the nation's Pushmataha District, or Third District, one of three administrative super-regions.

Kiamitia County was formed in 1850 by the General Council of the Choctaw Nation. It was one of 19 counties established. The county took its name from the Kiamichi River. Historians debate the origin and correct spelling of this word, but most have concluded that it was derived from the French word kamichi, meaning "horned-screamer," a species of water bird. They say it was named by French explorers during the 1700s.

The county seat of Kiamitia County was Goodland. The original Choctaw settlement of Goodland was four miles north of present-day Hugo, Oklahoma. A United States Post Office operated at Goodland, Indian Territory from August 21, 1871, to February 28, 1902. The community centered at the county seat no longer exists. Modern Goodland is located three miles south of Hugo. A post office called "Goodland, Oklahoma," located in the building of the Goodland Indian Orphanage, operated there from April 5, 1915, to July 31, 1944.

== Etymology ==
The spelling and rendering of the county's official name appears to have been Kiamitia, reflecting the fact that the name of the Kiamichi River—for which it was named—was not standardized as such until the 20th century. The Choctaw Nation labeled the county as "Kiamitia," as did Angie Debo, the Nation's preeminent historian. She used the term Kiamitia County in her epic history, The Rise and Fall of the Choctaw Republic (1934). Edwin C. McReynolds, in his landmark Historical Atlas of Oklahoma (1965), renders the spelling of the county as "Kiamichi".

== Boundaries ==
Kiamitia County's boundaries were designated according to easily recognizable natural landmarks, as was done for all the Choctaw counties. Much of its northern boundary, south of Antlers, was formed by Beaver Creek. Much of its western boundary was Muddy Boggy Creek. Its eastern boundary, in part, was formed by the Kiamichi River, and its southern boundary was the Red River of the South.

== Establishment ==
As Oklahoma's admission to statehood approached, its representatives participating in the Oklahoma Constitutional Convention and laying out the future state's counties, realized that Kiamitia County could not exist as an economically viable political subdivision. By the time of Oklahoma's statehood in 1907, its county seat existed as the site to hold county court, as well as for educational and religious purposes, but it had not developed as a population center. Hugo, although by then the area's largest town, was until statehood cut off from some of its natural economic hinterland. This area fell within neighboring Red River and Towson counties of the Choctaw Nation.

Framers of the proposed State of Sequoyah, who met in 1905 to propose statehood for the Indian Territory, also recognized the difficulties with some of the Choctaw counties. As proposed by the Sequoyah Constitutional Convention, the State of Seqyoyan would abolish the Choctaw county boundaries and establish new ones. In this case, Kiamitia County was generally retained as a jurisdiction, but was to be expanded to the east and west; it was renamed as Hitchcock County, and the proposed county seat was the population center - Hugo.

Oklahoma's framers largely adopted the proposed boundaries for Hitchcock County but called it Choctaw County, Oklahoma, and designated Hugo as its county seat.

Like all Choctaw counties, Kiamitia County served as an election district for members of the National Council, and as a unit of local administration. Constitutional officers, all of whom served for two-year terms and were elected by the voters, included the county judge, sheriff, and a ranger. The judge's duties included oversight of overall county administration. The sheriff collected taxes, monitored unlawful intrusion by intruders (usually white Americans from the United States), and conducted the census. The county ranger advertised and sold livestock that was collected after straying from its owner's territory.
