= Tornado intensity =

Measurement of strength and severity of tornadoes

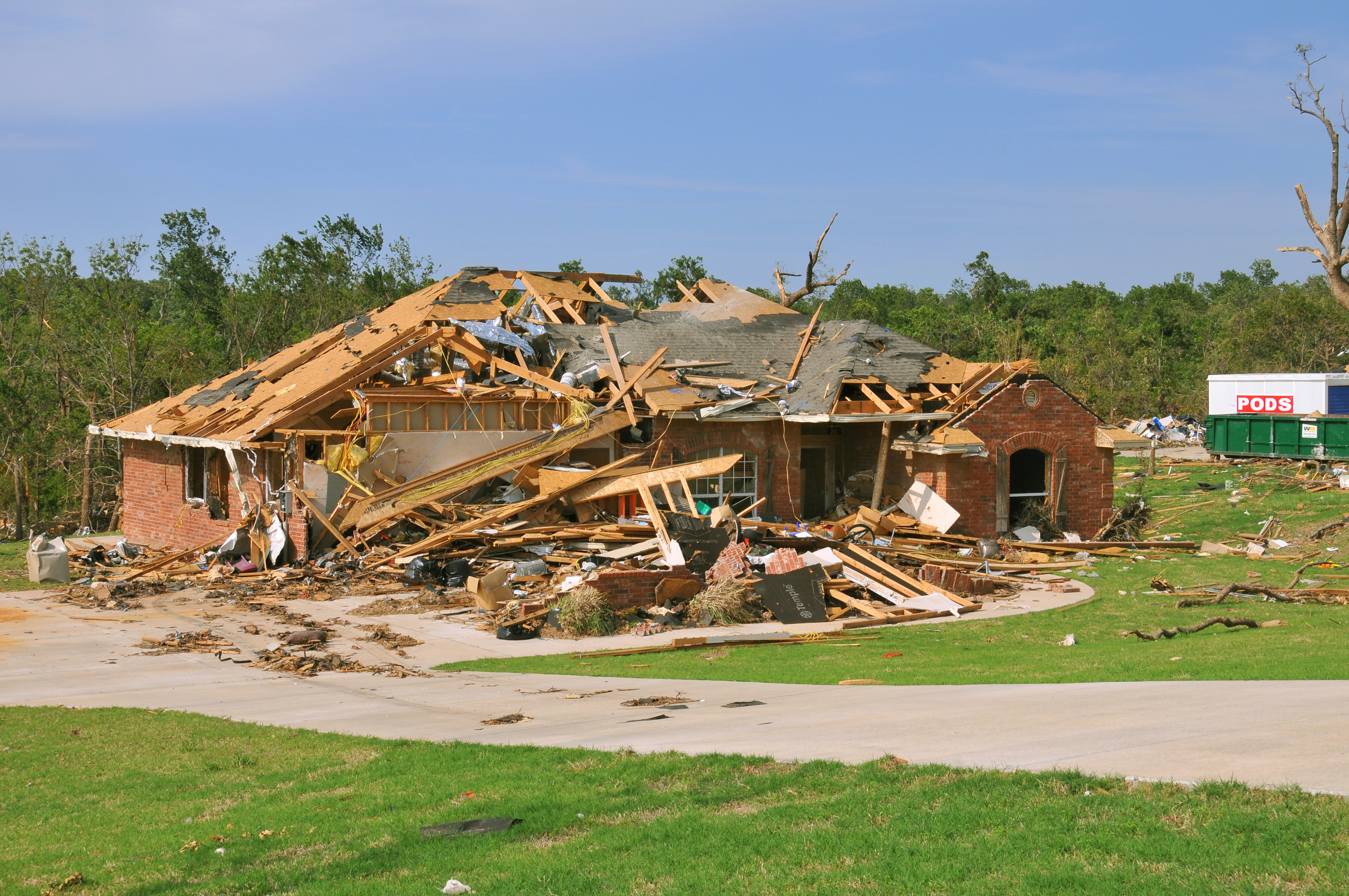
Tornado damage to a house in Oklahoma County, Oklahoma, hit during the Tornado outbreak of May 10–13, 2010

Tornado intensity is the measure of wind speeds and potential risk produced by a tornado. Intensity can be measured by in situ or remote sensing measurements, but since these are impractical for wide-scale use, intensity is usually inferred by proxies, such as damage. The Fujita scale, Enhanced Fujita scale, and the International Fujita scale rate tornadoes by the damage caused. In contrast to other major storms such as hurricanes and typhoons, such classifications are only assigned retroactively. Wind speed alone is not enough to determine the intensity of a tornado. An EF0 tornado may damage trees and peel some shingles off roofs, while an EF5 tornado can rip well-anchored homes off their foundations, leaving them bare— even deforming large skyscrapers. The similar TORRO scale ranges from a T0 for extremely weak tornadoes to T11 for the most powerful known tornadoes. Doppler radar data, photogrammetry, and ground swirl patterns (cycloidal marks) may also be analyzed to determine the intensity and assign a rating.

Tornadoes vary in intensity regardless of shape, size, and location, though strong tornadoes are typically larger than weak tornadoes. The association with track length and duration also varies, although longer-track (and longer-lived) tornadoes tend to be stronger. In the case of violent tornadoes, only a small portion of the path area is of violent intensity; most of the higher intensity is from subvortices. In the United States, 80% of tornadoes are rated EF0 or EF1 (equivalent to T0 through T3). The rate of occurrence drops off quickly with increasing strength; less than 1% are rated as violent (EF4 or EF5, equivalent to T8 through T11).

== History of tornado intensity measurements ==
A diagram of the Fujita scale as it relates to the Beaufort scale and the Mach number scale

For many years, before the advent of Doppler radar, scientists relied on educated guesses for tornado wind speed. The only evidence indicating wind speeds found in the tornado was the damage left behind by tornadoes that struck populated areas. Some believed they reach 400 miles per hour (640 kilometers per hour); others thought they might exceed 500 miles per hour (800 km/h), and perhaps even be supersonic. One can still find these incorrect guesses in some old (until the 1960s) literature, such as the original Fujita intensity scale developed by Dr. Tetsuya Theodore "Ted" Fujita in the early 1970s. However, one can find accounts (e.g. ; be sure to scroll down) of some remarkable work done in this field by a U.S. Army soldier, Sergeant John Park Finley.

In 1971, Dr. Fujita introduced the idea of a scale to measure tornado winds. With the help of colleague Allen Pearson, he created and introduced what came to be called the Fujita scale in 1973. The F in F1, F2, etc. stands for Fujita. The scale was based on a relationship between the Beaufort scale and the Mach number scale; the low end of F1 on his scale corresponds to the low end of B12 on the Beaufort scale, and the low end of F12 corresponds to the speed of sound at sea level, or Mach 1. In practice, tornadoes are only assigned categories F0 through F5.

The TORRO scale, created by the Tornado and Storm Research Organization (TORRO), was developed in 1974 and published a year later. The TORRO scale has 12 levels, which cover a broader range with tighter graduations. It ranges from a T0 for extremely weak tornadoes to T11 for the most powerful known tornadoes. T0–T1 roughly corresponds to F0, T2–T3 to F1, and so on. While T10–T11 would be roughly equivalent to F5, the highest tornado rated to date on the TORRO scale was a T8. Some debate exists as to the usefulness of the TORRO scale over the Fujita scale—while it may be helpful for statistical purposes to have more levels of tornado strength, often the damage caused could be created by a large range of winds, rendering it hard to narrow the tornado down to a single TORRO scale category.

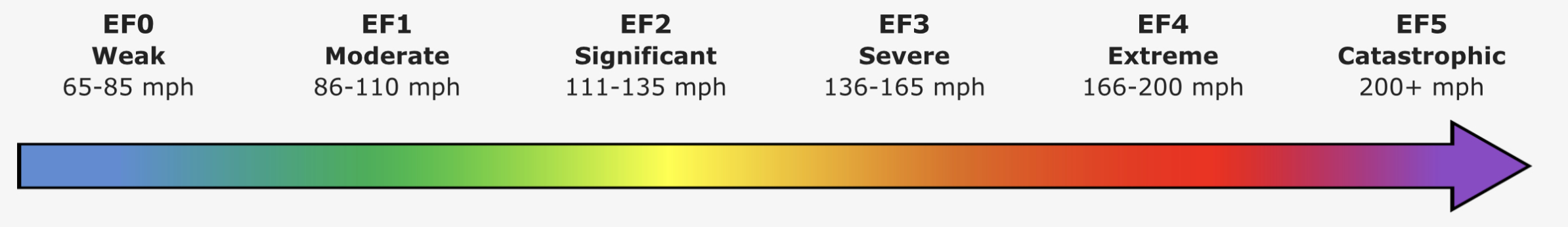
The National Weather Service’s arrow showing the Enhanced Fujita scale. This includes a description word and wind speed range for each level of the scale.

Research conducted in the late 1980s and 1990s suggested that even with the implication of the Fujita scale, tornado winds were notoriously overestimated, especially in significant and violent tornadoes. Because of this, in 2006, the American Meteorological Society introduced the Enhanced Fujita scale, to help assign realistic wind speeds to tornado damage. The scientists specifically designed the scale so that a tornado assessed on the Fujita scale and the Enhanced Fujita scale would receive the same ranking. The EF-scale is more specific in detailing the degrees of damage on different types of structures for a given wind speed. While the F-scale goes from F0 to F12 in theory, the EF-scale is capped at EF5, which is defined as "winds ≥200 miles per hour (320 km/h)". In the United States, the Enhanced Fujita scale went into effect on February 2, 2007, for tornado damage assessments and the Fujita scale is no longer used.

The first observation confirming that F5 winds could occur happened on April 26, 1991. A tornado near Red Rock, Oklahoma, was monitored by scientists using a portable Doppler weather radar, an experimental radar device that measures wind speed. Near the tornado's peak intensity, they recorded a wind speed of 115–120 meters per second (260–270 miles per hour; 410–430 kilometers per hour). Though the portable radar had the uncertainty of ±5–10 metres per second (11–22 mph; 18–36 km/h), this reading was probably within the F5 range, confirming that tornadoes were capable of violent winds found nowhere else on earth.

Eight years later, during the 1999 Oklahoma tornado outbreak of May 3, another scientific team was monitoring an exceptionally violent tornado (one which eventually killed 36 people in the Oklahoma City metropolitan area). Around 7 p.m., they recorded one measurement of 301 ± 20 miles per hour (484 ± 32 km/h), 50 miles per hour (80 km/h) faster than the previous record. Though this reading is just short of the theoretical F6 rating, the measurement was taken more than 100 feet (30 meters) in the air, where winds are typically stronger than at the surface. In rating tornadoes, only surface wind speeds or the wind speeds indicated by the damage resulting from the tornado, are taken into account. Also, in practice, the F6 rating is not used.

While scientists have long theorized that extremely low pressures might occur in the center of tornadoes, no measurements confirm it. A few home barometers had survived close passes by tornadoes, recording values as low as 24 inches of mercury (810 hectopascals), but these measurements were highly uncertain. In 2003, a U.S. research team succeeded in dropping devices called "turtles" into an F4 tornado, and one measured a pressure drop of more than 100 hectopascals (3.0 inHg) as the tornado passed directly overhead. Still, tornadoes are widely varied, so meteorologists are still researching to determine if these values are typical or not.

In 2018, the International Fujita scale was created by the European Severe Storms Laboratory as well as other various European meteorological agencies. Unlike the other three scales (Fujita, Enhanced Fujita, and TORRO), the International Fujita scale has overlapping wind speeds within the ratings. The highest tornado rated on the IF scale was the 2021 South Moravia tornado, which was rated an IF4.

On May 28, 2019, storm chaser and meteorologist Reed Timmer, alongside Team Dominator, launched a custom-built meteorological probe attached to a rocket into the violent Linwood EF4 tornado, in eastern Kansas. The research probe was launched from their Dominator 3 Storm Research Vehicle south of Lawrence, into the mesocyclone of the parent tornadic supercell, and reached a maximum height of 11,914 m (39,088 ft) above sea level into the troposphere before plummeting back down within the city of Leavenworth. During its 30-minute pseudo-Lagrangian flight inside the tornadic circulation, the rocket probe recorded 85.1 m/s (306 km/h; 190 mph) instantaneous winds and a maximum barometric pressure drop of -113.5 hPa. The tornado was ultimately rated low-end EF4 with estimated winds of 170 mph (270 km/h) by the National Weather Service, contradictory to Team Dominator's findings of 85.1 m/s winds. Reed Timmer and his crew were the first ever storm chasing research team to use the method of rocket probes to measure tornado intensity.

== Typical intensity ==
In the U.S., F0 and F1 (T0 through T3) tornadoes account for 80% of all tornadoes. The rate of occurrence drops off quickly with increasing strength—violent tornadoes (F4/T8 or stronger), account for less than one percent of all tornado reports. Worldwide, strong tornadoes account for an even smaller percentage of total tornadoes. Violent tornadoes are extremely rare outside of the United States and Canada.

F5 and EF5 tornadoes are rare. In the United States, they typically only occur once every few years, and account for approximately 0.1 percent of confirmed tornadoes. An F5 tornado was reported in Elie, Manitoba in Canada on June 22, 2007. Before that, the last confirmed F5 was the 1999 Bridge Creek–Moore tornado, which killed 36 people on May 3, 1999. Ten EF5 tornadoes have occurred in the United States, in Greensburg, Kansas on May 4, 2007, Parkersburg, Iowa on May 25, 2008, Philadelphia, Mississippi, Hackleburg, Alabama, Smithville, Mississippi, and Rainsville, Alabama (four separate tornadoes) on April 27, 2011, Joplin, Missouri on May 22, 2011, El Reno, Oklahoma on May 24, 2011, Moore, Oklahoma on May 20, 2013, and Enderlin, North Dakota on June 20, 2025.

== Typical damage ==
Tornado rating classifications
T0		T1	T2		T3	T4		T5	T6	T7	T8	T9	T10	T11
IF0−	IF0	IF0+	IF1−	IF1	IF1+	IF2−	IF2	IF2+	IF3		IF4		IF5
F0; EF0			F1; EF1			F2; EF2			F3; EF3		F4; EF4		F5; EF5
Weak						Strong					Violent
						Significant
									Intense

A typical tornado has winds of 110 miles per hour (180 km/h) or less, is about 250 feet (76 m) across, and travels about one mile (1.6 km) before dissipating. However, tornado behavior is variable; these figures represent statistical probabilities only.

Two tornadoes that look almost the same can produce drastically different effects. Also, two tornadoes that look very different can produce similar damage, because tornadoes form by several different mechanisms and also follow a lifecycle that causes the same tornado to change in appearance over time. People in the path of a tornado should never attempt to determine its strength as it approaches. Between 1950 and 2014 in the United States, 222 people have been killed by (E)F1 tornadoes, and 21 have been killed by (E)F0 tornadoes.

=== Weak tornadoes ===
Around 60–70 percent of tornadoes are designated EF1 or EF0, also known as "weak" tornadoes. But "weak" is a relative term for tornadoes, as even these can cause significant damage. F0 and F1 tornadoes are typically short-lived; since 1980, almost 75 percent of tornadoes rated weak stayed on the ground for 1 mile (1.6 km) or less. In this time, though, they can cause both damage and fatalities.

EF0 (T0–T1) damage is characterized by superficial damage to structures and vegetation. Well-built structures are typically unscathed, though sometimes sustaining broken windows, with minor damage to roofs and chimneys. Billboards and large signs can be knocked down. Trees may have large branches broken off and can be uprooted if they have shallow roots. Any tornado that is confirmed, but causes no damage (i.e., remains in open fields) is normally rated EF0, as well, even if the tornado had winds that would give it a higher rating. Some NWS offices, however, have rated these tornadoes EFU (EF-Unknown) due to the lack of damage.

EF1 (T2–T3) damage has caused significantly more fatalities than those caused by EF0 tornadoes. At this level, damage to mobile homes and other temporary structures becomes significant, and cars and other vehicles can be pushed off the road or flipped. Permanent structures can suffer major damage to their roofs.

Weak tornadoes
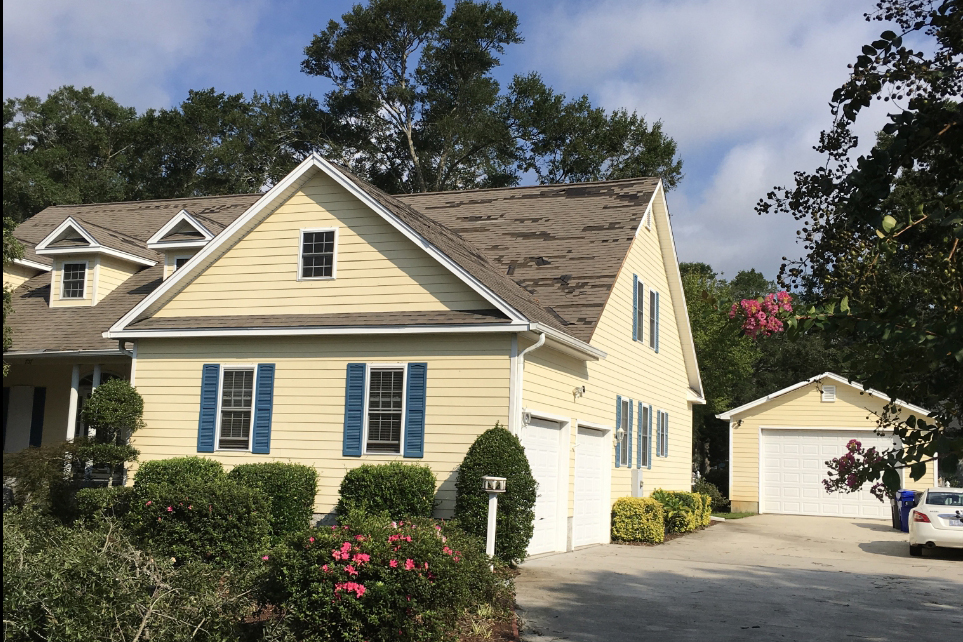
EF0 damage: This house only sustained a minor loss of shingles. Though well-built structures are typically unscathed by EF0 tornadoes, falling trees and tree branches can injure and kill people, even inside a sturdy structure. Between 35 and 40% of all annual tornadoes in the U.S. are rated EF0.

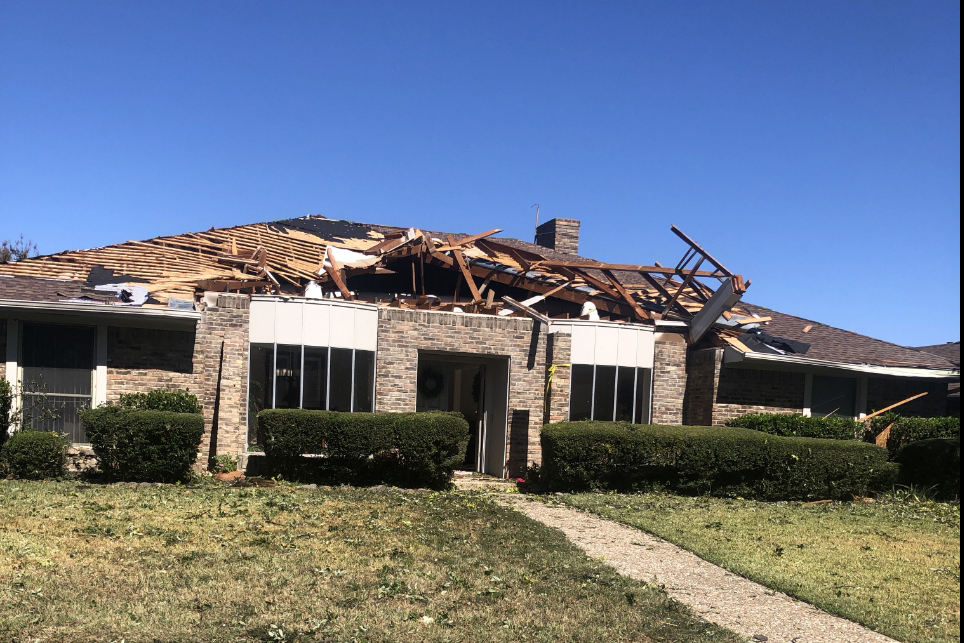
EF1 damage: Cause major damage to mobile homes and automobiles, and can cause minor structural damage to well-constructed homes. This frame home sustained major roof damage but otherwise remained intact. Around 35% of all annual tornadoes in the U.S. are rated EF1.

=== Significant tornadoes ===
EF2 (T4–T5) tornadoes are the lower end of "significant" yet are stronger than most tropical cyclones (though tropical cyclones affect a much larger area and their winds take place for much longer duration). Well-built structures can suffer serious damage, including roof loss, and the collapse of some exterior walls may occur in poorly built structures. Mobile homes, however, are destroyed. Vehicles can be lifted off the ground, and lighter objects can become small missiles, causing damage outside of the tornado's main path. Wooded areas have a large percentage of their trees snapped or uprooted.

EF3 (T6–T7) damage is a serious risk to life and limb and the point at which a tornado statistically becomes significantly more destructive and deadly. Few parts of affected buildings are left standing; well-built structures lose all outer and some inner walls. Unanchored homes are swept away, and homes with poor anchoring may collapse entirely. Small vehicles and similarly sized objects are lifted off the ground and tossed as projectiles. Wooded areas suffer an almost total loss of vegetation, and some tree debarking may occur. Statistically speaking, EF3 is the maximum level that allows for reasonably effective residential sheltering in place in a first-floor interior room closest to the center of the house (the most widespread tornado sheltering procedure in America for those with no basement or underground storm shelter).

Significant tornadoes
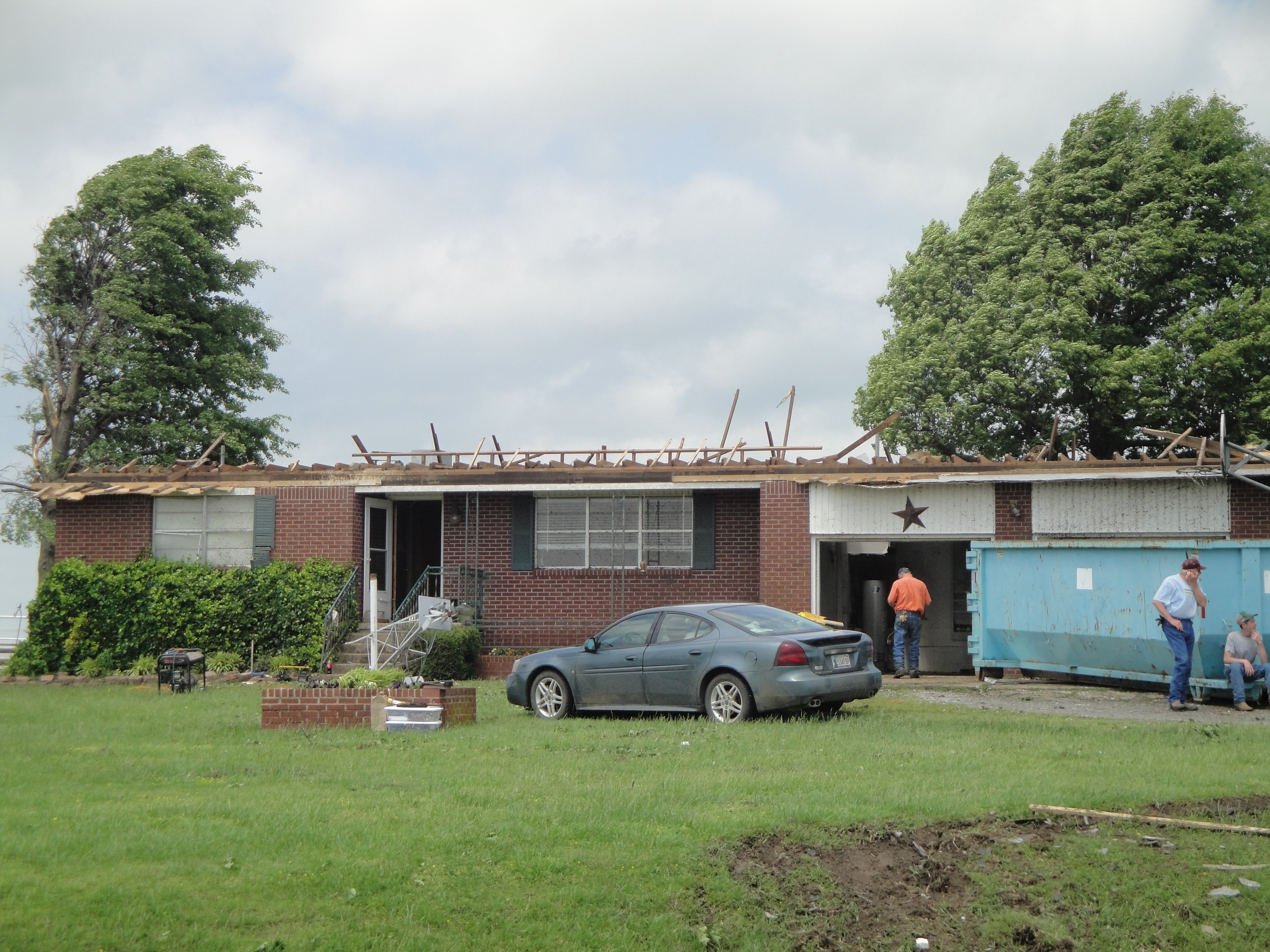
EF2 damage: At this intensity, tornadoes have a more significant impact on well-built structures, removing the roofs, and collapsing some exterior walls of poorly built structures. EF2 tornadoes are capable of destroying mobile homes and generating large amounts of flying debris. This home completely lost its roof, but its walls remained intact. Between 15 and 19% of all annual tornadoes in the U.S. are rated EF2.

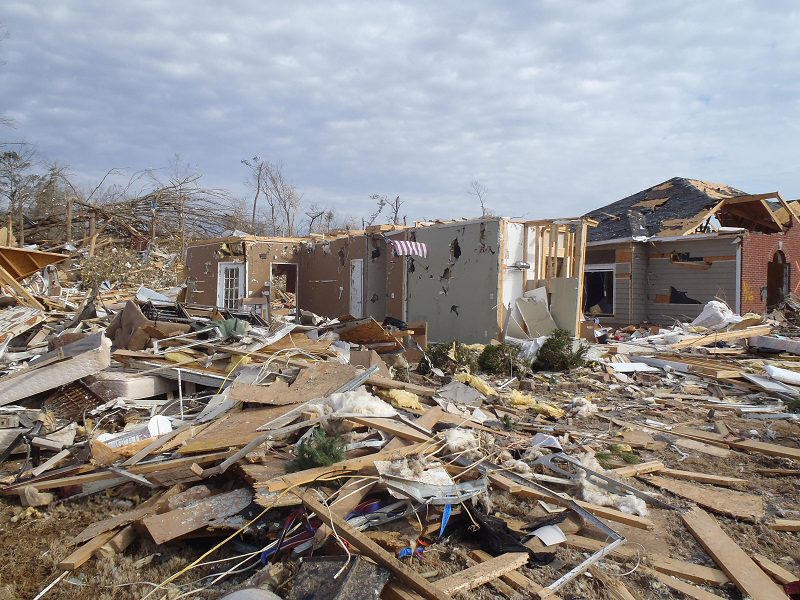
EF3 damage: Here, the roof and all but some inner walls of this frame home have been demolished. While taking shelter in a basement, cellar, or inner room improves one's odds of surviving a tornado drastically, occasionally even this is not enough. EF3 and stronger tornadoes only account for about 6% of all annual tornadoes in the United States, yet since 1980, they have accounted for more than 75% of tornado-related deaths.

=== Violent tornadoes ===
EF4 (T8–T9) damage typically results in a total loss of the affected structure. Well-built homes are reduced to a short pile of medium-sized debris on the foundation. Homes with poor or no anchoring are swept completely away. Large, heavy vehicles, including airplanes, trains, and large trucks, can be pushed over, flipped repeatedly, or picked up and thrown. Large, healthy trees are entirely debarked and snapped off close to the ground or uprooted altogether and turned into flying projectiles. Passenger cars and similarly sized objects can be picked up and flung for considerable distances. EF4 damage can be expected to level even the most robustly built homes, making the common practice of sheltering in an interior room on the ground floor of a residence insufficient to ensure survival. A storm shelter, bomb shelter, reinforced basement, or other subterranean shelter can provide substantial safety against EF4 tornadoes.

EF5 (T10–T11) damage represents the upper limit of tornado power, and destruction is almost always total. An EF5 tornado pulls well-built, well-anchored homes off their foundations and into the air before obliterating them, flinging the wreckage for miles, and sweeping the foundation clean. Large, steel-reinforced structures such as schools are completely leveled. Tornadoes of this intensity tend to shred and scour low-lying grass and vegetation from the ground. Very little recognizable structural debris is generated by EF5 damage, with most materials reduced to a coarse mix of small, granular particles and dispersed evenly across the tornado's damage path. Large, multiple-ton steel frame vehicles and farm equipment are often mangled beyond recognition and tossed miles away or reduced entirely to unrecognizable parts. The official description of this damage highlights the extreme nature of the destruction, noting that "incredible phenomena will occur"; historically, this has included such displays of power as twisting skyscrapers, digging up large trenches into the ground, ripping roofs off of tornado bunkers, collapsing heavy oil rigs, leveling entire communities, derailing and tossing several train cars, and stripping asphalt from roadbeds. Despite their relative rarity, the damage caused by EF5 tornadoes represents a disproportionate hazard to life and limb; since 1950 in the United States, only 60 tornadoes (0.1% of all reports) have been designated F5 or EF5, and yet these have been responsible for more than 1,300 deaths and 14,000 injuries (21.5 and 13.6%, respectively).

Violent tornadoes
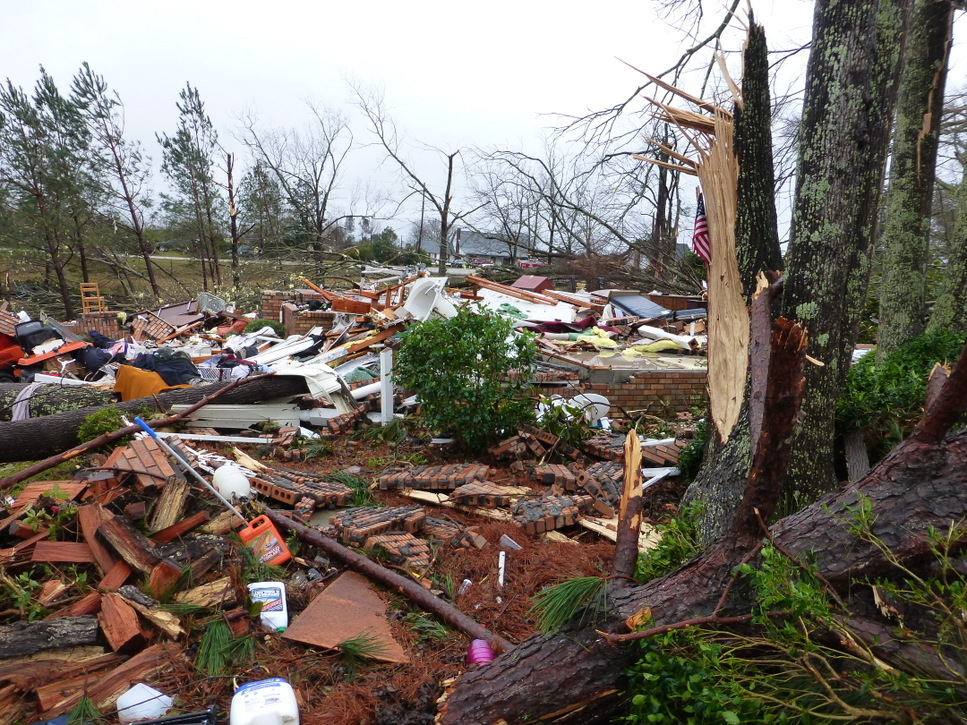
EF4 damage: Brick home reduced to piles of rubble. Above-ground structures are almost completely vulnerable to EF4 tornadoes, which level well-built structures, toss heavy vehicles through the air, and uproot trees, turning them into flying missiles. Around 1.1% of annual tornadoes in the U.S. are rated EF4.

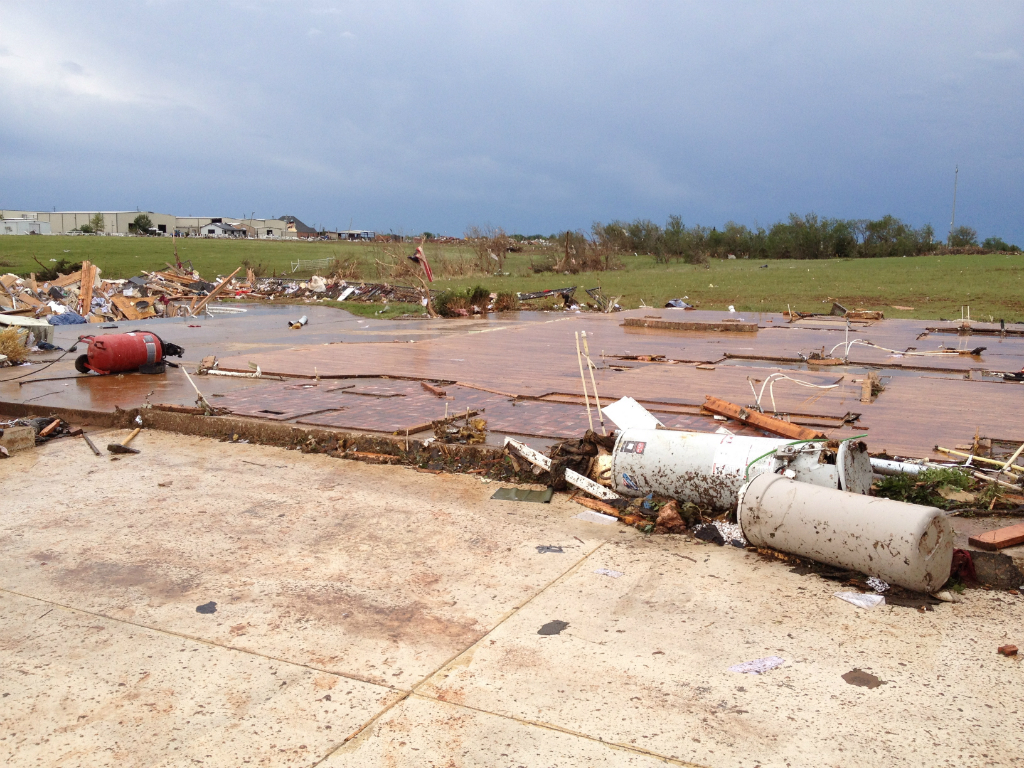
EF5 damage: These tornadoes cause destruction, obliterating and sweeping away almost anything in their paths, including those sheltering in open basements. However, they are extremely rare (making up less than 0.1% of annual tornadoes in the U.S.), and even a tornado rated as EF5 usually only produces EF5 damage across a relatively small portion of the damage path (with EF0-EF4 damage zones surrounding the central EF5 core).

== Outbreak Intensity score ==
In late 2023, American meteorologist and tornado expert Thomas P. Grazulis created the Outbreak Intensity Score (OIS) as a way to rank tornado outbreaks. For the score, only significant tornadoes are counted: F2/EF2 tornadoes receive 2 points each, F3/EF3 tornadoes receive 5 points each, F4/EF4 tornadoes receive 10 points each, and F5/EF5 tornadoes receive 15 points each. The number of total points determine the rating for the outbreak, which is broken up into seven categories.

Type of outbreak	Weak	Minor	Significant	Major	Devastating	Historic	Super
Number of points	2–6	7–10	11–29	30–79	80–119	120–249	250+

=== Lists of outbreaks ===
==== Super outbreaks ====
There have been three tornado outbreaks which scored more than 250 points on the OIS, reaching the status of "Super Outbreak".

Super outbreaks
Outbreak	OIS score	# of (E)F2s	# of (E)F3s	# of (E)F4s	# of (E)F5s	Total tornadoes	Deaths	Injuries	References
1974 Super Outbreak	578	34	35	23	7	148	319	5,454	
2011 Super Outbreak	383	49	23	11	4	368	324	2,892	
Tornado outbreak sequence of May 25 – June 1, 1917	296	28	17	14	1	66+	383+	746+	

==== Historic outbreaks ====
There have been 44 tornado outbreaks which scored at least 120 points, but less than 249 on the OIS, reaching the status of "Historic Outbreak".

Historic outbreaks
Outbreak	OIS score	# of (E)F2s	# of (E)F3s	# of (E)F4s	# of (E)F5s	Total tornadoes	Deaths	Injuries	References
1965 Palm Sunday tornado outbreak	238	14	6	18	0	55	266	3,662	
Tornado outbreak sequence of May 2003	232	36	20	6	0	363	42	652	
Tornado outbreak sequence of May 14–31, 1962	209	47	15	4	0	188	3	168	
Tornado outbreak sequence of May 1896	199	17	12	6	3	38+	501+	1,914+	
Tornado outbreak sequence of May 6–27, 1995	188	39	14	4	0	279	13	500+	
Tornado outbreak of November 21–23, 1992	187	26	15	6	0	95	26	641	
Tornado outbreak of June 14–18, 1992	186	33	15	3	1	170	1	110	
Tornado outbreak of April 2–3, 1956	185	25	8	8	1	55	39	790	
1932 Deep South tornado outbreak	182	16	10	10	0	38	330	2,141	
Tornado outbreak sequence of May 1982	174	42	16	1	0	329	14	18+	
Tornado outbreak sequence of May 22–31, 1973	172	41	10	4	0	145	24	820	
Tornado outbreak of May 1927	169	17	8	8	1	34+	217+	1,156+	
Tornado outbreak of March 21–22, 1952	169	7	11	10	0	30	204	1,155	
Early May 1965 tornado outbreak	169	22	6	8	1	72	17	770	
1985 United States–Canada tornado outbreak	169	7	12	8	1	44	90	875	
Tornado outbreak sequence of May 21–26, 2011	162	31	8	3	2	239	178	1,630	
Tornado outbreak of April 20–22, 1912	159	12	9	9	0	32+	56+	410+	
May 1960 tornado outbreak sequence	157	26	10	4	1	71	33	302	
Tornado outbreak of March 16–17, 1942	156	8	13	6	1	30+	149	1,312+	
Tornado outbreak sequence of April 25 – May 3, 1954	154	37	10	3	0	100	4	167	
Tornado outbreak sequence of March 18–27, 1948	153	19	11	6	0	36	80	896	
1920 Palm Sunday tornado outbreak	150	15	8	8	0	37+	153+	1,215+	
Tornado outbreak of March 13–16, 2025	147	31	11	3	0	117	23	65+	
Tornado outbreak sequence of May 1983	146	33	16	0	0	157	6	2+	
1999 Great Plains tornado outbreak	145	20	10	4	1	152	50	895	
Tornado outbreak of April 29 – May 1, 1909	140	30	8	4	0	43+	181+	770+	
Tornado outbreak sequence of April 18–27, 1957	140	30	8	4	0	117	2	33	
Tornado outbreak sequence of May 4–8, 1964	140	35	7	2	1	73	15	383	
Enigma tornado outbreak	135	25	9	4	0	51+	180+	1,056+	
2020 Easter tornado outbreak	133	19	13	3	0	141	32	257	
Tornado outbreak of April 27–29, 1912	130	10	6	8	0	26	47+	175+	
Tornado outbreak of March 31 – April 1, 2023	129	32	11	1	0	147	26	218+	
Tornado outbreak of April 14–16, 2011	129	32	13	0	0	178	38	588	
June 1990 Lower Ohio Valley tornado outbreak	129	17	5	7	0	66	9	253	
Tornado outbreak of April 2–3, 1982	128	14	11	3	1	63	30	433	
Tornado outbreak sequence of April 19–21, 1973	127	26	9	3	0	68	2	106	
Flint–Worcester tornado outbreak sequence	126	13	7	5	1	50	251	2,619	
March 1990 Central United States tornado outbreak	126	13	10	2	2	64	2	89	
1991 Great Plains tornado outbreak	126	18	7	4	1	55	21	313	
1908 Dixie tornado outbreak	124	22	3	5	1	31+	324+	1,720+	
Tornado outbreak sequence of May 3–9, 1961	123	29	9	2	0	73	23	126	
Tornado outbreak sequence of December 18–20, 1957	122	16	9	3	1	37	19	291	
May 1957 Central Plains tornado outbreak sequence	120	20	7	3	1	57	59	341	

==== Devastating outbreaks ====
There have been several tornado outbreaks which scored at least 80 points, but less than 120 on the OIS, reaching the status of "Devastating Outbreak".

Devastating outbreaks
Outbreak	OIS score	# of (E)F2s	# of (E)F3s	# of (E)F4s	# of (E)F5s	Total tornadoes	Deaths	Injuries	References
Tornado outbreak of June 5–6, 1916	115	20	13	1	0	35+	143+	756+	
Tornado outbreak of March 27, 1890	114	12	6	6	0	24+	187+	846+	
1984 Carolinas tornado outbreak	109	7	5	7	0	24	57	1,249	
2008 Super Tuesday tornado outbreak	107	16	5	5	0	87	57	425	
Tornado outbreak sequence of May 2004	106	23	8	2	0	389	7	123	
Tornado outbreak of May 1968	105	10	7	2	2	46	72	1,203	
Tornado outbreak of March 20–21, 1976	104	17	8	3	0	66	3	189	
Tornado outbreak sequence of May 4–10, 1933	102	16	8	3	0	33+	128	644+	
Tornado outbreak sequence of April 2–5, 1957	102	26	6	2	0	73	21	341	
March 1875 Southeast tornado outbreak	101	3	5	7	0	19+	96+	377+	
April 1924 tornado outbreak	101	13	11	2	0	28+	114	1,166+	
Tornado outbreak of April 30 – May 2, 1967	101	21	4	4	0	38	13	90	
Tornado outbreak of November 17, 2013	101	23	7	2	0	77	8	190+	
Tornado outbreak of April 15–16, 1998	100	10	7	3	1	63	12	120	
1967 Oak Lawn tornado outbreak	99	17	3	5	0	45	58	1,418	
Tornado outbreak of May 22–27, 2008	98	14	9	1	1	173	13	215	
Tornado outbreak of April 1880	97	16	3	5	0	25+	166+	516+	
Tornado outbreak sequence of March 9–13, 2006	97	16	11	1	0	99	10	183	
Tornado outbreak of April 27–30, 2014	97	16	9	2	0	82	35	447	
Tornado outbreak and floods of April 2–7, 2025	96	33	6	0	0	157	9	47+	
Tornado outbreak sequence of May 8–12, 1959	95	20	7	2	0	60	7	34	
Tornado outbreak of April 12, 1945	94	7	5	4	1	17	128	1,001	
Tornado outbreak sequence of May 1971	94	22	8	1	0	76	6	242	
Tornado outbreak sequence of June 21–26, 1969	93	14	7	3	0	63	7	65+	
Tornado outbreak sequence of April 1996	93	19	11	0	0	118	6	200+	
Tornado outbreak of March 2–3, 2012	93	14	9	2	0	70	41	300+	
1953 Waco tornado outbreak	91	8	4	4	1	33	144	895	
Tornado outbreak of June 7–8, 1984	91	23	4	1	1	46	13	322	
Tornado outbreak sequence of May 7–11, 2008	91	23	5	2	0	120	25	419	
1979 Red River Valley tornado outbreak	90	25	4	2	0	61	58	1,927	
2002 Veterans Day weekend tornado outbreak	90	20	8	1	0	76	36	303	
Tornado outbreak of June 16–18, 2014	89	12	3	5	0	76	2	28	
Tornado outbreak of April 21–23, 1883	87	11	5	4	0	29+	122+	771+	
Tornado outbreak sequence of June 9–14, 1967	87	26	3	2	0	103	5	15+	
Tornado outbreak of April 25–28, 2024	87	16	7	2	0	162	6	156+	
Tornado outbreak sequence of March 26–31, 1961	86	18	10	0	0	47	3	80	
1913 Easter tornado outbreak	85	5	3	6	0	15+	192	853+	
Tornado outbreak of May 25–30, 2019	85	15	7	2	0	182	3	239	
Tornado outbreak of March 13–14, 1913	84	12	6	3	0	23+	76+	301+	
1936 Tupelo–Gainesville tornado outbreak	84	2	7	3	1	14+	454+	2,498+	
Tornado outbreak of November 23–24, 2001	83	19	3	3	0	69	13	219	
April 1920 tornado outbreak	82	6	2	6	0	17+	243+	1,374+	
Tornado outbreak of December 10–11, 2021	82	16	6	2	0	71	89	676	
1955 Great Plains tornado outbreak	81	13	3	1	2	48	102	554	
Tornado outbreak sequence of June 1966	81	18	2	2	1	57	18	543	
Tornado outbreak sequence of June 10–16, 1970	81	18	7	1	0	82	3	73	
Tornado outbreak of June 8, 1974	81	8	9	2	0	36	22	477	
Tornado outbreak of January 21–23, 1999	81	13	9	1	0	128	9	162	
1886 St. Cloud–Sauk Rapids tornado outbreak	80	10	4	4	0	18+	87+	324+	
1967 St. Louis tornado outbreak	80	15	6	2	0	30	7	268	
Tornado outbreak sequence of April 17–19, 1970	80	10	2	5	0	33	26	68	

==== Major outbreaks ====
There have been several tornado outbreaks which scored at least 30 points, but 79 or less on the OIS, reaching the status of "Major Outbreak".

Major outbreaks
Outbreak	OIS score	# of (E)F2s	# of (E)F3s	# of (E)F4s	# of (E)F5s	Total tornadoes	Deaths	Injuries	References
Tornado outbreak sequence of April 28 – May 2, 1953	79	7	3	5	0	24	36	361	
Tornado outbreak of April 9–11, 2009	79	12	9	1	0	85	5	112	
June 2010 Northern Plains tornado outbreak	78	9	4	4	0	93	3	43	
Tornado outbreak of April 28–30, 1963	77	16	7	1	0	37	13	72	
Tornado outbreak of April 18–21, 1974	76	18	6	1	0	36	2	1+	
Tornado outbreak of May 25–27, 2024	76	13	10	0	0	97	15	174	
Tornado outbreak of May 18–21, 2025	76	13	10	0	0	133	0	12+	
Tornado outbreak of June 1881	74	2	4	5	0	11+	20+	141+	
Tornado outbreak of March 28–31, 1976	73	14	5	2	0	35	10	1+	
Tornado outbreak of April 30 – May 1, 1949	71	8	9	1	0	24+	10	103	
March 1997 tornado outbreak	71	8	5	3	0	39	27	464	
Tornado outbreak of May 4–6, 2007	70	15	5	0	1	132	14	89	
Tornado outbreak of May 23–24, 1946	69	7	5	3	0	17+	4	42	
1980 Grand Island tornado outbreak	68	9	4	3	0	29	6	413	
Tornado outbreak sequence of May 22–26, 2016	68	9	8	1	0	98	0	11+	
Tornado outbreak of May 2, 1942	67	1	1	6	0	8+	31	172+	
Tornado outbreak of May 20–21, 1949	67	6	3	4	0	46+	56	0+	
Tornado outbreak of May 6–8, 1973	66	23	1	0	1	47	2	41	
Late-May 1998 tornado outbreak and derecho	66	13	6	1	0	60	7	233+	
Tornado outbreak of April 8–9, 1999	66	8	4	3	0	54	6	100	
Tornado outbreak of May 10–13, 2010	66	13	4	2	0	91	3	127	
December 2021 Midwest derecho and tornado outbreak	66	33	0	0	0	120	5	3	
Tornado outbreak of April 9, 1919	65	5	3	4	0	12	92+	412	
Tornado outbreak sequence of November 13–17, 1958	65	20	5	0	0	43	0	37	
Tornado outbreak of June 7–9, 1993	65	10	5	2	0	107	1	1+	
Tornado outbreak of February 21–22, 1971	64	7	3	2	1	19+	123	1,592	
Tornado outbreak of April 27–28, 2002	64	12	6	1	0	48	6	256	
Tornado outbreak of February 11–13, 1950	63	14	5	1	0	24	41+	228	
1975 Omaha tornado outbreak	63	14	3	2	0	36	3	137+	
1994 Palm Sunday tornado outbreak	63	4	7	2	0	29	40	491	
Tornado outbreak of February 28 – March 2, 2007	63	9	3	3	0	57	20	98	
Tornado outbreak sequence of June 3–11, 2008	63	14	5	1	0	192	7	84	
Tornado outbreak of March 12–15, 1953	62	11	6	1	0	23	21	72	
Tornado outbreak of April 23–27, 1970	62	11	6	1	0	34	3	26+	
Tornado outbreak of December 23–25, 1982	62	16	4	1	0	44	1	11+	
Tornado outbreak sequence of May 30 – June 3, 1954	61	18	3	1	0	39	9	65	
Tornado outbreak of April 8, 1957	61	8	5	2	0	18	7	203	
Tornado outbreak of December 17–21, 1967	61	13	5	1	0	30	6	110	
Tornado outbreak of April 21–24, 1968	61	8	2	2	1	26	14	525	
Tornado outbreak sequence of May 12–13, 1942	60	5	8	1	0	14	7	24	
Tornado outbreak sequence of December 1–6, 1953	60	10	3	1	1	19	49	404	
Tornado outbreak of April 2–4, 1968	60	15	2	2	0	31	12	0+	
Tornado outbreak of April 19–22, 1972	60	10	6	1	0	28	8	42	
Tri-State tornado outbreak	59	2	4	2	1	12+	751	2,298	
Tornado outbreak sequence of April 23–30, 1961	59	12	5	1	0	30	3	38	
Tornado outbreak sequence of June 17–23, 1964	59	12	5	1	0	52	0	37	
Tornado outbreak of March 25–26, 1949	58	9	4	2	0	15+	25+	180+	
Tornado outbreak sequence of April 26–30, 1971	58	9	4	2	0	30	10	187	
Tornado outbreak of April 22–25, 2010	58	9	4	2	0	88	10	184	
Tornado outbreak sequence of April 5–8, 1954	57	11	5	1	0	25	1	22	
Hurricane Carla tornado outbreak	57	6	7	1	0	21	14	337	
Tornado outbreak of March 13–17, 1982	57	11	7	0	0	23	4	1+	
Tornado outbreak sequence of May 15–16, 2025	57	11	3	2	0	55	27	38-45	
Tornado outbreak of February 5–6, 1942	56	18	4	0	0	22+	15	114	
Tornado outbreak of March 26, 1976	56	3	3	2	1	17	4	89	
Tornado outbreak sequence of April 12–18, 1960	55	10	7	0	0	37	4	60	
Tornado outbreak of April 28–30, 1947	54	7	4	2	0	13+	24+	0+	
Tornado outbreak sequence of July 1–10, 1955	54	7	2	3	0	28	4	48	
Tornado outbreak sequence of January 7–11, 2008	54	7	8	0	0	73	4	62	
Tornado outbreak of May 26–31, 2013	54	12	6	0	0	134	9	172	
Tornado outbreak of November 7–8, 1957	53	9	5	1	0	28	12	213	
Tornado outbreak sequence of March 4–8, 1961	53	14	5	0	0	44	2	152	
Tornado outbreak sequence of April 29 – May 2, 1972	53	4	7	1	0	21	0	12	
Tornado outbreak of November 20–21, 1900	52	6	4	2	0	14+	97+	388+	
Tornado outbreak of November 16–19, 1957	52	11	2	2	0	32	10	84	
1967 Hurricane Beulah tornado outbreak	52	6	8	0	0	120	5	41	
2009 South American tornado outbreak	52	6	4	2	0	28	15	1+	
Tornado outbreak of January 4–6, 1946	51	3	3	3	0	10+	47	412+	
Tornado outbreak of October 14–15, 1966	51	13	2	0	1	23	6	225	
Tornado outbreak of May 6–10, 2024	51	13	3	1	0	162	3	87-91+	
Tornado outbreak of January 29–30, 1947	50	10	4	1	0	15+	13+	24+	
Tornado outbreak sequence of May 12–17, 1957	50	10	4	1	0	50	23	105	
Tornado outbreak of May 18–21, 2013	50	5	1	2	1	78	26	229	
Tornado outbreak sequence of March 24–28, 2021	50	10	4	1	0	43	7	37+	
Tornado outbreak sequence of September 26–29, 1959	49	12	1	2	0	36	2	47	
2012 Leap Day tornado outbreak	49	17	1	1	0	42	15	193	
Tornado outbreak sequence of May 17–20, 1960	48	9	2	2	0	63	1	108	
2003 South Dakota tornado outbreak	48	9	2	2	0	125	2	19	
Tornado outbreak of January 3, 1949	47	6	5	1	0	14+	60+	504	
Tornado outbreak of March 24–25, 1954	47	16	1	1	0	28	2	11	
1944 Appalachians tornado outbreak	47	1	3	3	0	7+	154+	1,044	
Tornado outbreak of March 10–12, 1963	47	11	1	2	0	18	6	38	
Tornado outbreak of April 12–14, 1964	47	6	3	2	0	23	7	75	
1967 European tornado outbreak	47	1	4	1	1	8+	17	80+	
Tornado outbreak of December 1–3, 1982	47	6	7	0	0	38	2	0+	
2008 Atlanta tornado outbreak	47	16	3	0	0	46	3	53	
Tornado outbreak of June 5–6, 2010	47	11	3	1	0	53	8	68	
Tornado outbreak sequence of May 15–20, 1946	46	3	2	3	0	8+	8+	53+	
Tornado outbreak of June 3–4, 1958	46	3	1	2	1	13	28	175	
1997 Central Texas tornado outbreak	46	3	3	1	1	20	28	30	
Tornado outbreak of April 2, 2006	46	8	6	0	0	66	27	348	
Tornado outbreak of April 9–11, 2011	46	8	4	1	0	49	0	21	
Tornado outbreak sequence of May 5–10, 2015	46	8	6	0	0	127	5	67	
Tornado outbreak of March 16–18, 1965	45	5	5	1	0	24	2	129	
Tornado outbreak of June 13, 1976	45	5	2	1	1	16	2	1+	
Tornado outbreak of April 1977	45	10	2	0	1	22	24	158	
May 1989 tornado outbreak	45	5	1	3	0	16	7	168	
Tornado outbreak of November 22–24, 2004	45	15	3	0	0	104	4	39	
Tornado outbreak of October 17–19, 2007	45	15	3	0	0	63	5	28	
Tornado outbreak of March 28–31, 2007	45	10	5	0	0	81	5	26	
Tornado outbreak sequence of April 19–24, 2011	45	15	1	1	0	134	0	14	
Tornado outbreak of April 4–7, 2022	45	10	3	1	0	89	1	17+	
Tornado outbreak of December 12–15, 2022	45	20	1	0	0	77	3	64	
Tornado outbreak sequence of April 21–24, 1955	44	12	2	1	0	27	6	29	
Tornado outbreak of December 14–15, 1971	44	17	2	0	0	40	2	119	
Tornado outbreak of April 25–27, 1982	44	7	6	0	0	13+	0	0+	
Tornado outbreak of November 4–5, 2022	44	7	2	2	0	31	2	34+	
1929 Rye Cove tornado outbreak	43	9	5	0	0	17	42+	323+	
Great Storm of 1975	43	14	1	1	0	45	12	377	
Tornado outbreak of April 23, 2000	43	14	3	0	0	33	0	12	
Tornado outbreak of June 18–22, 2011	43	9	5	0	0	78	0	4	
Tornado outbreak of December 16–17, 2019	43	9	5	0	0	41	3	14+	
Tornado outbreak sequence of April 2–8, 1964	42	11	1	0	1	33	7	119	
Tornado outbreak of November 25–27, 1965	42	6	6	0	0	18	1	26	
Tornado outbreak of February 22–24, 1975	42	11	2	1	0	23	3	1+	
Tornado outbreak of May 22–23, 1981	42	11	2	1	0	43	0	12	
Tornado outbreak of May 7–10, 2016	42	6	4	1	0	57	2	19	
1947 Glazier–Higgins–Woodward tornado outbreak	41	8	0	1	1	12+	185+	990+	
Tornado outbreak of May 24–25, 1957	41	8	3	1	0	45	4	10	
Tornado outbreak of April 28–30, 1960	41	8	5	0	0	19	3	79	
Tornado outbreak of April 19, 1976	41	8	2	0	1	16	0	11	
Hurricane Ivan tornado outbreak	41	18	1	0	0	120	7	24+	
Tornado outbreak of April 13–16, 2012	41	3	5	1	0	113	6	101	
Tornado outbreak of February 28 – March 1, 2017	41	8	3	1	0	71	4	38	
Tornado outbreak of March 21–23, 2022	41	13	3	0	0	85	3	68	
1936 Cordele–Greensboro tornado outbreak	40	5	0	3	0	13+	49+	149+	
Tornado outbreak of April 18, 1969	40	5	4	1	0	15	2	0+	
Tornado outbreak of April 25–27, 1994	40	10	0	2	0	101	6	1+	
Tornado outbreak of April 13–15, 2019	40	15	2	0	0	75	3	65	
Tornado outbreak of March 12–13, 1961	39	12	3	0	0	25	2	84	
Tornado outbreak of September 24–25, 1973	39	2	5	1	0	8	3	66	
Tornado outbreak of April 6–9, 1998	39	7	2	0	1	62	41	250+	
Tornado outbreak of November 15, 2005	39	7	3	1	0	49	1	108	
Tornado outbreak of November 27–28, 2005	39	12	3	0	0	73	2	15	
Tornado outbreak of April 30 – May 2, 2010	39	12	3	0	0	60	5	31	
Tornado outbreak of May 17–18, 2019	39	7	5	0	0	46	0	4	
Tornado outbreak of May 20–23, 2019	39	7	5	0	0	114	4	37	
Tornado outbreak of June 4–5, 1955	38	4	2	2	0	46	0	0	
Tornado outbreak sequence of May 12–14, 1956	38	9	0	2	0	19	4	162	
Tornado outbreak of March 31 – April 2, 1959	38	4	4	1	0	17	7	83	
Tornado outbreak of July 1–3, 1997	38	9	4	0	0	52	2	100	
Tornado outbreak of March 6–8, 1956	37	11	1	1	0	17	1	42	
Tornado outbreak of February 13, 1952	37	6	3	1	0	15	5	102	
Tornado outbreak sequence of April 1–6, 1958	37	6	5	0	0	32	3	40	
Tornado outbreak of May 10, 1985	37	1	3	2	0	10	0+	0+	
Tornado outbreak of May 30 – June 1, 1999	37	6	5	0	0	59	3	1+	
Tornado outbreak of April 10–11, 2001	37	16	1	0	0	79	4	18	
Tornado outbreak of January 21–23, 2017	37	11	3	0	0	81	20	204	
Tornado outbreak of March 24–27, 2023	37	6	3	1	0	35	23	236	
Tornado outbreak of March 20–21, 1913	36	13	0	1	0	16+	53	156+	
1944 South Dakota–Minnesota tornado outbreak	36	3	1	1	1	6+	13+	560+	
Tornado outbreak of February 12, 1945	36	3	4	1	0	8	45	427	
Tornado outbreak of October 29–30, 1956	36	3	4	1	0	16	0	7	
Tornado outbreak of August 6, 1969	36	8	2	1	0	14	15+	109	
March 1917 tornado outbreak	35	5	3	1	0	9+	47+	300+	
Tornado outbreak of November 15–16, 1955	35	5	5	0	0	18	1	35	
Tornado outbreak of April 1–2, 1974	35	10	3	0	0	23	4	72	
1985 Hurricane Danny tornado outbreak	35	10	3	0	0	46	1	7+	
Tornado outbreak of May 1–3, 2008	35	10	3	0	0	60	6	45	
Tornado outbreak of March 9–11, 1973	34	7	2	1	0	16	7	132	
Tornado outbreak of March 10–12, 1986	34	12	2	0	0	41	6	122	
Tornado outbreak of June 2, 1998	34	7	2	1	0	33	22	77	
2008 Poland tornado outbreak	34	2	4	1	0	12	2	55+	
Tornado outbreak sequence of June 14–19, 2023	34	12	2	0	0	93	4	120	
Tornado outbreak of May 17, 1949	33	4	3	1	0	8+	1+	0+	
Tornado outbreak sequence of January 21–22, 1957	33	9	1	1	0	16	13	31	
Tornado outbreak sequence of August 24–31, 1964	33	9	1	1	0	26	2	12	
Tornado outbreak of February 11, 1965	33	9	3	0	0	15	0	28	
Tornado outbreak of December 16, 2000	33	9	1	1	0	24	12	186	
2010 New Year's Eve tornado outbreak	33	4	5	0	0	37	9	32	
Tornado outbreak of March 29–31, 2022	33	9	3	0	0	90	2	17	
Great Blue Norther of November 11, 1911	32	6	2	1	0	13+	16	101+	
Tornado outbreak of May 11, 1947	32	1	4	1	0	6	1	22	
Tornado outbreak sequence of May 27 – June 2, 1958	32	11	2	0	0	23	0	3	
Tornado outbreak of April 14–15, 1965	32	6	4	0	0	16	1	58	
Tornado outbreak sequence of September 20–23, 1965	32	6	4	0	0	26	0	4	
Tornado outbreak of April 12–13, 1967	32	16	0	0	0	30	0	9	
Tornado outbreak of January 12, 2023	32	11	2	0	0	44	8	53	
Tornado outbreak of May 19–22, 2024	32	6	2	1	0	81	5	69+	
Tornado outbreak and derecho of June 19–22, 2025	32	6	1	0	1	41	7	2+	
1881 Minnesota tornado outbreak	31	3	1	2	0	6+	24	123+	
Tornado outbreak of September 29, 1927	31	8	3	0	0	15	82+	620+	
St. Louis tornado outbreak of February 1959	31	3	3	1	0	17	21	358	
Tornado outbreak of June 22–24, 1960	31	8	3	0	0	18	0	10	
Tornado outbreak of March 4, 1964	31	3	3	1	0	8	4	44	
1984 Soviet Union tornado outbreak	31	3	1	2	0	11	403	804	
November 1989 tornado outbreak	31	8	1	1	0	40	30	523	
Tornado outbreak of September 21–23, 2006	31	8	1	1	0	48	0	14+	
October 2013 North American storm complex	31	3	1	2	0	22	3	17+	
Tornado outbreak and floods of April 28 – May 1, 2017	31	8	1	1	0	75	5	70	
Tornado outbreak of February 24–25, 1956	30	10	0	1	0	23	6	47	
Tornado outbreak of February 26–27, 1958	30	5	4	0	0	16	13	92	
Tornado outbreak of March 26–27, 1950	30	10	2	0	0	16	1	52	
Tornado outbreak sequence of June 20–23, 1957	30	5	1	0	1	23	11	105	
Tornado outbreak of May 4–6, 1959	30	15	0	0	0	50	0	2	
Tornado outbreak of December 10–11, 1967	30	10	2	0	0	22	2	103	
Tornado outbreak of March 12, 1971	30	0	4	1	0	10	1	5	
1978 Bossier City tornado outbreak	30	5	2	1	0	11	5	277	
May 2009 Southern Midwest derecho	30	10	2	0	0	39	4	5+	
Late-May 2010 tornado outbreak	30	10	0	1	0	80	0	0	
Tornado outbreak of December 23–25, 2015	30	5	2	1	0	38	13	77	
Tornado outbreak of February 23–24, 2016	30	5	4	0	0	61	7	136	
August 2017 Chinese tornado family	30	0	0	3	0	3	5	58+	
Tornado outbreak sequence of June 20–26, 2023	30	10	2	0	0	114	5	126	
Tornado outbreak and derecho of June 9-11, 2026	30	5	4	0	0	98	0	14	

== See also ==
- Baron Tornado Index
- List of F5, EF5, and IF5 tornadoes
- Tornado records
- Wind engineering
