= Tornado outbreak of May 20–22, 1949 =

Tornado outbreak in the United States

Tornado outbreak
- Tornadoes: ≥ 66
- Max. rating: F4 tornado
- Duration: May 20–22, 1949

Overall effects
- Fatalities: 57
- Injuries: 558
- Damage: $9,330,500 ($126,260,000 in 2025 USD) (Note: All losses are in 1949 USD unless otherwise noted.)
- Areas affected: Central and Eastern United States
- Part of the tornadoes and tornado outbreaks of 1949

From May 20–22, 1949, a large-scale tornado outbreak affected portions of the continental United States, killing several dozen people and injuring hundreds more. Generating at least 66 tornadoes, the severe weather event produced 51 or more significant—F2 or stronger—tornadoes, half a dozen of which were retroactively rated F4 by tornado expert Thomas P. Grazulis. One of the largest on record prior to the start of official data in 1950, the outbreak included many tornado families and unrecorded or weak tornadoes, so its actual total was likely considerably higher than noted here. Newspaper headlines mentioned an "army" of tornadoes in Kansas on May 20. More than 100 tornadoes in all, mainly weak, may have formed over the Great Plains that day; Grazulis was able to find 40 just in Kansas "with little effort". (Note: An outbreak is generally defined as a group of at least six tornadoes (the number sometimes varies slightly according to local climatology) with no more than a six-hour gap between individual tornadoes. An outbreak sequence, prior to (after) the start of modern records in 1950, is defined as a period of no more than two (one) consecutive days without at least one significant (F2 or stronger) tornado.)

== Outbreak statistics ==
Daily statistics of tornadoes during the tornado outbreak sequence of May 20–22, 1949
Date (Note: All dates are based on the local time zone where the tornado touched down; however, all times are in Coordinated Universal Time and dates are split at midnight CST/CDT for consistency.)	Total	F-scale rating (Note: The Fujita scale was devised under the aegis of scientist T. Theodore Fujita in the early 1970s. Prior to the advent of the scale in 1971, tornadoes in the United States were officially unrated. Tornado ratings were retroactively applied to events prior to the formal adoption of the F-scale by the National Weather Service. While the Fujita scale has been superseded by the Enhanced Fujita scale in the U.S. since February 1, 2007, Canada used the old scale until April 1, 2013; nations elsewhere, like the United Kingdom, apply other classifications such as the TORRO scale.)							Deaths	Injuries	Damage (Note: The National Oceanic and Atmospheric Administration's Storm Data publication does not list exact damage totals for every event, instead giving damage categories. As such, damage for individual tornadoes is not comprehensive.)
Date	Total	FU	F0	F1	F2	F3	F4	F5	Deaths	Injuries	Damage
May 20	36	9	?	?	17	9	1	0	4	57	$1,391,500
May 21	24	4	?	?	11	4	5	0	52	491	$6,854,000
May 22	6	2	?	?	4	0	0	0	1	10	$1,085,000
Total	66	15	?	?	32	13	6	0	57	558	$9,330,500

== Confirmed tornadoes ==
Confirmed tornadoes by Fujita rating
FU	F0	F1	F2	F3	F4	F5	Total
15	?	?	32	13	6	0	≥ 66

Prior to 1990, there is a likely undercount of tornadoes, particularly E/F0–1, with reports of weaker tornadoes becoming more common as population increased. A sharp increase in the annual average E/F0–1 count by approximately 200 tornadoes was noted upon the implementation of NEXRAD Doppler weather radar in 1990–1991. (Note: Historically, the number of tornadoes globally and in the United States was and is likely underrepresented: research by Grazulis on annual tornado activity suggests that, as of 2001, only 53% of yearly U.S. tornadoes were officially recorded. Documentation of tornadoes outside the United States was historically less exhaustive, owing to the lack of monitors in many nations and, in some cases, to internal political controls on public information. Most countries only recorded tornadoes that produced severe damage or loss of life. Significant low biases in U.S. tornado counts likely occurred through the early 1990s, when advanced NEXRAD was first installed and the National Weather Service began comprehensively verifying tornado occurrences.) 1974 marked the first year where significant tornado (E/F2+) counts became homogenous with contemporary values, attributed to the consistent implementation of Fujita scale assessments. Numerous discrepancies on the details of tornadoes in this outbreak exist between sources. The total count of tornadoes and ratings differs from various agencies accordingly. The list below documents information from the most contemporary official sources alongside assessments from tornado historian Thomas P. Grazulis.

=== May 20 event ===
Confirmed tornadoes – Friday, May 20, 1949
F#	Location	County / Parish	State	Time (UTC)	Path length	Width (Note: The listed width values are primarily the average/mean width of the tornadoes, with those having known maximum widths denoted by ♯. From 1952 to 1994, reports largely list mean width whereas contemporary years list maximum width. Values provided by Grazulis are the average width, with estimates being rounded down (i.e. 0.5 mi (0.80 km) is rounded down from 880 yards to 800 yards.)	Damage
F3	Beecher Island (CO) to near Haigler (NE)	Yuma (CO), Cheyenne (KS), Dundy (NE)	Colorado, Kansas, Nebraska	19:15–?	30 mi (48 km)	400 yd (370 m)	$35,000
F3	This and the following tornado family successively paralleled each other. The first event destroyed many barns and a pair of homes. A truck was hit, forcing its drivers to shelter beneath, and a barn in transit blown away "like paper". One person was injured.						
F3	S of Wray (CO) to W of Benkelman (NE)	Yuma (CO), Cheyenne (KS), Dundy (NE)	Colorado, Kansas, Nebraska	21:30–?	40 mi (64 km)	400 yd (370 m)	$100,000
F3	Forming over Black Wolf Canyon, this event struck four farmsteads in Colorado, wrecking 12 structures and splintering 150 utility poles. Crossing into Kansas and Nebraska, the tornado family destroyed many barns, hitting at least six farms. One injury occurred.						
F3	E of Bird City	Cheyenne	Kansas	21:30–?	10 mi (16 km)	Unknown	Unknown
F3	This tornado leveled all but a corner of a farmhouse. A few injuries occurred.						
F2	N of McDonald	Rawlins	Kansas	21:30–?	4 mi (6.4 km)	Unknown	Unknown
F2	Barns were wrecked.						
FU	Unknown	Rawlins	Kansas	21:30–22:30	Unknown	Unknown	Unknown
FU	This was one of four narrow, weak tornadoes to hit the county.						
FU	Unknown	Rawlins	Kansas	21:30–22:30	Unknown	Unknown	Unknown
FU	This was one of four narrow, weak tornadoes to hit the county.						
FU	Unknown	Rawlins	Kansas	21:30–22:30	Unknown	Unknown	Unknown
FU	This was one of four narrow, weak tornadoes to hit the county.						
FU	Unknown	Rawlins	Kansas	21:30–22:30	Unknown	Unknown	Unknown
FU	This was one of four narrow, weak tornadoes to hit the county.						
F2	W of Oberlin	Decatur	Kansas	22:15–?	4 mi (6.4 km)	50 yd (46 m)	Unknown
F2	This tornado struck six farmsteads, wrecking structures.						
F3	S of Scott City to Healy	Scott, Lane	Kansas	22:15–?	25 mi (40 km)	200 yd (180 m)	$100,000
F3	This tornado unroofed three or more farmhouses and destroyed outbuildings or barns on nine farmsteads. 12 homes were badly damaged at Healy, one of which was destroyed.						
F2	SW to SE of Lipscomb	Lipscomb	Texas	22:54–?	4 mi (6.4 km)	100 yd (91 m)	Unknown
F2	This tornado unroofed a combined store and post office. A barn and home were wrecked as well.						
F3	SSE of Healy to NW of Shields	Lane	Kansas	23:00–?	10 mi (16 km)	200 yd (180 m)	Unknown
F3	This tornado hit five farmsteads, destroying and scattering a farmhouse.						
F2	Near Goin	Claiborne	Tennessee	23:00–?	5 mi (8.0 km)	Unknown	$37,000
F2	This tornado destroyed three barns and five homes along Barren Creek. Three people were injured.						
F2	N of Copeland to western Rozel	Gray, Ford, Hodgeman, Pawnee	Kansas	23:30–?	85 mi (137 km)	100 yd (91 m)	$175,000
F2	A family of at least eight tornadoes, this event produced sporadic damage. 70 homes received damage at Rozel, and rural farmhouses lost their roofs. "Hundreds" of animals died in the path, and four people were injured. The tornado also tracked near Hanston and Howell. Many funnel clouds were observed, four near Dodge City.						
F2	Balko to southern Beaver	Beaver	Oklahoma	23:30–?	15 mi (24 km)	Unknown	$1,500
F2	1 death – This was a family of at least three tornadoes. A farmhouse was wrecked, and other homes were unroofed.						
F2	Lipscomb (TX) to N of Woodward (OK)	Lipscomb (TX), Ellis (OK), Woodward (OK)	Texas, Oklahoma	00:15–?	55 mi (89 km)	100 yd (91 m)	$250,000
F2	This tornado family first unroofed a store and other structures in Texas. Entering Oklahoma, it damaged a hangar and aircraft at Gage Airport. Farms were extensively damaged in the Tangier–Shattuck area, and barns were wrecked near Fargo. Most of the damage was to Woodward Army Air Field, now West Woodward Airport, where a few large warehouses and 11 aircraft were torn apart, resulting in three injuries.						
F2	SW of Coldwater to Wilmore	Comanche	Kansas	01:30–?	19 mi (31 km)	100 yd (91 m)	$200,000
F2	A large tornado damaged "the entire town" of Wilmore.						
F3	Near Catesby	Ellis	Oklahoma	01:30–?	Unknown	100 yd (91 m)	$8,000
F3	1 death – This tornado leveled a farmstead. The dead, a woman, was carried 300 yd (900 ft) and her husband injured.						
F2	SE of Lincoln	Lincoln	Kansas	01:45–?	4 mi (6.4 km)	50 yd (46 m)	$10,000
F2	This tornado wrecked windmills, small outbuildings, and a home. Trees were downed and snapped as well.						
F2	Yewed to ENE of Nash	Alfalfa, Grant	Oklahoma	01:45–?	25 mi (40 km)	400 yd (370 m)	$150,000
F2	1 death – This was either a family of tornadoes or two unrelated events. Businesses and homes were destroyed at Nash. The tornado felled a grain elevator, fatally crushing a man below. 27 injuries occurred.						
F2	E of Woodward	Woodward	Oklahoma	02:00–?	2 mi (3.2 km)	75 yd (69 m)	Unknown
F2	This tornado tore the roof off a home and wrecked a barn.						
F4	SW of Gypsum to NE of Solomon	Saline, Dickinson	Kansas	02:00–02:30	25 mi (40 km)	400 yd (370 m)	$35,000
F4	1 death – This tornado only hit a few farms, obliterating a farmhouse. A railroad bridge was partly wrecked as well. The tornado killed a motorist whose automobile was lofted 200 yd (600 ft). Businesses and homes in Solomon received F2 damage. Five injuries occurred.						
F3	Near Hope to N of Junction City	Dickinson, Geary	Kansas	02:15–?	30 mi (48 km)	400 yd (370 m)	Unknown
F3	Barns were shattered and one or two homes destroyed. About six other homes were shorn of their roofs. The tornado killed 5,000 chickens as well, blew away sheds, and downed power lines.						
F2	SW to NE of Mooreland	Woodward	Oklahoma	02:30–?	8 mi (13 km)	70 yd (64 m)	$14,000
F2	This tornado, part of the Lipscomb–Gage family, unroofed four homes and wrecked a filling station.						
F2	SE of Hammon to N of Thomas	Custer	Oklahoma	02:30–?	35 mi (56 km)	100 yd (91 m)	$120,000
F2	This tornado wrecked many barns and five farmhouses, shifting several of the latter on their foundations. 13 of 14 cattle were carried aloft 1/4 mi (0.40 km), audible in midair, but uninjured. Downbursts damaged 25 homes in Thomas. Three people were injured.						
F2	W of Vici	Ellis	Oklahoma	02:30–?	Unknown	Unknown	Unknown
F2	This tornado unroofed and destroyed four homes.						
F2	Belva to E of Waynoka	Woodward, Woods	Oklahoma	02:45–?	20 mi (32 km)	Unknown	Unknown
F2	This event, related to the Mooreland F2, may have been two or three tornadoes. Barns were destroyed on two or more farmsteads.						
F2	Chase	Rice	Kansas	02:45–?	1 mi (1.6 km)	Unknown	Unknown
F2	This tornado damaged eight homes, unroofed one, and destroyed another. Four injuries occurred.						
F3	W of Waynoka to near Hopeton	Woodward, Woods	Oklahoma	03:00–?	30 mi (48 km)	100 yd (91 m)	$56,000
F3	This tornado struck nine farms, obliterating three of them. One farm lost 40 head of cattle. Two vehicles—a pickup truck and a car—were carried 1/2 mi (0.80 km).						
F2	SE of Watonga to S of Loyal to near Dover	Blaine, Kingfisher	Oklahoma	03:00–?	27 mi (43 km)	Unknown	Unknown
F2	This tornado, part of a 55-mile-long (89 km) family, destroyed or damaged structures on 20 farmsteads, leveling an incomplete home.						
FU	SW of Wellington	Sumner	Kansas	03:00–?	Unknown	Unknown	Unknown
FU	Rural barns and farmhouses were damaged.						
F3	NW of Emporia to Allen to E of Eskridge	Lyon, Wabaunsee	Kansas	03:45–?	30 mi (48 km)	300 yd (270 m)	$75,000
F3	This intense, nocturnal tornado struck 29 farms and caused F3 damage to homes at two locations. Sheds, barns, and utility poles were wrecked. Three people were injured.						
FU	E of Hopeton (1st tornado)	Woods	Oklahoma	Unknown	Unknown	Unknown	Unknown
FU	This and the following tornado were related to the Waynoka F3.						
FU	E of Hopeton (2nd tornado)	Woods	Oklahoma	Unknown	Unknown	Unknown	Unknown
FU	This and the preceding tornado were related to the Waynoka F3.						
FU	S to E of Stillwater	Payne	Oklahoma	Unknown	18 mi (29 km)	Unknown	$15,000
FU	Farmhouses were badly damaged.						
FU	E of Salamonia	Jay	Indiana	Unknown	3 mi (4.8 km)	440 yd (400 m)	$10,000
FU	Details are unavailable.						

=== May 21 event ===
Confirmed tornadoes – Saturday, May 21, 1949
F#	Location	County / Parish	State	Time (UTC)	Path length	Width	Damage
F2	NW of Watonga to NW of Hitchcock	Blaine	Oklahoma	05:30–?	12 mi (19 km)	Unknown	$10,000
F2	This tornado severely damaged five farmsteads, tearing apart and scattering a small farmhouse.						
F4	SW of Greenfield to Etna	Blaine	Oklahoma	05:30–?	15 mi (24 km)	400 yd (370 m)	$70,000
F4	1 death – This tornado destroyed or damaged 13 or more farmhouses, only one of which it obliterated. Seven people were injured.						
F3	SW of Cleveland	Pawnee, Osage	Oklahoma	06:15–?	5 mi (8.0 km)	Unknown	$100,000
F3	This tornado wrecked a few homes. Several others were either shifted on their foundations or shorn of their roofs. An oil refinery was damaged as well. One minor injury occurred.						
F2	Near Oologah	Rogers	Oklahoma	06:30–?	Unknown	200 yd (180 m)	$4,000
F2	This tornado destroyed a barn. A fallen tree injured a person.						
F2	N of Claremore to Chelsea to Estella	Rogers, Craig	Oklahoma	06:45–?	18 mi (29 km)	150 yd (140 m)	$50,000
F2	This tornado unroofed or collapsed several buildings. An injury occurred.						
F2	Big Cabin	Craig	Oklahoma	07:07–?	Unknown	Unknown	Unknown
F2	Six barns were destroyed and a home unroofed. A gym lost part of its roof as well.						
FU	White Oak	Craig	Oklahoma	~07:07–07:10	3 mi (4.8 km)	Unknown	Unknown
FU	Details are unavailable.						
FU	S of Vinita	Craig	Oklahoma	~07:07–07:10	Unknown	Unknown	Unknown
FU	Details are unavailable. This tornado paralleled the next event.						
F2	Southern Vinita	Craig	Oklahoma	07:10–?	Unknown	100 yd (91 m)	$30,000
F2	A pavilion and farmhouse lost their roofs. Other structures received damage as well.						
FU	N of Mountain Grove	Wright	Missouri	10:30–?	Unknown	880 yd (800 m)	Unknown
FU	Most of the damage was to trees. A chicken coop, a home, a garage, and a few barns were damaged as well.						
F2	Witt Springs	Estill	Kentucky	17:30–?	6 mi (9.7 km)	150 yd (140 m)	Unknown
F2	This tornado destroyed or damaged three barns and a pair of homes.						
F3	Near New Hartford to SE of Clarksville	Pike	Missouri	21:30–?	20 mi (32 km)	200 yd (180 m)	$200,000
F3	1 death – This tornado destroyed 14 homes and 31 other buildings. Nine other homes and 26 other buildings received damage. 20 injuries occurred.						
F2	Pittsburg	Van Buren	Iowa	22:00–?	0.5 mi (0.80 km)	400 yd (370 m)	$30,000
F2	This tornado struck eight homes, unroofing a few of them. Other structures were destroyed or damaged as well.						
F2	S of Washington	Franklin	Missouri	22:00–?	5 mi (8.0 km)	Unknown	Unknown
F2	This tornado destroyed 21 outbuildings and four barns. It also damaged 11 other buildings, a barn, and a trio of homes.						
F3	Eastern Terre Haute to SW of Burnett	Vigo	Indiana	22:05–?	8 mi (13 km)	200 yd (180 m)	$250,000
F3	3 deaths – Forming near Cox Field, now Terre Haute Regional Airport, this tornado hit 10 homes. 10 injuries occurred.						
F4	NE of Graysville to northwestern Shelburn to N of Jordan	Sullivan, Clay, Owen	Indiana	22:15–?	40 mi (64 km)	150 yd (140 m)	$1,000,000
F4	14 deaths – This extremely violent tornado wrecked farmhouses at six locations, particularly south of Bowling Green and Lewis. 160 homes at Shelburn were torn apart, many leveled, and 13 people were killed. The tornado hit a cabin on the Eel River, causing an additional death, and killed "hundreds" of animals as well. 251 people were injured. The path may have continued as far as Cloverdale.						
F2	Lambert Field	St. Louis	Missouri	22:30–?	Unknown	Unknown	Unknown
F2	This tornado unroofed a few homes. Aircraft and approximately 16 other homes received damage, along with trees. A few injuries occurred.						
F2	SSW of Mount Sterling	Brown	Illinois	22:30–?	12 mi (19 km)	200 yd (180 m)	$40,000
F2	This tornado struck eight farms, unroofing homes and destroying barns.						
F4	E of Florissant (MO) to Wood River (IL) to Livingston (IL)	St. Louis (MO), St. Charles (MO), Madison (IL)	Missouri, Illinois	22:50–?	30 mi (48 km)	880 yd (800 m)♯	$1,500,000
F4	5 deaths – This intense tornado, related to the Washington–Lambert Field family, produced F3 damage at Spanish Lake, Missouri, before hitting Wood River and northern Roxana, Illinois. Up to 35% of the homes in these areas, 300 in all, were destroyed or damaged, along with "several hundred" other buildings, but F4 impacts were confined to a small section of Wood River, principally 6th Street. Farther on, F1 and F2 damage occurred at Worden and Livingston. A few trailer parks were destroyed as well, along with 500 acres (200 ha) of woodland, and an oil refinery was severely damaged. 50 head of livestock were killed, and 55 people were injured.						
F4	SW of Palestine (IL) to NW of Sullivan (IN)	Crawford (IL), Sullivan (IN)	Illinois, Indiana	23:00–?	8 mi (13 km)	50 yd (46 m)	$70,000
F4	4 deaths – This violent tornado damaged 20 buildings and destroyed three homes. The tornado obliterated a restaurant, killing four patrons. One of the dead was found in a "distant" tree. Cars were tossed up to 300 yd (900 ft) as well, and a pumping station was wrecked. Seven injuries occurred. A National Climatic Data Center (NCDC) technical report in 1999 listed this tornado as an F5, but Grazulis considered it an F4 in 1993 and 2001.						
F2	N of West Point	Lee	Iowa	23:30–?	4 mi (6.4 km)	Unknown	Unknown
F2	Five farms were extensively impacted. 10 hogs were killed and a barn was wrecked. A brick home lost its roof as well.						
F3	N of Marble Hill to E of Oak Ridge	Bollinger, Cape Girardeau	Missouri	23:45–?	15 mi (24 km)	250 yd (230 m)	Unknown
F3	1 death – This intense tornado destroyed 14 outbuildings, seven barns, and seven homes. Six other homes and another building received damage. Six injuries occurred.						
F4	Northwestern Cape Girardeau	Cape Girardeau (MO), Alexander (IL)	Missouri, Illinois	00:55–?	10 mi (16 km)	200 yd (180 m)	$3,500,000
F4	23 deaths – This was the most destructive tornado in Missouri since September 29, 1927, despite only impacting the fringe of town. It leveled "dozens" of homes on the outskirts of Cape Girardeau, destroying 203 in all and damaging 231 others. 33 businesses were destroyed or damaged as well, and a church was badly damaged. The tornado then crossed the Mississippi River, only damaging trees in Illinois. 130 people were injured, many severely.						
FU	Marked Tree	Poinsett	Arkansas	03:30–?	Unknown	400 yd (370 m)	Unknown
FU	A "small" tornado felled trees, damaged homes, and tore the roof off a cotton gin.						

=== May 22 event ===
Confirmed tornadoes – Sunday, May 22, 1949
F#	Location	County / Parish	State	Time (UTC)	Path length	Width	Damage
FU	Somerset	Pulaski	Kentucky	07:00–07:05	Unknown	440 yd (400 m)	$750,000
FU	1 death – This tornado coincided with an hour-long period of "high" wind. A few large garages were damaged, along with many dwellings. A wholesale grocery store and a tobacco warehouse were wrecked as well. This event may have been a downburst.						
FU	Red Boiling Springs	Macon	Tennessee	08:00–?	Unknown	Unknown	$300,000
FU	This tornado felled trees and leveled barns. Homes were shorn of their roofs and torn apart as well. Much livestock was injured or killed.						
F2	Northern Abilene	Taylor	Texas	00:15–?	1 mi (1.6 km)	100 yd (91 m)	$35,000
F2	Officially a severe wind at the time, this tornado affected 10 blocks, destroying or unroofing seven homes. 30 other homes received damage, and five people were injured.						
F2	SW of Clayton to N of Hosensack	Berks, Montgomery, Lehigh	Pennsylvania	00:30–?	7 mi (11 km)	200 yd (180 m)	Unknown
F2	This tornado unroofed a hosiery plant and ripped the topmost floor off a three-story apartment. It also tore utility poles loose, wrecked barns, and destroyed five chicken coops. Five injuries occurred.						
F2	Cauthornville	King and Queen	Virginia	01:00–?	1.5 mi (2.4 km)	400 yd (370 m)	Unknown
F2	This tornado wrecked barns and outbuildings.						
F2	Harrisburg to near Hummelstown	Dauphin	Pennsylvania	01:30–?	8 mi (13 km)	Unknown	Unknown
F2	This tornado damaged several barns and tore the roof off a home.						

== Sources ==
- Agee, Ernest M.; Childs, Samuel (June 1, 2014). "Adjustments in Tornado Counts, F-Scale Intensity, and Path Width for Assessing Significant Tornado Destruction". Journal of Applied Meteorology and Climatology. 53 (6). American Meteorological Society: 1494–1505. Bibcode:2014JApMC..53.1494A. doi:10.1175/JAMC-D-13-0235.1.
- Brooks, Harold E. (April 2004). "On the Relationship of Tornado Path Length and Width to Intensity". Weather and Forecasting. 19 (2): 310–19. Bibcode:2004WtFor..19..310B. doi:10.1175/1520-0434(2004)019<0310:OTROTP>2.0.CO;2.
- Cook, A. R.; Schaefer, J. T. (August 2008). "The Relation of El Niño–Southern Oscillation (ENSO) to Winter Tornado Outbreaks". Monthly Weather Review. 136 (8): 3121–3137. Bibcode:2008MWRv..136.3121C. doi:10.1175/2007MWR2171.1.
- Edwards, Roger; LaDue, James G.; Ferree, John T.; Scharfenberg, Kevin; Maier, Chris; Coulbourne, William L. (May 1, 2013). "Tornado Intensity Estimation: Past, Present, and Future". Bulletin of the American Meteorological Society. 94 (5). American Meteorological Society: 641–653. Bibcode:2013BAMS...94..641E. doi:10.1175/BAMS-D-11-00006.1.
- Grazulis, Thomas P. (May 1984). Violent Tornado Climatography, 1880–1982. OSTI (Technical report). NUREG. Washington, D.C.: Nuclear Regulatory Commission. OSTI 7099491. CR-3670.
  - — (November 1990). Significant Tornadoes 1880–1989. Vol. 2. St. Johnsbury, Vermont: The Tornado Project of Environmental Films. ISBN 1-879362-02-3.
  - — (July 1993). Significant Tornadoes 1680–1991: A Chronology and Analysis of Events. St. Johnsbury, Vermont: The Tornado Project of Environmental Films. ISBN 1-879362-03-1.
  - — (2001a). The Tornado: Nature's Ultimate Windstorm. Norman: University of Oklahoma Press. ISBN 978-0-8061-3538-0.
  - — (2001b). F5-F6 Tornadoes. St. Johnsbury, Vermont: The Tornado Project of Environmental Films.
- Lott, Neal; McCown, Sam; Ross, Tom (August 2000) [November 1999]. 1998-1999 tornadoes and a long-term U.S. tornado climatology (Technical report). National Climatic Data Center Technical Report. Asheville, North Carolina: National Climatic Data Center. pp. 10–17. 99-02 – via NOAA Central Library.
- "Severe Local Storms for May 1949". Monthly Weather Review. 77 (5). Washington, D.C.: United States Weather Bureau: 156–64. May 1949. doi:10.1175/1520-0493(1949)077<0156:SSFM>2.0.CO;2 – via American Meteorological Society.
