= Tornadoes of 1949 =

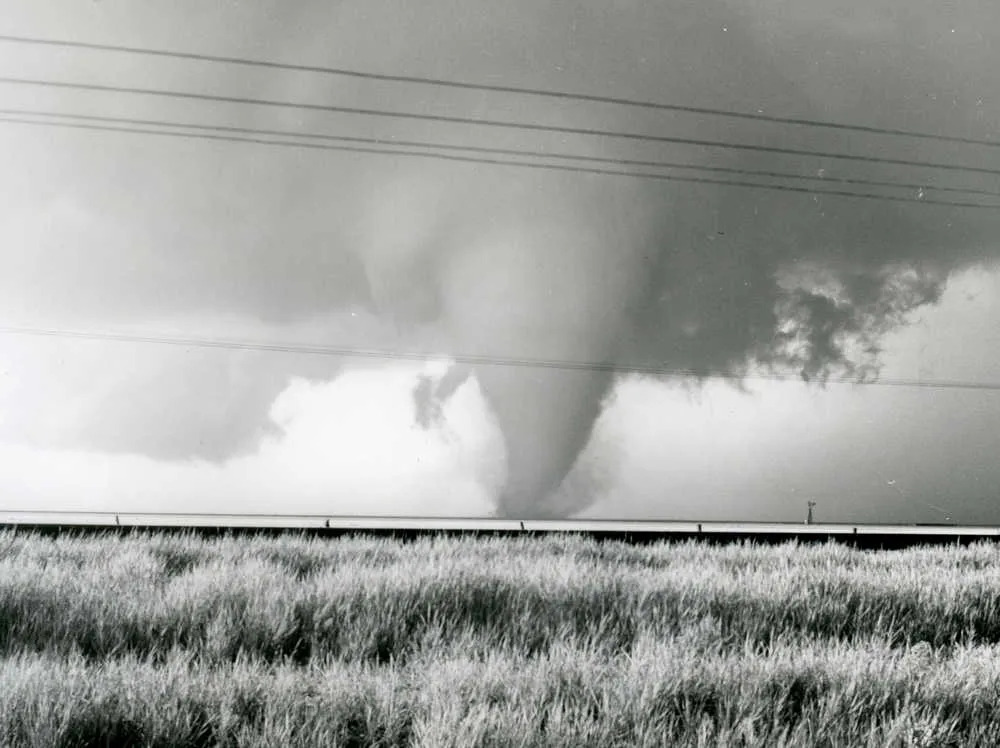
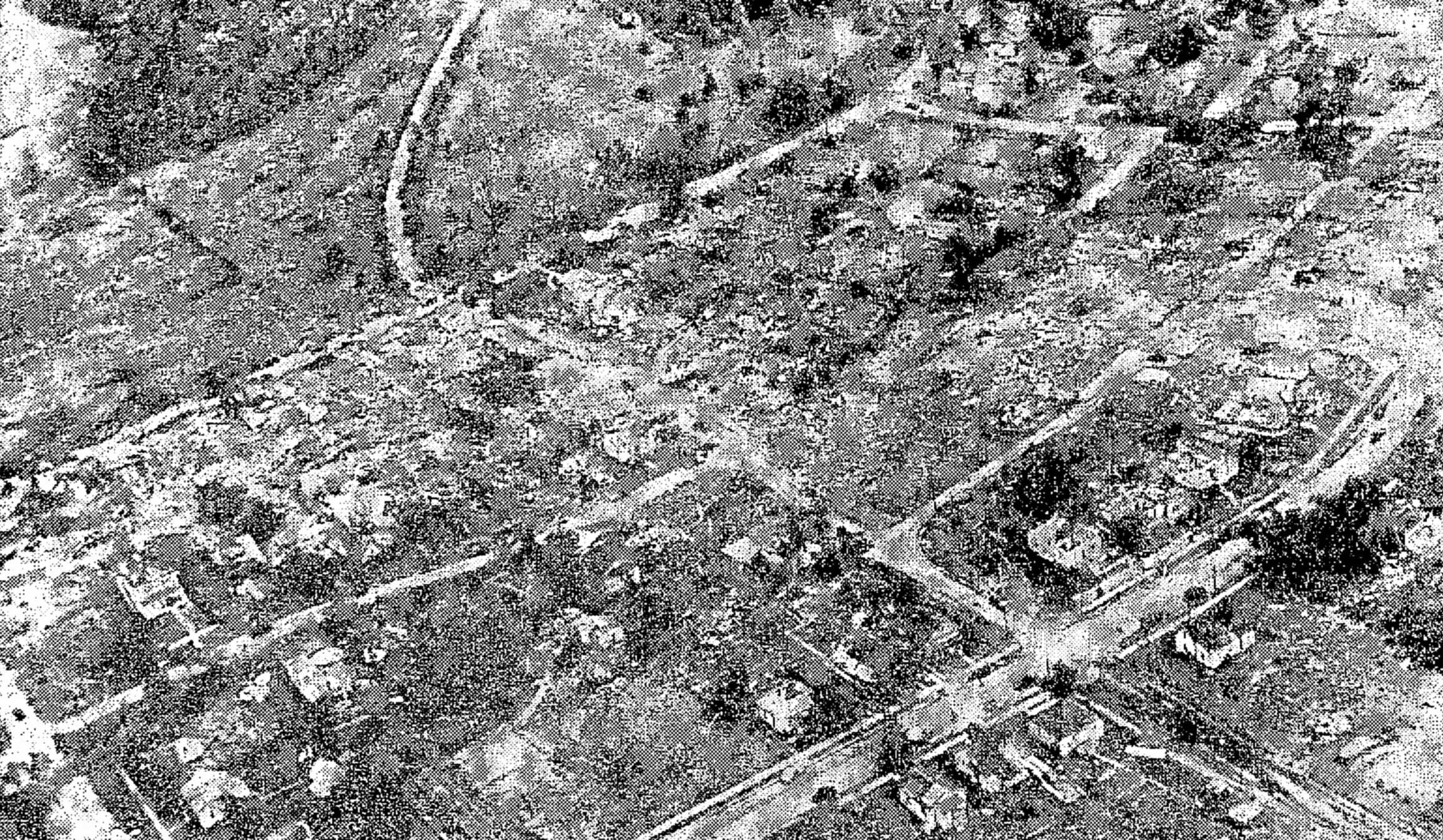
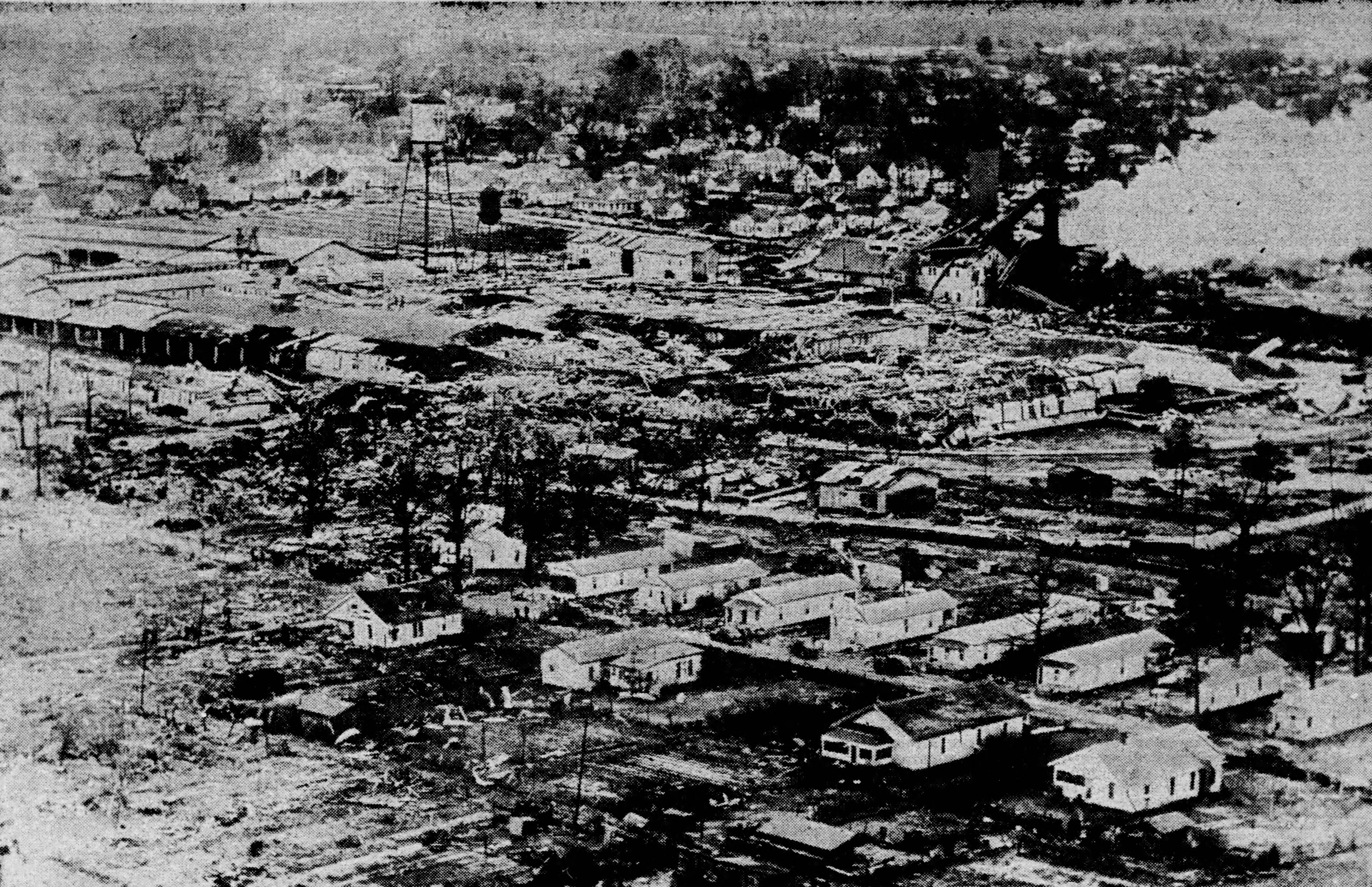
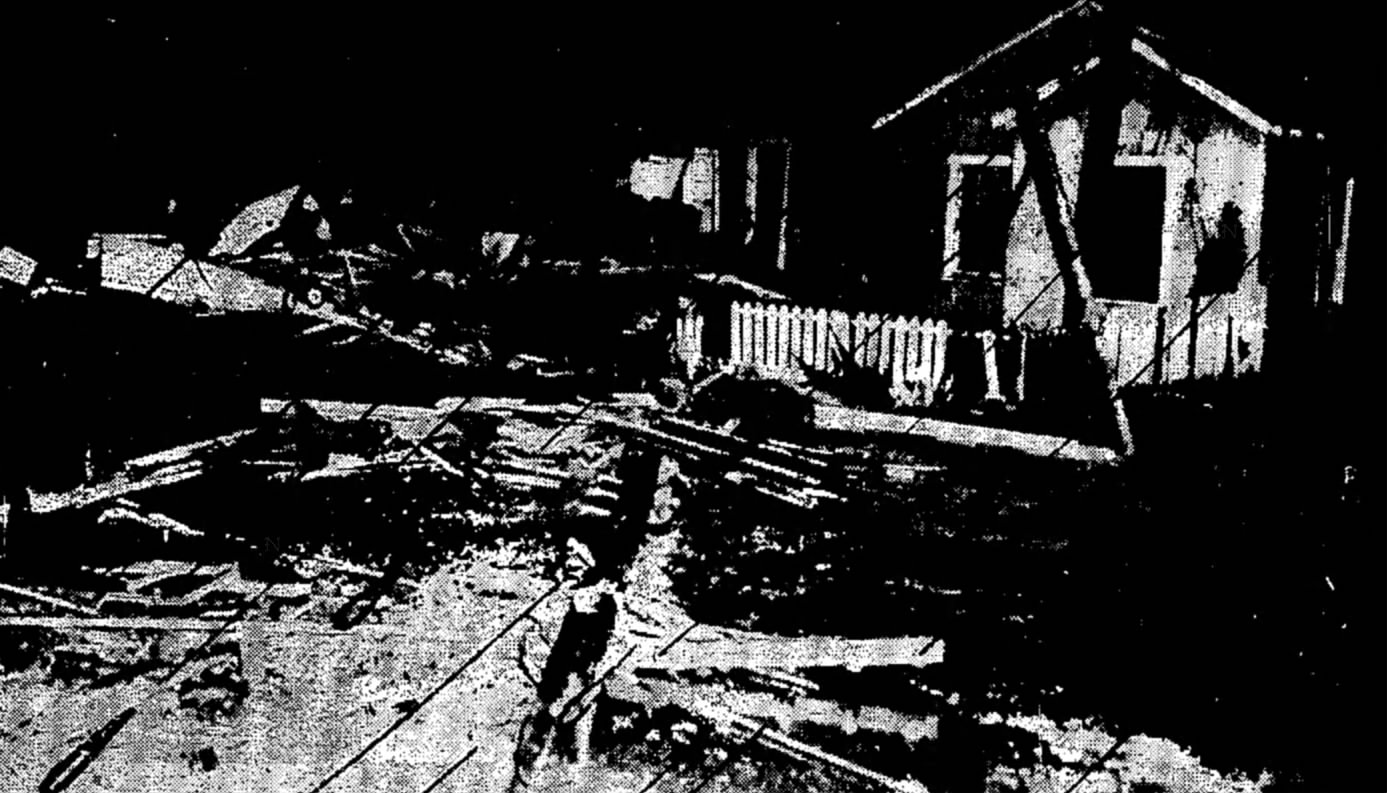
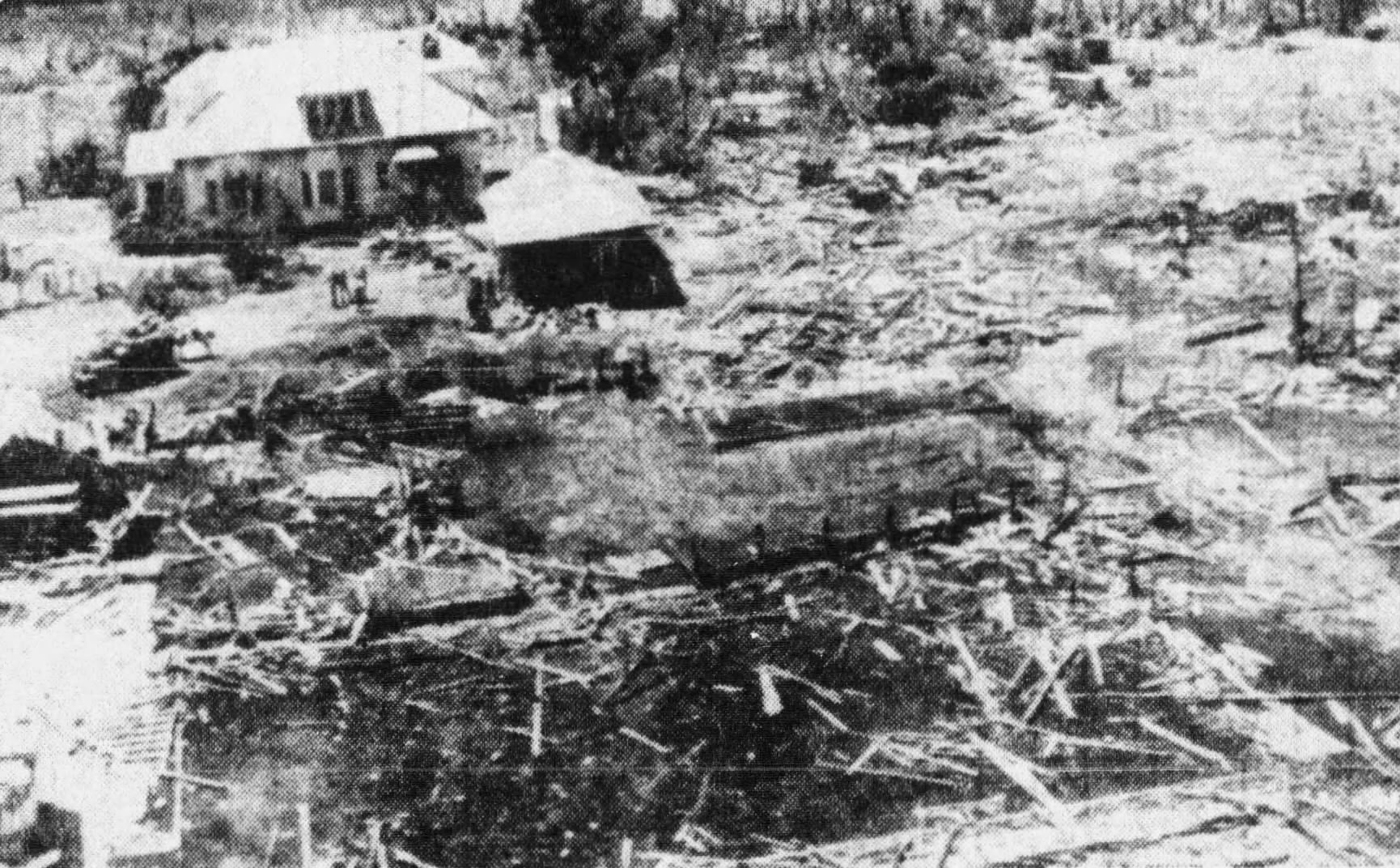
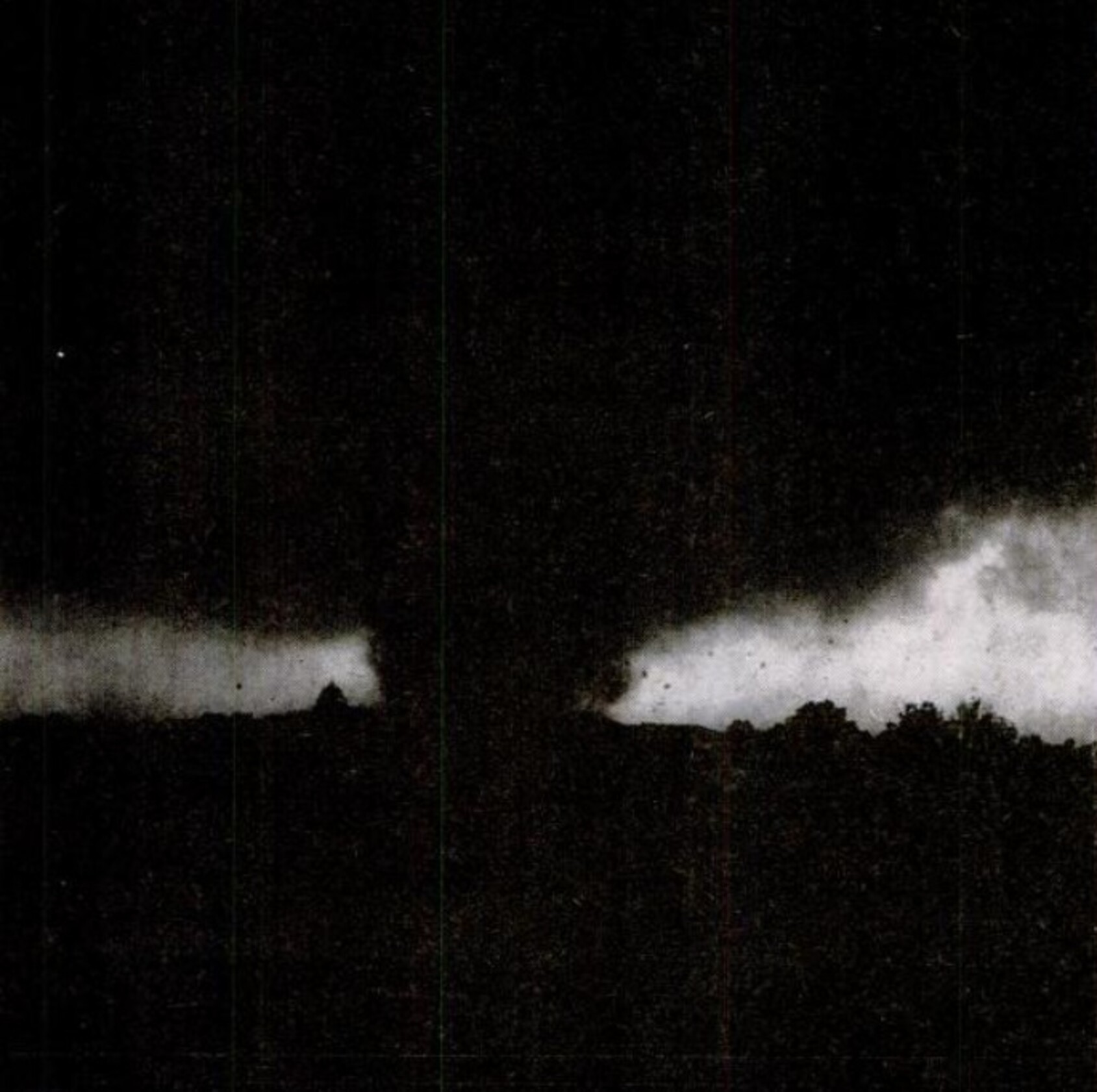
- Clockwise from top: A large F3 tornado over the Texas Panhandle on May 13; Warren, Arkansas following a deadly tornado on January 3; Damage to a farm near Fairfax, Missouri after a tornado on June 1; A large F4 tornado near Cape Girardeau, Missouri on May 21; Damage in Sundown, Texas following a tornado on May 6; An aerial view of Cape Girardeau, Missouri following a tornado on May 21.
- Timespan: January 1 — December 23
Maximum rated tornado
F4 tornado
- List
  – El Dorado-Warren, Arkansas
  on January 3
  – Desdemona, Texas
  on March 25
  – England, Arkansas
  on March 26
  – Canton, Oklahoma
  on March 30
  – Norman, Oklahoma
  on April 30
  – Sundown, Texas
  on May 6
  – Amarillo, Texas
  on May 15
  – Stratford, Texas
  on May 15
  – Spur, Texas
  on May 17
  – Solomon, Kansas
  on May 20
  – Greenfield, Oklahoma
  on May 21
  – Shelburn, Indiana
  on May 21
  – Wood River, Illinois
  on May 21
  – Palestine, Illinois-Merom, Indiana
  on May 21
  – Cape Girardeau, Missouri
  on May 21
  – York, Missouri
  on June 1
  – Essex, Iowa
  on June 1
  – Fairview-Oneonta, Alabama
  on November 24
  – Poplar Bluff, Missouri
  on December 11
- Tornadoes in U.S.: ≥279 (Note: Totals are from Grazulis, who only lists F2 and stronger tornadoes and F1/F0 tornadoes with fatalities.)
- Damage (U.S.): Unknown
- Fatalities (U.S.): ≥217
- Fatalities (worldwide): >217

This page documents the tornadoes and tornado outbreaks of 1949, primarily in the United States. Most recorded tornadoes form in the U.S., although some events may take place internationally. Tornado statistics for older years like this often appear significantly lower than modern years due to fewer reports or confirmed tornadoes.

This was the final year when tornadoes were not officially surveyed by the U.S. Weather Bureau, which would later become the National Weather Service, as well as the final year where tornadoes had no official rating. All documented significant tornadoes prior to 1950 were given unofficial ratings by tornado experts like Thomas P. Grazulis, which this article uses for the ratings below. Most of these records are limited to significant tornadoes; those rated F2 or higher on the Fujita scale, or which caused a fatality. There are also no official tornado counts for each month, so not every month is included in this article. In subsequent years, the documentation of tornadoes became much more widespread and efficient, with the average annual tornado count being around 1,253. Outside the United States, various meteorological organizations, like the European Severe Storms Laboratory rated tornadoes, which are considered official ratings.

== Events ==
Fatal United States tornadoes in 1949
- Approximate touchdown location of killer tornadoes in 1949 Summary of tornadoes: January 3 – Louisiana (1 death); January 3 – Arkansas (2 deaths); January 3 – Arkansas (1 death); January 3 – Arkansas (55 deaths); January 3 – Louisiana (1 death); January 18 – Mississippi (3 deaths); March 21 – Mississippi (1 death); March 24 – Louisiana, Mississippi (7 deaths); March 25 – Oklahoma (2 deaths); March 26 – Arkansas (1 death); March 26 – Arkansas (18 deaths); March 26 – Arkansas (5 deaths); March 26 – Mississippi (2 deaths); March 30 – Oklahoma (4 deaths); April 12 – Georgia (1 death); April 12 – Georgia (1 death); April 12 – Georgia (2 deaths); April 30 – Oklahoma (3 deaths); April 30 – Oklahoma (1 death); April 30 – Texas (3 deaths); April 30 – Oklahoma (1 death); May 1 – Louisiana (1 death); May 6 – Texas (2 deaths); May 15 – Texas (7 deaths); May 15 – Texas, Oklahoma (1 death); May 17 – Texas (1 death); May 19 – Missouri (1 death); May 20 – Oklahoma (1 death); May 20 – Oklahoma (1 death); May 20 – Oklahoma (1 death); May 20 – Kansas (1 death); May 21 – Oklahoma (1 death); May 21 – Missouri (1 death); May 21 – Indiana (3 deaths); May 21 – Indiana (14 deaths); May 21 – Missouri, Illinois (5 deaths); May 21 – Illinois, Indiana (4 deaths); May 21 – Missouri (1 death); May 21 – Missouri (23 deaths); June 1 – Missouri (1 death); June 8 – Nebraska (3 deaths); September 12 – Kansas, Missouri (1 death); October 9 – Nebraska (1 death); October 9 – Kansas (1 death); October 21 – Texas (1 death); November 24 – Alabama (4 deaths); November 24 – Alabama (10 deaths); November 24 – Alabama (1 death); December 11 – Arkansas (4 deaths); December 11 – Missouri (6 deaths); Total fatalities: ≥217

=== United States yearly total ===
Confirmed tornadoes by Fujita rating
FU	F0	F1	F2	F3	F4	F5	Total
≥71	?	≥2?	≥135	≥52	≥19	≥0	≥279

== January ==
=== January 1 (Denmark) ===
An F2 tornado struck Varde Municipality, Denmark, destroying the straw roof of a county estate and farm machinery was damaged. The exact location of this tornado is unknown.

=== January 3 ===
FU	F0	F1	F2	F3	F4	F5
0	?	?	6	5	1	0

An outbreak produced at least 12 significant tornadoes across Kansas, Louisiana, and Arkansas. One particularly devastating tornado, which was estimated to be at F4 intensity, obliterated Warren, Arkansas, killing 55 people. It is tied with the Fort Smith tornado from 1898 as the deadliest in Arkansas history. A total of 60 people were killed from the outbreak.

=== January 10 (Finland) ===
FU	F0	F1	F2	F3	F4	F5
0	0	2	1	0	0	0

Three waterspouts came ashore in Finland, which included an F2 tornado that struck Joutsa, Finland. The three waterspouts received their ratings from the European Severe Storms Laboratory and Finnish Meteorological Institute.

== February ==
=== February 2 ===
An estimated F2 tornado destroyed two farm houses southwest of Red Level, Alabama with five injuries in one of the homes. Livestock was killed on both farms as well.

== March ==
=== March 25–26 ===
FU	F0	F1	F2	F3	F4	F5
0	?	?	9	4	2	0

On March 25, an estimated F4 tornado touched down northeast of Gorman in Eastland County, Texas and moved northeastward, destroying 15 of the 23 homes on the northwest side of Desdemona, Texas. In all, 16 homes were destroyed and a few farm buildings were hit by the tornado. An F2 tornado touched down in the same county 12 hours later, destroying a switching station. Tornadic activity continued overnight as an estimated F3 tornado struck Crowder, Oklahoma, damaging or destroying 58 homes and businesses and killing two people. A second round of tornadoes struck the Southeast on the afternoon of March 26. The greatest losses were from an estimated F4 tornado that killed 18 people and injured 150 on a path from north of Sheridan to west of Hazen, Arkansas. The worst damage was near England, Arkansas, where 13 people died and 100 homes were damaged or destroyed. An estimated F3 tornado killed five people and injured 30 as it passed through rural areas near Wiville, McCrory, and Balch, Arkansas.

=== March 30 ===
FU	F0	F1	F2	F3	F4	F5
0	?	?	2	2	1	0

Four early morning tornadoes caused major damage and casualties in Oklahoma and Kansas. First, a destructive F4 tornado struck Canton, Oklahoma killing four people, injuring 31 and causing $250,000 in damage in the town. The same tornado tore apart many farms in rural areas and killed a boy while he slept in his home east of Longdale. After the tornado lifted, another tornado, estimated at F3 intensity, touched down and caused mostly minor damage as it moved northeastward before intensifying and slamming the town of Blackwell. 100 homes were damaged, 13 more were destroyed, an elementary school was completely leveled, and seven people were injured. Northwest of this tornado, an F2 tornado touched down and moved through Grant County, destroying six farms and obliterating a school. Another F3 tornado from the original storm touched down in Cowley County, Kansas, hitting five farms and destroying one home. Overall, the outbreak killed four and injured at least 31. That afternoon, an F2 tornado moved through Kemper, Illinois and passed west of Chesterfield, causing roof damage to five buildings in town. Buildings were destroyed on five farms.

== April ==
=== April 18 ===
An F2 tornado struck Washoe County in Nevada. The tornado damaged a Barn and a ranch.

=== April 30–May 1 ===
FU	F0	F1	F2	F3	F4	F5	Total
6	?	?	≥ 8	9	1	0	≥ 24*

An outbreak of at least 24 estimated significant tornadoes mostly struck Texas and Oklahoma. An estimated F3 tornado touched down east of Stella, Oklahoma and moved northeast to just east of Meeker, killing three. Another estimated F3 tornado touched down west of Oberlin and tore a nearly 30 mi (48 km) path to just east of Antlers, killing one. Across the border in Texas, an estimated F3 tornado touched down west of Hudsonville and was on the ground for 10.3 mi (16.6 km) as it moved northeast, passing north of Dotson, killing three. An estimated F4 tornado also moved through Norman, Oklahoma, injuring 48. An estimated F2 tornado killed one person west of Sawyer. The outbreak resulted in eight fatalities and at least 86 injuries.

== May ==
=== May 6 ===
FU	F0	F1	F2	F3	F4	F5
0	?	?	0	1	1	0

Two tornadoes caused major damage in New Mexico and Texas. An estimated F3 tornado touched down in New Mexico and moved into Texas, leveling two homes near Bledsoe, Texas. An estimated F4 tornado caused major damage in Sundown, Texas. Fourteen homes were badly damaged with two being swept away and a car and a truck were thrown considerable distances. A church and parsonage were also leveled, causing two fatalities.

=== May 13 ===
FU	F0	F1	F2	F3	F4	F5
0	?	?	1	2	0	0

Two estimated F3 tornadoes touched down in Carson County, Texas northeast of Amarillo, destroying farms, farmhouses, and cars. An estimated F2 tornado also destroyed a home in Potter County, Texas.

=== May 15 ===
FU	F0	F1	F2	F3	F4	F5
0	?	?	3	0	2	0

Several strong tornadoes struck the Oklahoma and Texas Panhandles. An estimated F4 tornado hit Amarillo, killing seven people and injuring 82. This tornado remains Amarillo's strongest and costliest tornado. Another estimated F4 tornado injured three people near Stratford after which it crossed into Oklahoma and killed an elderly man near Goodwell. Witnesses described the tornado as sounding like a "low-flying B-29".

=== May 17 ===
FU	F0	F1	F2	F3	F4	F5
0	?	?	4	3	1	0

Tornadoes touched down in Texas, Oklahoma, and Nebraska, damaging or destroying numerous structures. One estimated F4 tornado killed one person near Spur, Texas.

=== May 20–21 ===
FU	F0	F1	F2	F3	F4	F5
33	?	?	6	3	4	0

A deadly outbreak struck several states. The most notable event was a violent tornado that struck Palestine, Illinois, on May 21. A restaurant was leveled, and cars in the parking lot were thrown up to 300 yd (900 ft) away from where they originated. The tornado was rated F4 by Grazulis, although some experts rated the tornado F5. A total of 56 people were killed by this outbreak.

== June ==
=== June 17 ===
FU	F0	F1	F2	F3	F4	F5
0	?	?	1	1	0	0

Two tornadoes, an estimated F2 and an estimated F3, caused major damage to farm buildings and barns in Northeastern Colorado.

== August ==
=== August 30 ===
An estimated F2 tornado tore the roof and ceilings off of a home in Montgomery, Alabama.

== October ==
=== October 9–10 ===
FU	F0	F1	F2	F3	F4	F5
0	?	≥1	9	1	0	0

A major tornado outbreak struck Oklahoma, Kansas, and Nebraska. An estimated F2 tornado touched down on the north side of Lincoln, Nebraska, destroying barns, killing one person, and injuring three others. An estimated F1 tornado killed one person in Russell, Kansas. An estimated F3 tornado hit Slapout, Oklahoma and moved past Rosston, damaging numerous farms and injuring three people.

=== October 24 (Sweden) ===
A "violent tornado" struck Skogstorp, Eskilstuna Municipality in Sweden along a 3 kilometres (1.9 mi) path. The tornado "threw large trees hundreds of meters". One structure had "the basement roof became a single pile of brick pans." The European Severe Storms Laboratory rated the tornado F2.

== November ==
=== November 24 ===
FU	F0	F1	F2	F3	F4	F5
0	?	?	2	0	1	0

Three deadly tornadoes struck Alabama. An estimated F4 tornado tore through Fairview, Oneonta and Taits Gap, damaging or destroying 32 homes and 84 other structures. Approximately 100 head of cattle were killed and several of the homes were completely blown away. It caused 44 injuries and four fatalities with three of the fatalities occurring in an Easley home while the other took place in an Oneonta home. At the same time as this tornado, an estimated F2 tornado traveled from Hackneyville to Northeastern Alexander City. It picked up one house and tossed it 150 yards (140 m) into another house, where it was demolished. All 10 occupants, a woman and nine children, in the first house were killed while 10 more people in the other house were injured. Another estimated F2 tornado struck Sand Mountain, South Henagar, and North Mentone, although the damage path indicated that it only touched down on ridge tops. Three homes were destroyed, seven others were damaged, one person was killed and 20 others were injured. Overall, the tornadoes killed 15 people and injured 74 more.

== December ==
=== December 11 ===
FU	F0	F1	F2	F3	F4	F5
0	?	?	4	1	1	0

Multiple tornadoes touched down in Oklahoma, Missouri, Arkansas, and Illinois. An estimated F4 tornado caused major damage in rural areas near Poplar Bluff and Hillard, Missouri, killing six people and injuring 30. An estimated F3 tornado, described as a "skipping column of smoke," hit Providence, Arkansas and moved past Bradford, Arkansas, killing four people and injuring 11.

=== December 23 ===
A waterspout came ashore on Long Beach becoming a F2 tornado. The tornado damaged two buildings.

== See also ==
- Tornado
  - Tornadoes by year
  - Tornado records
  - Tornado climatology
  - Tornado myths
- List of tornado outbreaks
  - List of F5 and EF5 tornadoes
  - List of North American tornadoes and tornado outbreaks
  - List of 21st-century Canadian tornadoes and tornado outbreaks
  - List of European tornadoes and tornado outbreaks
  - List of tornadoes and tornado outbreaks in Asia
  - List of Southern Hemisphere tornadoes and tornado outbreaks
  - List of tornadoes striking downtown areas
  - List of tornadoes with confirmed satellite tornadoes
- Tornado intensity
  - Fujita scale
  - Enhanced Fujita scale
