= Tornado outbreak of April 30 – May 1, 1949 =

Severe weather event in the United States

Tornado outbreak
- Tornadoes: ≥ 24
- Max. rating: F4 tornado
- Duration: April 30 – May 1, 1949

Overall effects
- Fatalities: 10
- Injuries: 103
- Damage: $1,338,500 ($18,110,000 in 2025 USD) (Note: All losses are in 1949 USD unless otherwise noted.)
- Areas affected: Central and Southern United States
- Part of the tornadoes and tornado outbreaks of 1949

From April 30 to May 1, 1949, a tornado outbreak swept eastward across the United States, beginning over the Great Plains. The severe weather event claimed 10 lives and inflicted over 100 injuries. It produced several deadly tornadoes, mostly in Oklahoma, including a pair that killed three each on April 30. The most intense tornado of the outbreak, retroactively rated a violent F4, tracked across parts of the Oklahoma City metropolitan area that day. A deadly F3 the following day claimed a life in Louisiana as well. This outbreak alone set an official monthly record of tornadoes to date in Oklahoma. (Note: An outbreak is generally defined as a group of at least six tornadoes (the number sometimes varies slightly according to local climatology) with no more than a six-hour gap between individual tornadoes. An outbreak sequence, prior to (after) the start of modern records in 1950, is defined as a period of no more than two (one) consecutive days without at least one significant (F2 or stronger) tornado.)

== Outbreak statistics ==
Daily statistics of tornadoes during the tornado outbreak of April 30 – May 1, 1949
Date (Note: All dates are based on the local time zone where the tornado touched down; however, all times are in Coordinated Universal Time and dates are split at midnight CST/CDT for consistency.)	Total	F-scale rating (Note: The Fujita scale was devised under the aegis of scientist T. Theodore Fujita in the early 1970s. Prior to the advent of the scale in 1971, tornadoes in the United States were officially unrated. Tornado ratings were retroactively applied to events prior to the formal adoption of the F-scale by the National Weather Service. While the Fujita scale has been superseded by the Enhanced Fujita scale in the U.S. since February 1, 2007, Canada used the old scale until April 1, 2013; nations elsewhere, like the United Kingdom, apply other classifications such as the TORRO scale.)							Deaths	Injuries	Damage (Note: The National Oceanic and Atmospheric Administration's Storm Data publication does not list exact damage totals for every event, instead giving damage categories. As such, damage for individual tornadoes is not comprehensive.)
Date	Total	FU	F0	F1	F2	F3	F4	F5	Deaths	Injuries	Damage
April 30	18	3	?	?	6	8	1	0	9	86	$1,113,500
May 1	6	3	?	?	2	1	0	0	1	17	$225,000
Total	24	6	?	?	8	9	1	0	10	103	$1,338,500

== Confirmed tornadoes ==
Confirmed tornadoes by Fujita rating
FU	F0	F1	F2	F3	F4	F5	Total
6	?	?	≥ 8	9	1	0	≥ 24*

- A possible F2 tornado "almost certainly" hit Nelson in northwestern Choctaw County, Oklahoma, on April 30.

Prior to 1990, there is a likely undercount of tornadoes, particularly E/F0–1, with reports of weaker tornadoes becoming more common as population increased. A sharp increase in the annual average E/F0–1 count by approximately 200 tornadoes was noted upon the implementation of NEXRAD Doppler weather radar in 1990–1991. (Note: Historically, the number of tornadoes globally and in the United States was and is likely underrepresented: research by Grazulis on annual tornado activity suggests that, as of 2001, only 53% of yearly U.S. tornadoes were officially recorded. Documentation of tornadoes outside the United States was historically less exhaustive, owing to the lack of monitors in many nations and, in some cases, to internal political controls on public information. Most countries only recorded tornadoes that produced severe damage or loss of life. Significant low biases in U.S. tornado counts likely occurred through the early 1990s, when advanced NEXRAD was first installed and the National Weather Service began comprehensively verifying tornado occurrences.) 1974 marked the first year where significant tornado (E/F2+) counts became homogenous with contemporary values, attributed to the consistent implementation of Fujita scale assessments. Numerous discrepancies on the details of tornadoes in this outbreak exist between sources. The total count of tornadoes and ratings differs from various agencies accordingly. The list below documents information from the most contemporary official sources alongside assessments from tornado historian Thomas P. Grazulis.

=== April 30 event ===
Confirmed tornadoes — Saturday, April 30, 1949
F#	Location	County / Parish	State	Time (UTC)	Path length	Width (Note: The listed width values are primarily the average/mean width of the tornadoes, with those having known maximum widths denoted by ♯. From 1952 to 1994, reports largely list mean width whereas contemporary years list maximum width. Values provided by Grazulis are the average width, with estimates being rounded down (i.e. 0.5 mi (0.80 km) is rounded down from 880 yards to 800 yards.)	Damage
FU	N of Lakin to NE of Garden City	Kearny, Finney	Kansas	20:00–20:30	Unknown	Unknown	$10,000
FU	Possibly a tornado family, this event consisted of many funnel clouds, damaging "rural property". Four remote spots north of Garden City were hit.						
F2	S to E of Eldorado	Jackson	Oklahoma	20:45–?	8 mi (13 km)	50 yd (46 m)	$1,000
F2	This strong tornado unroofed a pair of homes, strewing debris up to 1/2 mi (0.80 km). One of the homes, seven rooms in all, lost its front and shifted on its foundation. A third home, then unoccupied, was wrecked as well.						
F4	Lindsay Ridge to Norman to W of Stella	McClain, Cleveland	Oklahoma	20:57–?	22 mi (35 km)	400 yd (370 m)	$800,000
F4	This violent tornado, the first member of a long-lived family, struck the onetime site of the National Severe Storms Laboratory (NSSL), the University of Oklahoma (OU) north campus. Scattered damage began just south of Blanchard. Well-built structures were leveled, and nine farmhouses were wrecked. Of the 48 injured were several military personnel, nine of whom were badly wounded. Near Norman the tornado damaged 10 airplanes, a dozen vehicles, and 31 buildings. Damage at OU alone totaled $600,000. The path ended near the F4–F5 Moore tornadoes in 2010 and 2013.						
F3	S of Lawton to S of Agawam	Comanche, Grady	Oklahoma	21:00–?	35 mi (56 km)	200 yd (180 m)	$20,000
F3	Part of a family, this intense tornado wrecked five farmhouses and a school in the Marlow–Richland area. A trio of other homes were destroyed as well. A few semi-trailer trucks were tipped onto their sides. A pickup truck and an automobile were tossed off a road, injuring a pair of men. In all, four injuries occurred.						
FU	Oakley	Logan	Kansas	21:30–?	Unknown	Unknown	$2,500
FU	An incomplete Veterans of Foreign Wars hall was destroyed, and a flower shop was shorn of its roof. A garage and trailer were tipped onto their sides as well. Trees in town were shredded.						
F3	W to N of Frederick	Tillman	Oklahoma	22:00–?	6 mi (9.7 km)	Unknown	Unknown
F3	This was one of six funnel clouds sighted in the area this afternoon. A well-built farmhouse incurred "near-F4" damage.						
F2	Burt	Tillman	Oklahoma	22:00–?	Unknown	Unknown	Unknown
F2	This tornado wrecked a barn and a porch. A home lost part of its roof as well. An injury occurred.						
F3	Near Antioch to NE of Wayne	Garvin, McClain	Oklahoma	22:30–?	17 mi (27 km)	150 yd (140 m)	$39,000
F3	This intense tornado passed just east of Maysville, flattening barns and half a dozen farmhouses. Seven other farmhouses were damaged, and another home was wrecked near Wayne. Trucks were flipped as well. One person was injured.						
F2	Econtuchka	Seminole, Pottawatomie	Oklahoma	22:45–?	8 mi (13 km)	200 yd (180 m)	$10,000
F2	Eight homes were destroyed or damaged.						
F3	E of Stella to E of Meeker	Cleveland, Pottawatomie, Lincoln	Oklahoma	22:50–?	20 mi (32 km)	250 yd (230 m)	$200,000
F3	3 deaths – Related to the Norman F4, this tornado destroyed 11 homes near Shawnee Lake, resulting in a fatality. The other deaths occurred near Meeker, where the tornado wrecked farmhouses and oil derricks. The Crescent School lost its roof, allowing rain to damage its interior. Damage also affected Payson. The tornado moved a car 400 yd (1,200 ft) and its occupants 200 yd (600 ft). Eight injuries occurred.						
F2	E of Comanche to E of Duncan	Stephens	Oklahoma	23:20–?	10 mi (16 km)	300 yd (270 m)	$6,000
F2	Barns were wrecked.						
F3	W of Liberty to SE of Utica to near Bennington	Bryan, Choctaw	Oklahoma	23:30–?	35 mi (56 km)	600 yd (550 m)	$25,000
F3	1 death – This tornado family destroyed many homes. Seven injuries occurred.						
F3	S of Boswell to W of Soper	Choctaw, Pushmataha	Oklahoma	00:00–?	30 mi (48 km)	400 yd (370 m)	Unknown
F3	1 death – Another intense family, paralleling the previous, destroyed 11 or more homes, along with many barns. Eight injuries occurred.						
F3	E of Davidson	Tillman	Oklahoma	00:00–?	Unknown	Unknown	Unknown
F3	A few small homes were obliterated, and many barns were wrecked.						
F2	SW to W of Bonham	Fannin	Texas	00:00–?	4 mi (6.4 km)	70 yd (64 m)	Unknown
F2	10 homes were badly damaged or unroofed. Seven injuries occurred.						
FU	SE of Jetmore	Hodgeman	Kansas	00:00–?	5 mi (8.0 km)	880 yd (800 m)	Unknown
FU	This tornado hit a trio of farmsteads, wrecking a barn, three steel granaries, and chicken coops. A pair of elm trees were downed as well.						
F3	NE of Bonham to N of Lamasco to NE of Telephone	Fannin	Texas	01:05–?	8 mi (13 km)	100 yd (91 m)	Unknown
F3	3 deaths – Four homes were destroyed and a family killed. A few people were injured. Losses from this and the preceding F2 event totaled $75,000.						
F2	NE of Schooler Lake	Choctaw	Oklahoma	02:00–?	10 mi (16 km)	Unknown	Unknown
F2	1 death – This tornado only wrecked a single home.						

=== May 1 event ===
Confirmed tornadoes — Sunday, May 1, 1949
F#	Location	County / Parish	State	Time (UTC)	Path length	Width	Damage
F2	WNW of Houston to Okolona	Chickasaw	Mississippi	14:50–?	20 mi (32 km)	Unknown	$25,000
F2	This tornado hit northwestern Houston, tearing off roofs there. It then destroyed homes at Okolona. Only rural areas were hit. Five injuries occurred.						
FU	Dickson	Dickson	Tennessee	17:45–?	Unknown	400 yd (370 m)	Unknown
FU	"Tornadic winds" damaged about 50 homes. Windows were smashed and roofing damaged. A building at a factory was hit, and many gardens were "ruined". This event may have been a downburst, as the "storm" lasted five minutes.						
F2	W of Pulaski	Giles	Tennessee	17:55–?	0.5 mi (0.80 km)	50 yd (46 m)	$75,000
F2	This tornado wrecked a grain elevator and unroofed a pair of other structures. Machinery was damaged as well.						
FU	Mount Pleasant	Maury	Tennessee	18:00–?	~12 mi (19 km)	500 yd (460 m)	Unknown
FU	Winds reached an estimated 75 mph (121 km/h). Fallen trees and limbs damaged about 15 structures in town. This event may have been a downburst, as the "storm" lasted 10 minutes.						
F3	S of Homer	Claiborne	Louisiana	23:00–?	Unknown	Unknown	$25,000
F3	1 death – This intense tornado wrecked four barns and five homes. A dozen injuries occurred.						
FU	Water Valley	Yalobusha	Mississippi	Unknown	Unknown	Unknown	$100,000
FU	Detailed information is unavailable.						

== Sources ==
- Agee, Ernest M.; Childs, Samuel (June 1, 2014). "Adjustments in Tornado Counts, F-Scale Intensity, and Path Width for Assessing Significant Tornado Destruction". Journal of Applied Meteorology and Climatology. 53 (6). American Meteorological Society: 1494–1505. Bibcode:2014JApMC..53.1494A. doi:10.1175/JAMC-D-13-0235.1.
- Brooks, Harold E. (April 2004). "On the Relationship of Tornado Path Length and Width to Intensity". Weather and Forecasting. 19 (2): 310–19. Bibcode:2004WtFor..19..310B. doi:10.1175/1520-0434(2004)019<0310:OTROTP>2.0.CO;2.
- Cook, A. R.; Schaefer, J. T. (August 2008). "The Relation of El Niño–Southern Oscillation (ENSO) to Winter Tornado Outbreaks". Monthly Weather Review. 136 (8): 3121–3137. Bibcode:2008MWRv..136.3121C. doi:10.1175/2007MWR2171.1.
- Edwards, Roger; LaDue, James G.; Ferree, John T.; Scharfenberg, Kevin; Maier, Chris; Coulbourne, William L. (May 1, 2013). "Tornado Intensity Estimation: Past, Present, and Future". Bulletin of the American Meteorological Society. 94 (5). American Meteorological Society: 641–653. Bibcode:2013BAMS...94..641E. doi:10.1175/BAMS-D-11-00006.1.
- Grazulis, Thomas P. (May 1984). Violent Tornado Climatography, 1880–1982. OSTI (Technical report). NUREG. Washington, D.C.: Nuclear Regulatory Commission. OSTI 7099491. CR-3670.
  - — (November 1990). Significant Tornadoes 1880–1989. Vol. 2. St. Johnsbury, Vermont: The Tornado Project of Environmental Films. ISBN 1-879362-02-3.
  - — (July 1993). Significant Tornadoes 1680–1991: A Chronology and Analysis of Events. St. Johnsbury, Vermont: The Tornado Project of Environmental Films. ISBN 1-879362-03-1.
  - — (2001a). The Tornado: Nature's Ultimate Windstorm. Norman: University of Oklahoma Press. ISBN 978-0-8061-3538-0.
  - — (2001b). F5-F6 Tornadoes. St. Johnsbury, Vermont: The Tornado Project of Environmental Films.
- Maughan, W. E., ed. (April 1949). Written at Oklahoma City. "Tornadoes, April 30, 1949". Oklahoma section. Climatological Data. 58 (4). Washington, D.C.: United States Weather Bureau: 54.
- "Severe Local Storms for April 1949". Monthly Weather Review. 77 (4). Washington, D.C.: United States Weather Bureau: 128–30. April 1949. doi:10.1175/1520-0493(1949)077<0128:SSFA>2.0.CO;2 – via American Meteorological Society.
- "Severe Local Storms for May 1949". Monthly Weather Review. 77 (5). Washington, D.C.: United States Weather Bureau: 156–64. May 1949. doi:10.1175/1520-0493(1949)077<0156:SSFM>2.0.CO;2 – via American Meteorological Society.
