= Tornado outbreak of January 3, 1949 =

Weather event in the United States

Tornado outbreak
- Tornadoes: ≥14
- Max. rating: F4 tornado
- Duration: January 3, 1949

Overall effects
- Fatalities: 60+
- Injuries: 504
- Damage: $1,576,500 ($21,330,000 in 2025 USD) (Note: All losses are in 1949 USD unless otherwise noted.)
- Areas affected: Kansas, Louisiana, Arkansas
- Part of the tornadoes and tornado outbreaks of 1949

A deadly tornado outbreak produced at least 14 destructive tornadoes across Kansas, Louisiana, and Arkansas on Monday, January 3, 1949. (Note: An outbreak is generally defined as a group of at least six tornadoes (the number sometimes varies slightly according to local climatology) with no more than a six-hour gap between individual tornadoes. An outbreak sequence, prior to (after) the start of modern records in 1950, is defined as a period of no more than two (one) consecutive days without at least one significant (F2 or stronger) tornado.) The worst of the outbreak was a deadly, devastating and violent (estimated) F4 tornado that tore though Warren, Arkansas. Part of a multi-state family, the tornado killed at least 55 people, a majority of the deaths in the outbreak, and is now tied with the Fort Smith tornado from 1898 as the deadliest in Arkansas history. In addition, a pair of deadly F3 tornadoes in Louisiana, along with a few other strong tornadoes in Arkansas, claimed five more lives. Overall, a total of 60 or more people were killed from the outbreak, and over 500 sustained injuries. The tornado outbreak would become the deadliest to occur during the month of January.

== Confirmed tornadoes ==
Confirmed tornadoes by Fujita rating
FU	F0	F1	F2	F3	F4	F5	Total
2	?	?	6	5	1	0	≥14

Prior to 1990, there is a likely undercount of tornadoes, particularly E/F0–1, with reports of weaker tornadoes becoming more common as population increased. A sharp increase in the annual average E/F0–1 count by approximately 200 tornadoes was noted upon the implementation of NEXRAD Doppler weather radar in 1990–1991. (Note: Historically, the number of tornadoes globally and in the United States was and is likely underrepresented: research by Grazulis on annual tornado activity suggests that, as of 2001, only 53% of yearly U.S. tornadoes were officially recorded. Documentation of tornadoes outside the United States was historically less exhaustive, owing to the lack of monitors in many nations and, in some cases, to internal political controls on public information. Most countries only recorded tornadoes that produced severe damage or loss of life. Significant low biases in U.S. tornado counts likely occurred through the early 1990s, when advanced NEXRAD was first installed and the National Weather Service began comprehensively verifying tornado occurrences.) 1974 marked the first year where significant tornado (E/F2+) counts became homogenous with contemporary values, attributed to the consistent implementation of Fujita scale assessments. (Note: The Fujita scale was devised under the aegis of scientist T. Theodore Fujita in the early 1970s. Prior to the advent of the scale in 1971, tornadoes in the United States were officially unrated. Tornado ratings were retroactively applied to events prior to the formal adoption of the F-scale by the National Weather Service. While the Fujita scale has been superseded by the Enhanced Fujita scale in the U.S. since February 1, 2007, Canada used the old scale until April 1, 2013; nations elsewhere, like the United Kingdom, apply other classifications such as the TORRO scale.) Numerous discrepancies on the details of tornadoes in this outbreak exist between sources. The total count of tornadoes and ratings differs from various agencies accordingly. The list below documents information from the most contemporary official sources alongside assessments from tornado historian Thomas P. Grazulis.

List of confirmed tornadoes in the tornado outbreak of January 3, 1949 (Note: All dates are based on the local time zone where the tornado touched down; however, all times are in Coordinated Universal Time and dates are split at midnight CST/CDT for consistency.)
F#	Location	County / Parish	State	Time (UTC)	Path length	Width (Note: The listed width values are primarily the average/mean width of the tornadoes, with those having known maximum widths denoted by ♯. From 1952 to 1994, reports largely list mean width whereas contemporary years list maximum width. Values provided by Grazulis are the average width, with estimates being rounded down (i.e. 0.5 mi (0.80 km) is rounded down from 880 yards to 800 yards.)	Damage
F3	NE of Altoona to Vilas to SW of Petrolia	Wilson, Neosho	Kansas	20:00–?	18 mi (29 km)	150 yd (140 m)	$120,000
F3	This intense tornado wrecked seven homes, half a dozen of them at Vilas, along with 20 or more barns and a 12-mile-long (19 km) stretch of power lines. One other building and 13 other homes incurred damage. One person was injured.						
F3	NE of Iola to E of Bush City	Allen, Anderson	Kansas	20:30–21:00	25 mi (40 km)	100 yd (91 m)	$45,000
F3	Another intense tornado flattened a trio of barns and a pair of homes, killing livestock as well. Numerous outbuildings received damage.						
F2	Near Dixie to N of Sarepta	Caddo, Bossier, Webster	Louisiana	20:45–?	25 mi (40 km)	100 yd (91 m)	Unknown
F2	This was the first member of a state-crossing tornado family that included the Warren F4. Some homes were wrecked near Sarepta, with 14 injuries resulting.						
FU	SW to NE of Richter	Franklin	Kansas	21:00–21:30	Unknown	200 yd (180 m)	$500
FU	This tornado left only scattered impacts. Barns and outbuildings were damaged.						
F3	Near Cotton Valley to Gordon	Webster, Claiborne	Louisiana	21:15–?	25 mi (40 km)	300 yd (270 m)	Unknown
F3	1 death – This tornado destroyed approximately 20 homes, passing close to the path of a deadly F4 that hit Cotton Valley on December 31, 1947, killing 18 people. South of Haynesville a bus idled to let the tornado pass by 200 yd (600 ft) ahead. Seven people were injured, all at Gordon, where the death occurred.						
F2	Near Bunn to Farindale to Grapevine	Dallas, Cleveland, Grant	Arkansas	22:00–?	18 mi (29 km)	150 yd (140 m)	$16,000
F2	1 death – This tornado touched down intermittently, wrecking barns and small homes, including four homes at Grapevine. Vehicles were damaged as well. Seven people were injured.						
F2	Near Bismarck to near Magnet	Hot Spring	Arkansas	22:00–?	20 mi (32 km)	200 yd (180 m)	Unknown
F2	Forests and homes were leveled. One person were injured.						
F3	Near Hopewell to N of El Dorado	Union	Arkansas	22:00–?	10 mi (16 km)	Unknown	Unknown
F3	2 deaths – At least a few homes were flattened, along with much timber. 18 people were injured.						
F4	E of El Dorado to Warren	Union, Calhoun, Bradley	Arkansas	22:15–?	40 mi (64 km)	1,320 yd (1,210 m)♯	$1,300,000
F4	55+ deaths – This event likely comprised two or three distinct tornadoes, but details are incomplete. Small homes and several hundred acres of trees were leveled near the start of the path. Strengthening, the tornado tracked into Warren with catastrophic result. Of the 120 homes destroyed, most were leveled—many without trace, as foundations were swept clean. 72 others incurred severe damage, 150 more minor losses. A bus was twisted around a tree, multi-ton steel debris carried 3/4 mi (1.2 km), weighty timbers driven 2 to 3 ft (0.67 to 1.00 yd) straight into the earth, and a 1-tonne (1,000 kg), steel I-beam bent. In all, 500 homes were damaged. All known fatalities occurred at Warren, mostly in the northeastern section. 435 people were injured. Small items from Warren were carried 70 mi (110 km).						
F2	Near Malvern	Hot Spring	Arkansas	22:20–?	5 mi (8.0 km)	100 yd (91 m)	Unknown
F2	Barns were shattered and homes unroofed.						
F2	Kentucky to Congo	Saline	Arkansas	22:30–?	5 mi (8.0 km)	100 yd (91 m)	Unknown
F2	Barns and small homes were torn apart. There were two injuries.						
F3	Near Choudrant to W of Downsville to E of Farmerville	Lincoln, Union	Louisiana	00:30–?	20 mi (32 km)	100 yd (91 m)	$95,000
F3	1 death – 19 homes were wrecked, along with 11 other structures. There were 14 injuries.						
F2	S of Gould	Lincoln, Desha	Arkansas	01:00–?	5 mi (8.0 km)	100 yd (91 m)	Unknown
F2	A bus was twisted around a tree, and a trio of homes were wrecked. There were five injuries.						
FU	Near Pinnacle Mountain	Pulaski	Arkansas	Unknown	Unknown	Unknown	Unknown
FU	This tornado hit a prison farm.						

== See also ==
- List of North American tornadoes and tornado outbreaks
  - List of F4, EF4, and IF4 tornadoes

== Sources ==
- Agee, Ernest M.; Childs, Samuel (June 1, 2014). "Adjustments in Tornado Counts, F-Scale Intensity, and Path Width for Assessing Significant Tornado Destruction". Journal of Applied Meteorology and Climatology. 53 (6). American Meteorological Society: 1494–1505. Bibcode:2014JApMC..53.1494A. doi:10.1175/JAMC-D-13-0235.1.
- Brooks, Harold E. (April 2004). "On the Relationship of Tornado Path Length and Width to Intensity". Weather and Forecasting. 19 (2): 310–19. Bibcode:2004WtFor..19..310B. doi:10.1175/1520-0434(2004)019<0310:OTROTP>2.0.CO;2.
- Cook, A. R.; Schaefer, J. T. (August 2008). "The Relation of El Niño–Southern Oscillation (ENSO) to Winter Tornado Outbreaks". Monthly Weather Review. 136 (8): 3121–3137. Bibcode:2008MWRv..136.3121C. doi:10.1175/2007MWR2171.1.
- Edwards, Roger; LaDue, James G.; Ferree, John T.; Scharfenberg, Kevin; Maier, Chris; Coulbourne, William L. (May 1, 2013). "Tornado Intensity Estimation: Past, Present, and Future". Bulletin of the American Meteorological Society. 94 (5). American Meteorological Society: 641–653. Bibcode:2013BAMS...94..641E. doi:10.1175/BAMS-D-11-00006.1.
- Grazulis, Thomas P. (May 1984). Violent Tornado Climatography, 1880–1982. OSTI (Technical report). NUREG. Washington, D.C.: Nuclear Regulatory Commission. OSTI 7099491. CR-3670.
  - — (November 1990). Significant Tornadoes 1880–1989. Vol. 2. St. Johnsbury, Vermont: The Tornado Project of Environmental Films. ISBN 1-879362-02-3.
  - — (July 1993). Significant Tornadoes 1680–1991: A Chronology and Analysis of Events. St. Johnsbury, Vermont: The Tornado Project of Environmental Films. ISBN 1-879362-03-1.
  - — (2001a). The Tornado: Nature's Ultimate Windstorm. Norman: University of Oklahoma Press. ISBN 978-0-8061-3538-0.
  - — (2001b). F5-F6 Tornadoes. St. Johnsbury, Vermont: The Tornado Project of Environmental Films.
- "Severe Local Storms for January 1949". Monthly Weather Review. 77 (1). Washington, D.C.: United States Weather Bureau: 26–7. January 1949. Bibcode:1949MWRv...77...26.. doi:10.1175/1520-0493(1949)077<0026:SLSFJ>2.0.CO;2 – via American Meteorological Society.
