= 1965 Palm Sunday tornado outbreak =

Natural disaster in the US

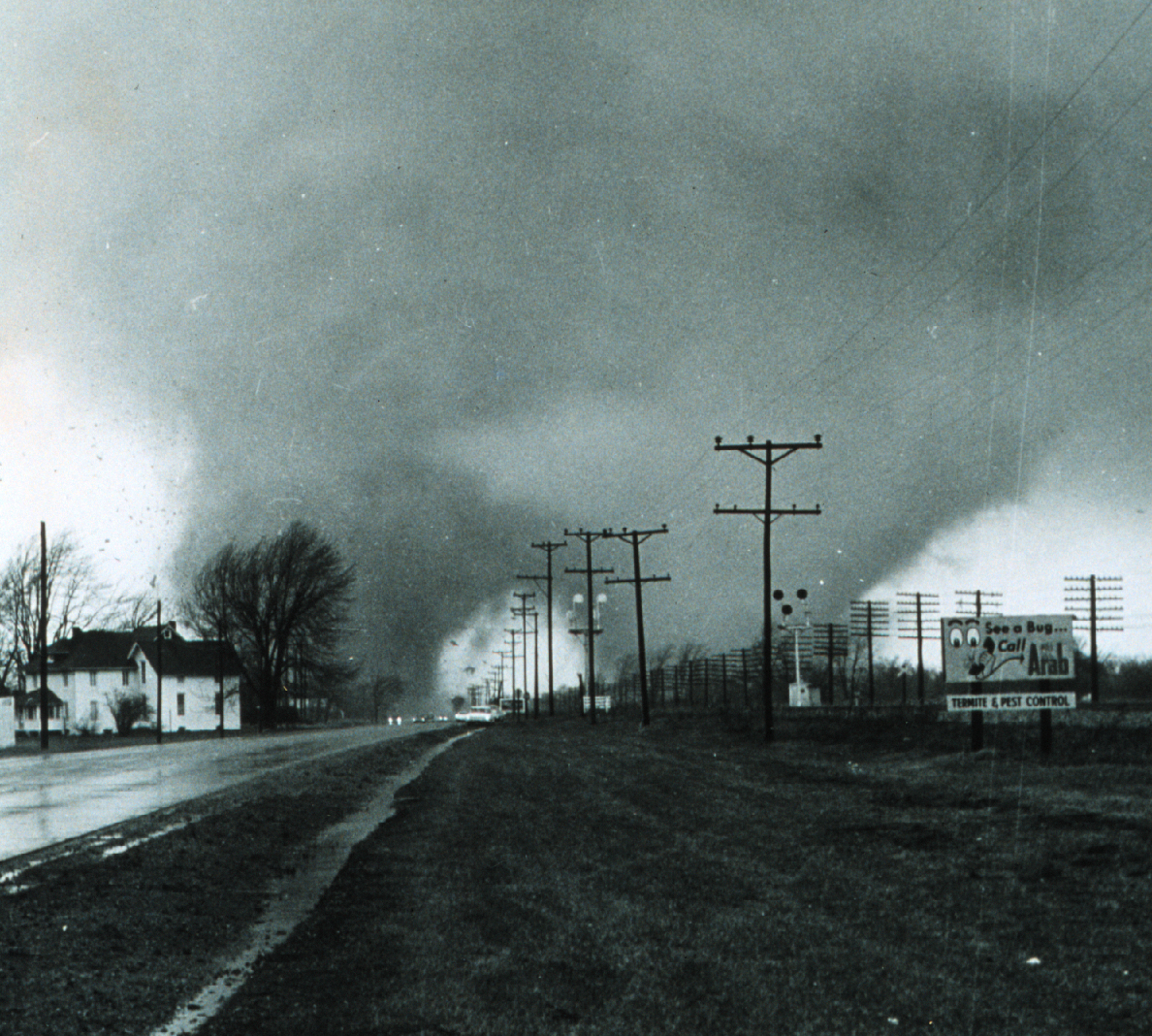
- The F4 tornado that struck Midway, Indiana, between Goshen and Dunlap

Meteorological history
- Duration: April 10–12, 1965

Tornado outbreak
- Tornadoes: 55 confirmed
- Max. rating: F4 tornado
- Duration: 1 day and 16 hours
- Highest gusts: Non-tornadic – 80 mph (130 km/h) at three locations on April 11
- Largest hail: 2 in (5.1 cm) at seven locations on April 10–12

Overall effects
- Fatalities: 266 fatalities
- Injuries: 3,662 injuries
- Damage: $1.217 billion (1965 USD) (Note: All losses are in 1965 USD unless otherwise noted.) $12.4 billion (2025 USD)
- Areas affected: Southern and Midwestern United States (Upland South, Driftless Area, and Great Lakes region, primarily Indiana, Ohio, and Michigan)
- Part of the tornadoes and tornado outbreaks of 1965

The 1965 Palm Sunday tornado outbreak was a historic severe weather event that affected the Midwestern and Southeastern United States on April 10–12, 1965. The tornado outbreak produced 55 confirmed tornadoes in one day and 16 hours. The worst part of the outbreak occurred during the afternoon hours of April 11 into the overnight hours going into April 12. The second-largest tornado outbreak on record at the time, this deadly series of tornadoes inflicted a swath of destruction from Cedar County, Iowa, to Cuyahoga County, Ohio, and a swath 450 miles long (724 km) from Kent County, Michigan, to Montgomery County, Indiana. The main part of the outbreak lasted 16 hours and 35 minutes and is among the most intense outbreaks, in terms of tornado strength, ever recorded, including at least four "double/twin funnel" tornadoes. In all, the outbreak killed 266 people, injured 3,662 others, and caused $1.217 billion (1965 USD) in damage. (Note: An outbreak is generally defined as a group of at least six tornadoes (the number sometimes varies slightly according to local climatology) with no more than a six-hour gap between individual tornadoes. An outbreak sequence, prior to (after) the start of modern records in 1950, is defined as a period of no more than two (one) consecutive days without at least one significant (F2 or stronger) tornado.) (Note: The Fujita scale was devised under the aegis of scientist T. Theodore Fujita in the early 1970s. Prior to the advent of the scale in 1971, tornadoes in the United States were officially unrated. While the Fujita scale has been superseded by the Enhanced Fujita scale in the U.S. since February 1, 2007, Canada used the old scale until April 1, 2013; nations elsewhere, like the United Kingdom, apply other classifications such as the TORRO scale.) (Note: Historically, the number of tornadoes globally and in the United States was and is likely underrepresented: research by Grazulis on annual tornado activity suggests that, as of 2001, only 53% of yearly U.S. tornadoes were officially recorded. Documentation of tornadoes outside the United States was historically less exhaustive, owing to the lack of monitors in many nations and, in some cases, to internal political controls on public information. Most countries only recorded tornadoes that produced severe damage or loss of life. Significant low biases in U.S. tornado counts likely occurred through the early 1990s, when advanced NEXRAD was first installed and the National Weather Service began comprehensively verifying tornado occurrences.)

In 2023, tornado expert Thomas P. Grazulis created the outbreak intensity score (OIS) as a way to rank various tornado outbreaks. The 1965 Palm Sunday tornado outbreak received an OIS of 238, making it the fourth-worst tornado outbreak in recorded history.

== Meteorological synopsis ==
A vigorous extratropical cyclone centered over the northeastern High Plains, in the region of the Dakotas, was the primary catalyst for widespread severe weather on April 11, 1965. As early as the preceding day, a strong jet stream in the upper two-thirds of the troposphere traversed the southern Great Plains and was responsible for an outbreak of tornadoes from the Kansas–Missouri border to Central Arkansas, including a violent F4 tornado that struck the town of Conway in Faulkner County, Arkansas, killing six people and injuring 200. The following morning, at 7:00 a.m. CDT (12:00 UTC), data from radiosondes indicated wind speeds of 120–150 kn (140–170 mph; 220–280 km/h) between the altitudes of 18,000–30,000 ft (5,500–9,100 m) over the Sonoran–Chihuahua Deserts and the Arizona/New Mexico Mountains. Meanwhile, at 10,000 ft (3,000 m), winds of 70 kn (81 mph; 130 km/h) impinged on the southern Great Plains. Retreating northward, a warm front interacted with a shortwave to produce isolated thunderstorms from northern Missouri and Central Illinois to the Lower Peninsula of Michigan.

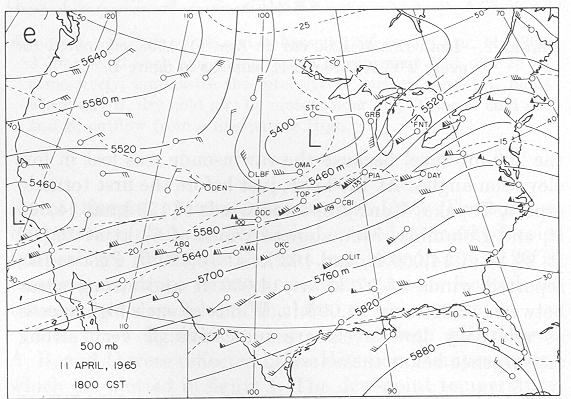
Synoptic-scale upper-air analysis late on April 11, 1965

The well-defined surface cyclone over the High Plains intensified as it headed into Iowa, its central pressure decreasing from 990 to 985 mb (29.23 to 29.09 inHg) by 1:00 p.m. CDT (18:00 UTC). As the warm front bisected central Iowa and stretched into Illinois and Indiana, a cold front and very dry air aloft—indicative of a potent elevated mixed layer—departed from eastern Kansas. Strong winds transported steep lapse rates within the elevated mixed layer eastward across the Great Plains. Concomitant destabilization of the atmosphere occurred over the warm sector due to abundant sunshine from the elevated mixed layer. High temperatures ranged from 83 to 85 °F (28 to 29 °C) from Chicago to St. Louis. Simultaneously, a strong low-level jet stream brought a moistening air mass northward: dew points of at least 60 °F (16 °C) reached southernmost Illinois and Indiana by 10:00 a.m. CDT (15:00 UTC). Meanwhile, a pronounced dry line-like boundary near the cold front moved into eastern sections of Arkansas and Missouri. Weather stations from Topeka, Kansas, to Peoria, Illinois, showed very strong vertical shear that favored intense low-level convergence—combined with a moist dew point in the warm sector, an environment favorable for supercell thunderstorms.

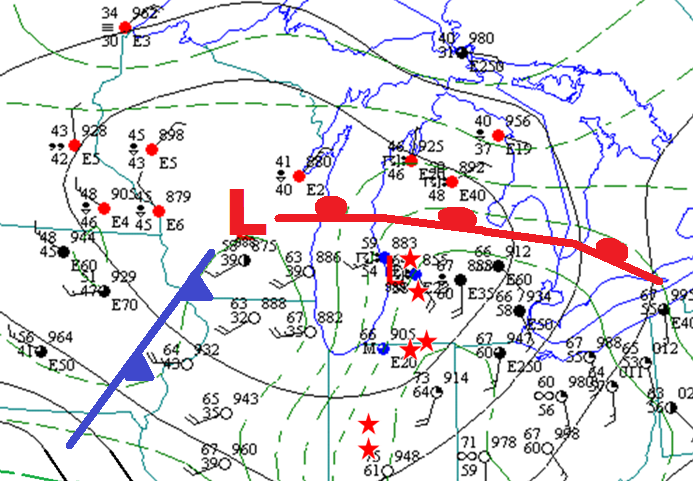
Surface weather analysis showing weather features late on April 11, 1965

A weather balloon launched from Dodge City, Kansas recorded winds of 185 mph (298 km/h) aloft; another at Peoria, Illinois, subsequently measured 135 kn (155 mph; 250 km/h). Minimum dew points of 60 °F (16 °C) reached as far north as southern Michigan by mid afternoon. Volatile atmospheric conditions led to thunderstorm activity over eastern Iowa by 1:40–48 p.m. CDT (18:40–48 UTC), the first supercell of which produced the initial tornado of the day. By 6:00 p.m. CDT (23:00 UTC), instability reached record proportions for the time of year over a wide area, with convective available potential energy (CAPE) of at least 1,000 J/kg in the mixed layer over much of Indiana and southernmost Michigan. Record-breaking ambient vertical wind shear in the lowest 6 km (3.7 mi; 20,000 ft; 6,000 m) of the atmosphere facilitated the explosive development of long-lived mesocyclones and thus long-tracked tornado families. The very strong shear and rapid forward speed of the storms—up to 70 mph (110 km/h) in some cases—may have enhanced the formation of cyclic supercells and could account for numerous reports of multiple mesocyclones and twin tornadoes, including the famous "twin tornadoes" near Elkhart, Indiana; similar conditions yielded the Tri-State Tornado, the longest-tracked and deadliest in U.S. history, on March 18, 1925.

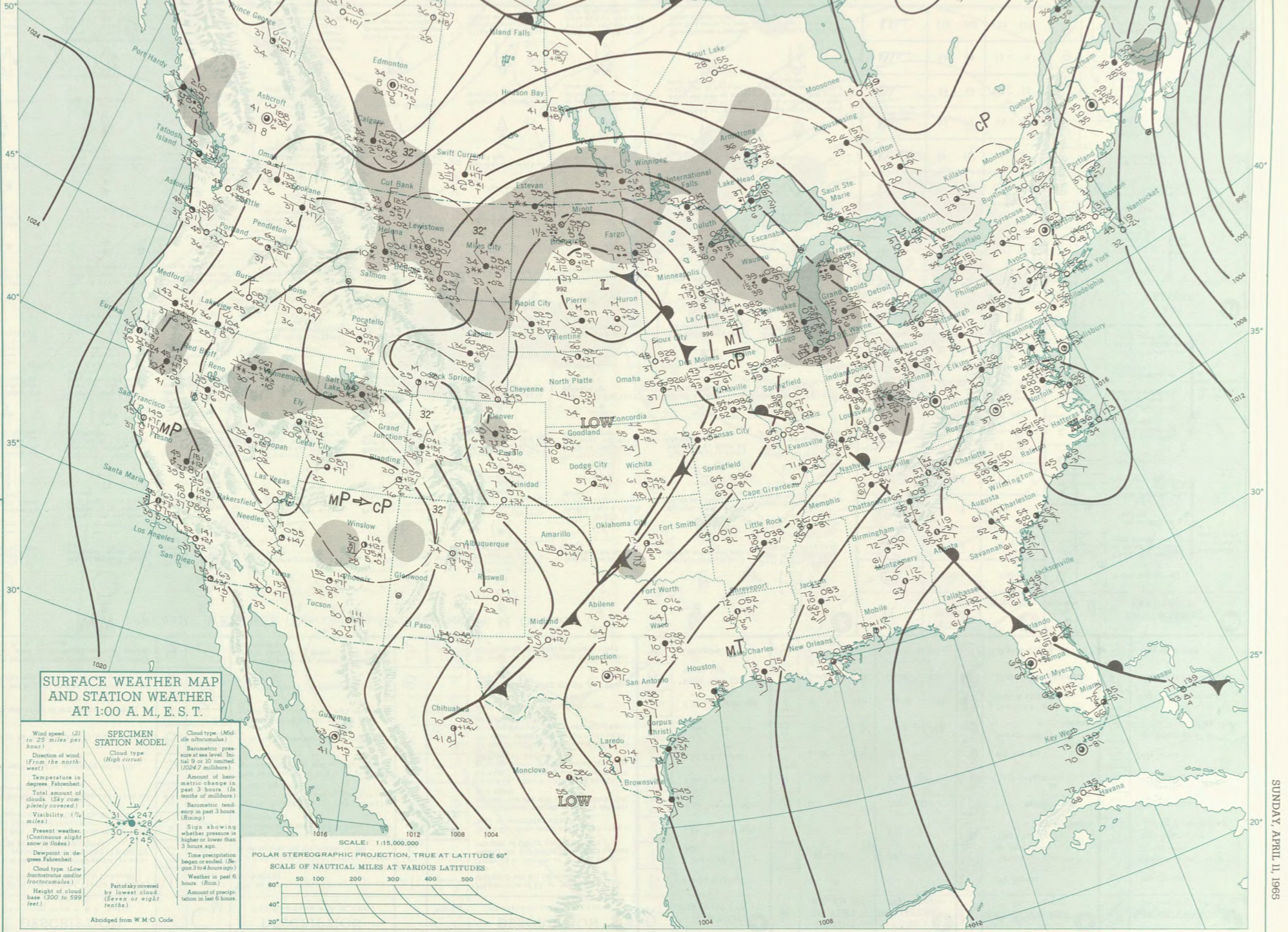
Surface weather map showing the Low-pressure system over the Midwestern United States on April 11

At 11:45 a.m. CDT (16:45 UTC) on April 11, the Severe Local Storms Unit (SELS) in Kansas City, Missouri, issued an outlook that mentioned the possibility of tornadoes from northeastern Missouri to the northernmost two-thirds of Indiana. (Note: This was known as a Severe Weather Forecast at the time.) At 2:00 p.m. CDT (19:00 UTC)—fifteen minutes after the first tornado was spotted—the first tornado watch of the day was issued, covering portions of northern Illinois and southern Wisconsin. A total of four watches were issued on April 11–12. (Note: At the time tornado watches were called tornado forecasts; SELS only began using the former terminology in 1966, after the Palm Sunday event. Respondents to a post-event survey noted that they confused tornado warnings with tornado forecasts; in turn, this contributed to the high death toll on April 11–12.) Radio news reporter Martin Jensen, then stationed at the WMT Station in Cedar Rapids, reported the first tornado of the day forming at 1:45 p.m. CDT (18:45 UTC). The station was equipped with a Collins Radio aviation radar mounted on the roof of the station building and was used to support severe weather reports on local and regional newscasts. After detecting the severe thunderstorm, the reporter called Weather Bureau offices in Waterloo (which had no radar) and Des Moines to alert them about the storm. The phone call became the first hard evidence for the Weather Bureau regarding the growing threat of severe storms that spawned dozens of tornadoes over the next 12 hours. For the first time in the U.S. Weather Bureau's history, an entire Weather Bureau Office's jurisdiction, in Northern Indiana, was under a tornado warning; this was termed a "blanket tornado warning" and was later used by several National Weather Service (NWS) offices on April 3, 1974.

== Confirmed tornadoes ==
Confirmed tornadoes by Fujita rating
FU	F0	F1	F2	F3	F4	F5	Total
0	1	15	15	6	18	0	55

=== Crystal Lake–Burtons Bridge, Illinois ===
Crystal Lake–Burtons Bridge, Illinois
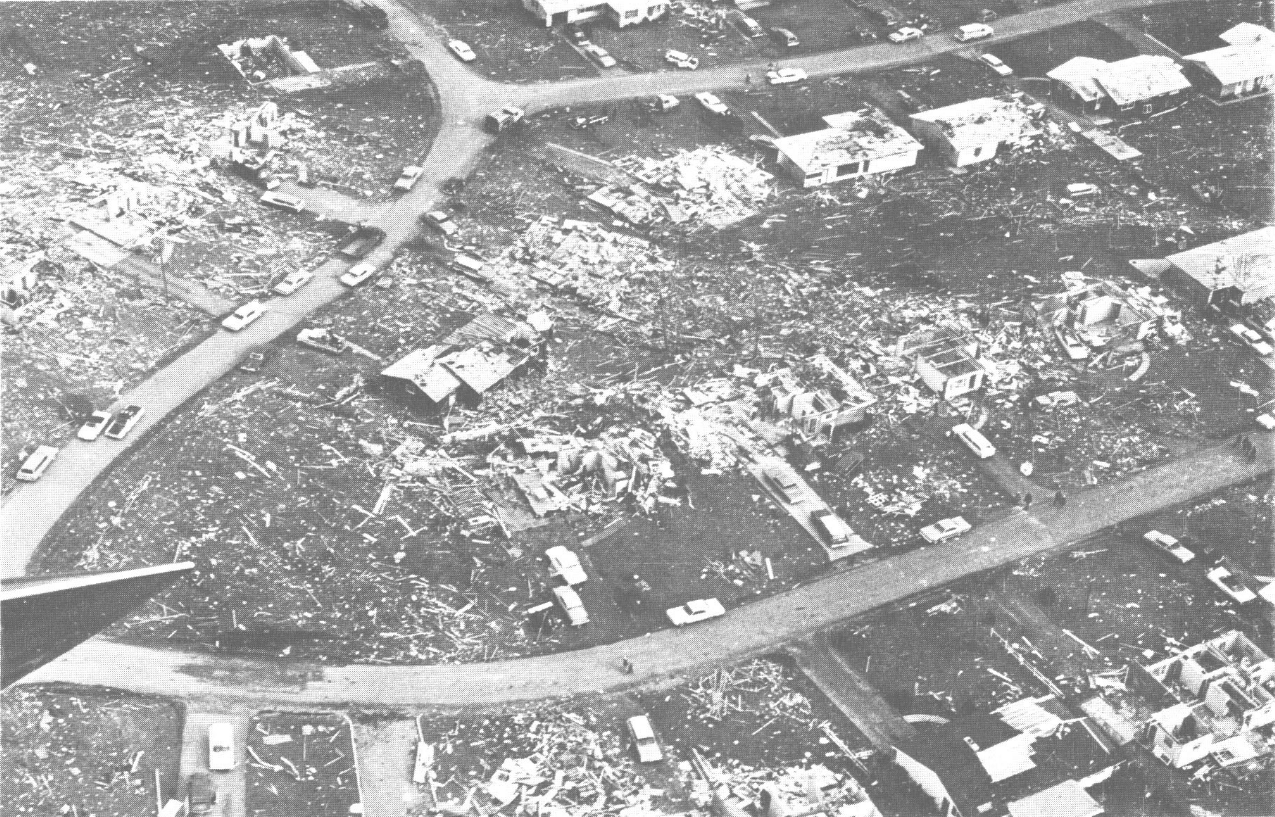
- Damage in Crystal Lake, Illinois near the beginning of the tornado's path

Meteorological history
- Formed: April 11, 1965 , 3:20 p.m. CDT (UTC−05:00)
- Dissipated: April 11, 1965 , 3:42 p.m. CDT (UTC−05:00)
- Duration: 22 minutes

F4 tornado
- on the Fujita scale
- Path length: 9.10 miles (14.65 km)
- Highest winds: 207–260 mph (333–418 km/h)

Overall effects
- Fatalities: 6
- Injuries: 75
- Damage: $1.5 million (1965 USD) $15.9 million (2026 USD)
- Areas affected: McHenry County, Lake County, in the Chicago suburbs

This devastating tornado was first detected at 3:27 p.m. CDT (21:27 UTC), but officially touched down seven minutes earlier at exactly 3:20 p.m. (21:20 UTC), in Lakewood. At that time the tornado first produced visible damage at the Crystal Lake Country Club; two firs on the golf course were prostrated. Initially narrow, the tornado subsequently and rapidly widened to 1,300 feet (400 m). Crossing Nash Street and McHenry Avenue in Crystal Lake, the tornado unroofed or severely damaged several houses. Alongside U.S. Route 14 the tornado claimed its first fatality, a man in a barn. Nearby gas stations and a strip mall were damaged. At the latter place, a roof sheltering a Piggly Wiggly and a Neisner's collapsed, trapping 20 or more people below. The tornado tossed cars about in the parking lot as well. Shortly afterward, the tornado struck the Colby subdivision, destroying or severely damaging 155 homes. F4-level damage occurred as several homes were completely swept off their foundations. Four deaths occurred in the neighborhood, including three in one family (the Holter family) whose home was obliterated. Their bodies were located two blocks distant and a pickup truck was found to have landed in the basement. The tornado scattered debris from the Colby subdivision up to a one-half mile (0.80 km) away.

After ravaging the Colby neighborhood, the tornado destroyed several warehouses and shattered windows. A diesel plant, a wallpaper factory, and a manufacturer sustained damage ranging from light to heavy. The tornado then extensively damaged the Orchard Acres subdivision, crossed Illinois Route 31, and apparently weakened before impacting farmland. A few barns and isolated trees were damaged. The tornado may have dissipated and reformed as a new tornado near the Fox River. The tornado also struck the community of Burtons Bridge. The tornado, now 500 to 800 yards (460 to 730 m) wide, then restrengthened and felled mature oak trees as it crested a precipitous hill before striking Bay View Beach. There the tornado badly damaged several homes and downed willow trees. Finally, the tornado intersected Illinois Route 176 and produced its final swath of significant damage in Island Lake. In Island Lake the tornado tossed boats ashore, wrecked piers, and caused homes to collapse, resulting in one additional death. The tornado also displaced several homes from their foundations. The tornado neared U.S. Route 12 as it dissipated at 3:42 p.m. CST (21:42 UTC). Damage estimates were set at about $1.5 million.

=== Wakarusa–Midway–Middlebury, Indiana ===
Wakarusa–Midway–Middlebury, Indiana
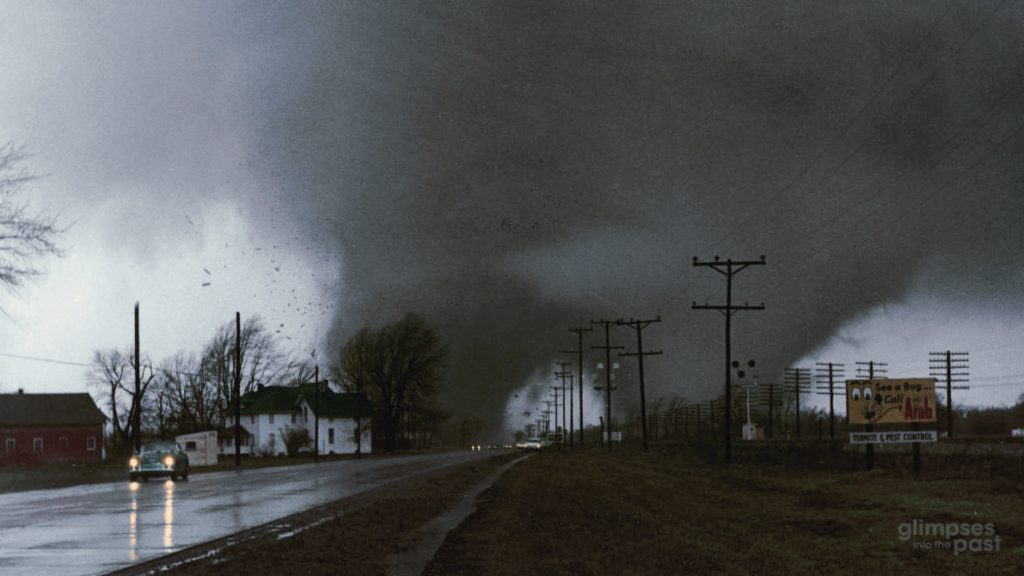
- Photograph of the tornado over the Midway trailer court, showcasing multiple vortices

Meteorological history
- Formed: April 11, 1965 , 5:15 p.m. CDT (UTC−05:00)
- Dissipated: April 11, 1965 , 5:57 p.m. CDT (UTC−05:00)
- Duration: 42 minutes

F4 tornado
- on the Fujita scale
- Highest winds: 207–260 mph (333–418 km/h)

Overall effects
- Fatalities: 31
- Injuries: 252
- Areas affected: Wakarusa, Goshen, Midway, Middlebury

This violent and destructive tornado was the most famous and well-publicized of the Palm Sunday tornadoes, often remembered as the first of two F4 tornadoes to hit the Dunlap (Elkhart)–Goshen area. It formed near the St. Joseph–Elkhart County border and tracked northeastward, striking Wakarusa, where it caused severe damage and killed a child. The tornado then intensified significantly as it moved toward northern Goshen and the Midway Trailer Court. As it neared the trailer park, Elkhart Truth reporter Paul Huffman, then reporting on severe weather, overheard a report of a tornado approaching his position on U.S. Route 33, about 1 mile (1.6 km) south of Midway. As Huffman and his wife Betty awaited the storm, he noticed the tornado approaching from the southwest, so he began taking a series of photographs, six in all. The photographs captured the evolution of the storm into twin funnels as it struck the trailer park, with each funnel gyrating around a central point yet only producing one damage swath. The tornado struck the trailer park at 6:32 p.m. CDT (23:32 UTC). (Roughly 45 minutes later, another F4 tornado passed just to the north of the Midway Trailer Court, splitting into yet another pair of funnels as it struck the Sunnyside neighborhood in Dunlap.) The tornado obliterated roughly 80% of the trailer park, with 10 deaths, and caused F4 damage to numerous other homes near Middlebury, some of which were swept clean. Three more people died in the Middlebury area before the tornado ended. Unofficial estimates of the death toll vary, with Grazulis listing 14 deaths instead of the 31 appearing in the official National Climatic Data Center/National Centers for Environmental Information (NCDC/NCEI) database. An airplane wing from Goshen Airport was found 35 miles (56 km) away in Centreville, Michigan.

Ted Fujita lists this event as two tornadoes.

=== Orland, Indiana/Coldwater Lake–southern Hillsdale–Manitou Beach–Devils Lake–southern Tecumseh, Michigan (two tornadoes) ===
Southern Michigan (two tornadoes)
- The first tornado seen near the border of Branch and Hillsdale Counties.

Meteorological history
- Formed: April 11, 1965 , 7:15 p.m. CDT (UTC−05:00)
- Dissipated: April 11, 1965 , 10:03 p.m. CDT (UTC−05:00)
- Duration: 2 hours, 48 minutes

Overall effects
- Fatalities: 44
- Injuries: 587
- Damage: $32 million (1965 USD) $327 million (2025 USD)

Tornado family
- Tornadoes: 2
- Max. rating: F4 tornado
- Highest winds: 207–260 mph (333–418 km/h)

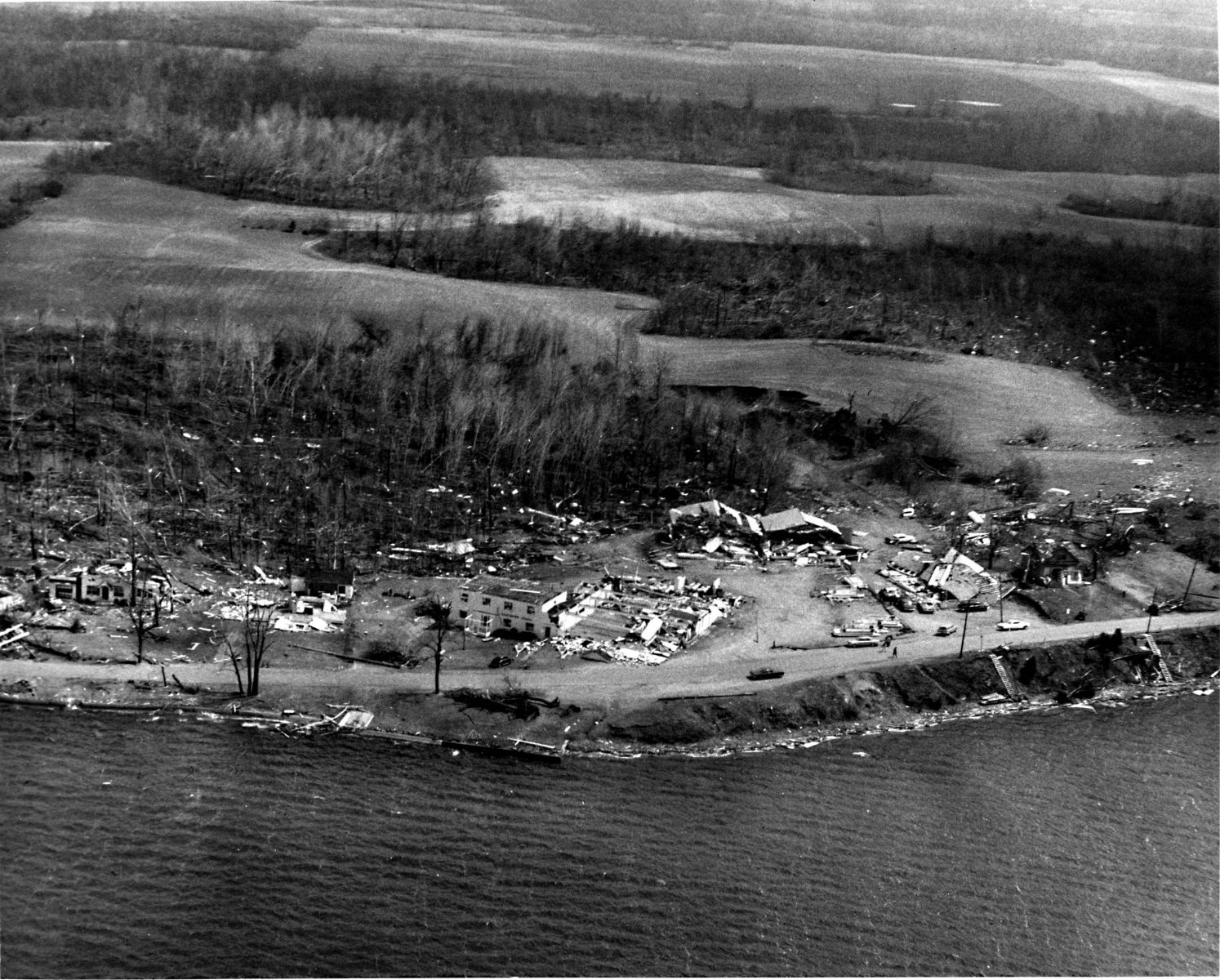
Destruction in the Coldwater area after the tornadoes

With the telephone lines down, emergency services in Elkhart County, Indiana, could not warn Michigan residents that the tornadoes were headed their way. From the Detroit Metropolitan Airport, the radar operator at the U.S. Weather Bureau Office (WBO) observed that the thunderstorms over Northern Indiana and western Lower Michigan were moving east-northeastward at 70 mph (110 km/h). Of the southernmost counties of Michigan, all but three—Berrien, Cass, and St. Joseph—were hit.

These deadly and enormous tornadoes all formed in Michigan, with one of the 2 supercells forming just south of the Indiana-Michigan state line. With the first, being the deadliest, and strongest of the two tornadoes forming near Orland, debarking trees and leveling homes on the shoreline of Lake Pleasant in Steuben County. Crossing into Branch County, Michigan, the tornado damaged more homes in East Gilead. The tornado was up to 1 mile (1.6 km) wide as it obliterated homes on Coldwater Lake; 18 deaths occurred there. Debris from the empty foundations was strewn over the surface of the lake and deposited in a small cove. The tornado destroyed 200 homes and caused one additional death as it traversed Branch County. After striking Coldwater Lake, the tornado widened even further, up to 2 miles (3.2 km) across, destroying a century-old farmhouse and killing a family of six near Reading. The tornado then narrowed back to 1 mile (1.6 km) as it struck Baw Beese Lake, near the southern edge of Hillsdale. The tornado hurled a New York Central Railroad freight train into Baw Beese Lake. Across Hillsdale County the tornado killed 11 or more people and destroyed 177 homes.

Entering Lenawee County, the tornado traversed the Irish Hills and approached Manitou Beach–Devils Lake. As it struck Manitou Beach–Devils Lake, the tornado destroyed the Manitou Beach Baptist Church; of the 50 people then in attendance for Palm Sunday services, 26 failed to reach shelter in time and were stranded beneath debris for up to two hours. Eight fatalities occurred in the church. The local dance pavilion on Devils Lake was demolished, having recently been rebuilt after a fire on Labor Day in 1963. One of the tornadoes damaged parts of Onsted; in the nearby village of Tipton, which suffered a direct hit, 94% of the town's buildings were damaged or destroyed. Across Lenawee County the tornado destroyed 189 homes. About 30 minutes later, the Manitou Beach–Devils Lake area in Lenawee County was hit by the second of the two tornadoes, causing numerous fatalities, including a family of six in eastern Lenawee County who had survived the first tornado. Many homes were hit twice.

One or both F4 tornadoes struck the then-Village of Milan, south of Ann Arbor. The Wolverine Plastics building on the Monroe County side of town, then the top employer in the village, was destroyed with the roof being completely removed in the process. The Milan Junior High School was seriously damaged along with the adjacent, senior high school, disused since 1958, at Hurd and North streets, on the Washtenaw County side of Milan. Milan became a city in 1967; opened a new Middle School in 1969, which replaced the old Junior High School; and eventually demolished the 1900 building that housed the former junior and senior high schools.

The first of the F4 tornadoes produced a 151-mile-per-hour (243 km/h) wind gust at Tecumseh—the highest wind measurement in a tornado until a measurement of 276 mph (444 km/h) near Red Rock, Oklahoma, on April 26, 1991; a higher measurement of 301 mph (484 km/h)—later corrected to 321 mph (517 km/h)—in the F5 tornado of May 3, 1999, broke this record. Damage from the two tornadoes was difficult to separate and covered more than 2 to 4 miles (3.2 to 6.4 km) across, including much downburst and microburst destruction. Total damage estimates from the two tornadoes were $32 million with more than 550 homes, a church, and 100 cottages destroyed.

=== Dunlap, Indiana ===
Dunlap, Indiana
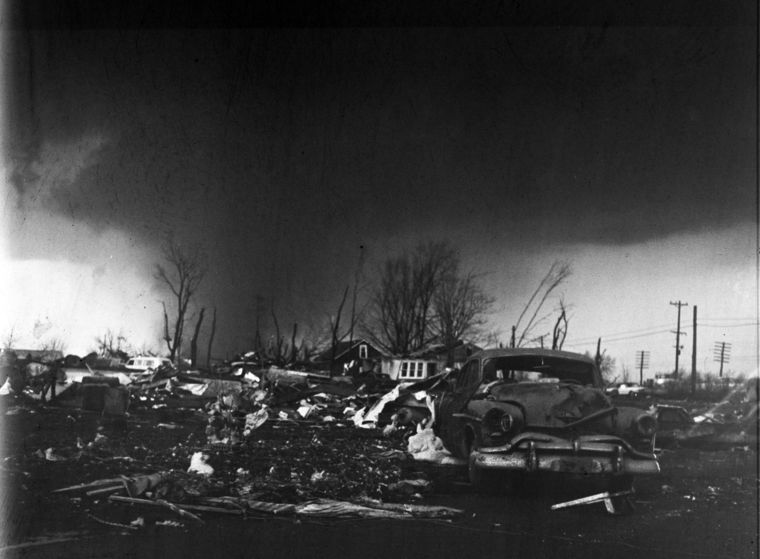
- The violent tornado at peak intensity as seen from Midway. The damage in the foreground is from the first Elkhart tornado

Meteorological history
- Formed: April 11, 1965 , 6:00 p.m. CDT (UTC−05:00)
- Dissipated: April 11, 1965 , 7:08 p.m. CDT (UTC−05:00)
- Duration: 1 hour, 8 minutes

F4 tornado
- on the Fujita scale
- Highest winds: 260 mph (420 km/h)

Overall effects
- Fatalities: 36
- Injuries: 321

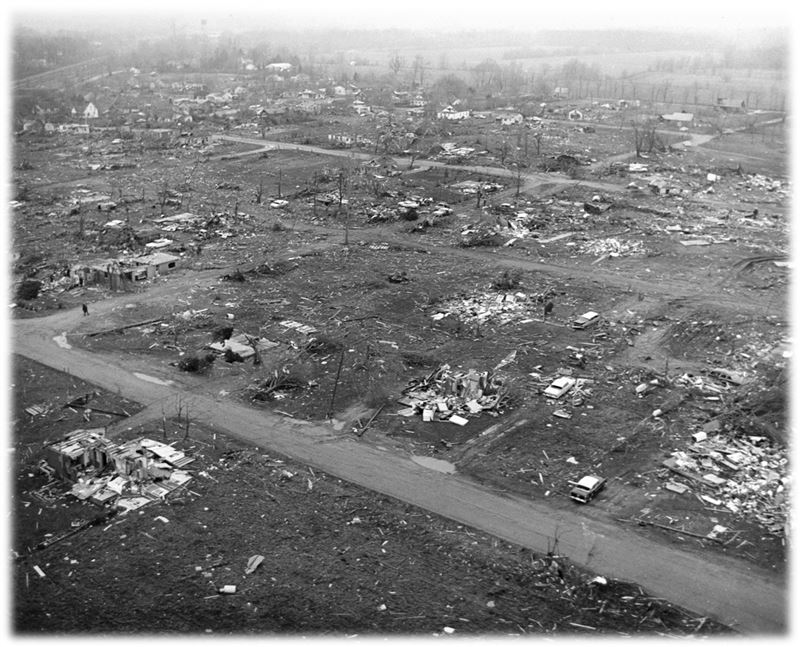
Extreme damage to the Sunnyside, subdivision in Dunlap, Indiana

This devastating and deadly tornado was the second and deadliest of two violent tornadoes to strike the Elkhart–Goshen area, with the highest single-tornado death toll in the outbreak. It hit Dunlap about an hour after another F4 tornado hit the Midway trailer park a short distance to the southeast. Few people received warning due to the passage of the earlier storm, which disrupted communications and downed power lines, thereby affecting rescue efforts after the earlier tornado as well. The Dunlap tornado first produced tree damage beginning just west of State Road 331. Prior to crossing the St. Joseph–Elkhart county line, the tornado claimed its first two fatalities. As the tornado neared Dunlap, it intensified into an extremely violent tornado. It then devastated the Sunnyside Housing addition and the unoccupied Sunnyside Mennonite Church. The Sunnyside subdivision was completely destroyed, with many homes swept away. The Kingston Heights subdivision was similarly devastated. The death toll from the two subdivisions was 28 people, with another six killed in a home and truck stop at the junction of State Road 15 and U.S. Route 20. The Palm Sunday Tornado Memorial Park now exists near this location, at the corner of County Road 45 and Cole Street in Dunlap (41°38′29″N 85°55′31″W). After striking Dunlap, the tornado apparently weakened somewhat, but still generated extensive damage eastward to Hunter Lake. Shortly before dissipating, the tornado tossed cars off the Indiana Turnpike near Scott. Like the Midway tornado, the Dunlap event was also witnessed as twin funnels: a photographer standing amidst the wreckage of the Midway Trailer Court captured the Dunlap tornado as it passed just to the north. It may have been the strongest tornado on April 11; in fact, Grazulis and other sources have assigned an F5 rating to the tornado, though it is officially rated F4.

=== Russiaville–Alto–Kokomo–Greentown–Marion, Indiana ===
Russiaville–Alto–southern Kokomo–Greentown–southern Marion, Indiana
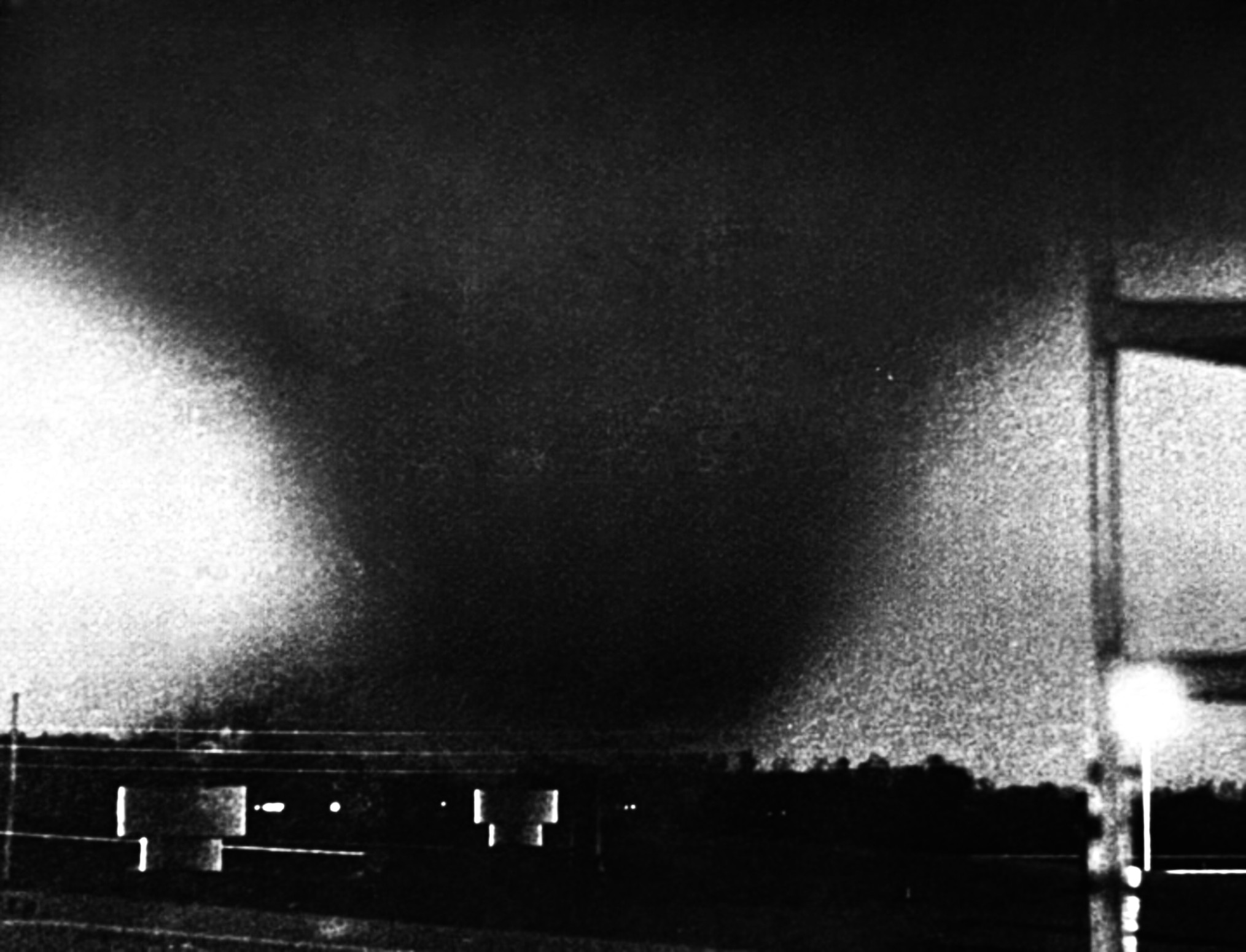
- The tornado at peak intensity as it tracked through Alto and southern Kokomo

Meteorological history
- Formed: April 11, 1965 , 7:20 p.m. CDT (UTC−05:00)
- Dissipated: April 11, 1965 , 8:05 p.m. CDT (UTC−05:00)
- Duration: 45 minutes

F4 tornado
- on the Fujita scale
- Highest winds: 250 mph (400 km/h)

Overall effects
- Fatalities: 25
- Injuries: 835
- Damage: $500.025 million (1965 USD)

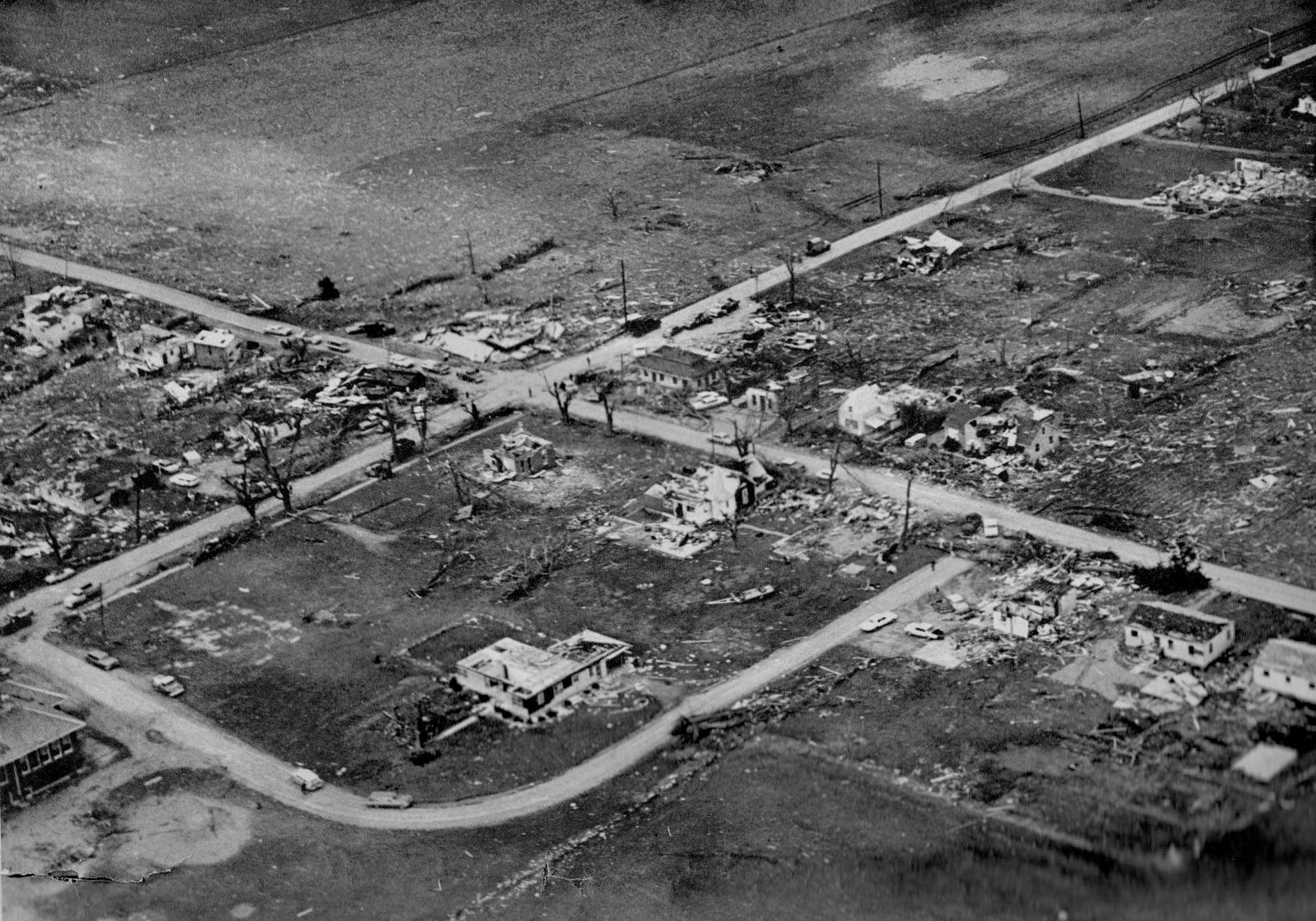
Aerial view of Alto, Indiana, following the tornado.

As the Lafayette–Middlefork tornado dissipated, this violent tornado developed nearby without a definite break in the damage path. Due to changes in the intensity of the damage, surveyors split the path into two separate tornadoes. At about 7:28 p.m. CDT (00:28 UTC), the new, rapidly strengthening tornado hit Russiaville, causing severe damage to the entire community. The 3/4-mile-wide (1.2 km) tornado destroyed or damaged 90% of the community, though most of the damage ranged from F0–F3. The tornado then widened to 1 mile (1.6 km) across as it moved into nearby Alto, causing F4-level damage to homes, before striking the southern edge of the larger city of Kokomo. Collectively, the tornado destroyed 100 homes in Alto and Kokomo. The Maple Crest apartment complex was unroofed and incurred the collapse of its uppermost walls. As the tornado continued eastward, it apparently intensified and killed ten people in Greentown, most of whom had been in automobiles. The tornado destroyed 80 homes, many of which it obliterated and swept away, as it struck multiple subdivisions in the Greentown area. In all, the tornado killed 18 people and injured another 600 in Howard County alone. Just south of Swayzee, the tornado leveled some more homes and caused three additional deaths. As it struck the southern outskirts of Marion, the tornado leveled a pair of homes, partly unroofed a Department of Veterans Affairs (VA) hospital, and wrecked the Panorama shopping center. 20 injuries occurred at the VA hospital, and looters scavenged the shopping center. Several homes were destroyed and hundreds others damaged in Marion as well. The tornado killed five people as it traversed Grant County. Losses totaled $500.025 million, $12 million alone of which occurred near Marion.

=== Pittsfield–Grafton–Strongsville, Ohio ===
Pittsfield–Grafton–Strongsville, Ohio
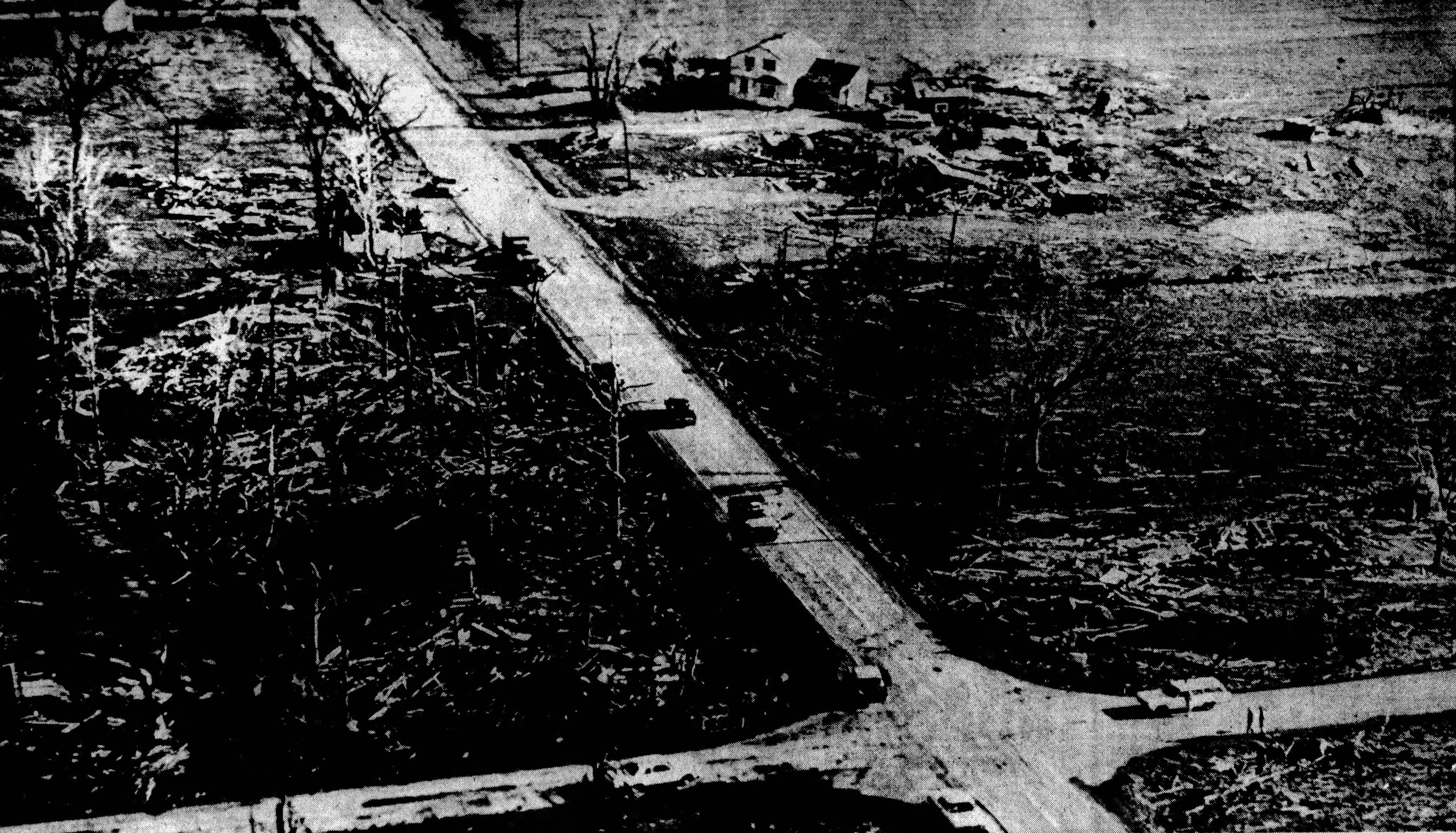
- The center of Pittsfield following the tornado

Meteorological history
- Formed: April 11, 1965 , 11:05 p.m. CDT (UTC−05:00)
- Dissipated: April 11, 1965 , 11:40 p.m. CDT (UTC−05:00)
- Duration: 35 minutes

F4 tornado
- on the Fujita scale
- Highest winds: 255 mph (410 km/h)

Overall effects
- Fatalities: 18
- Injuries: 200
- Damage: $50 million (1965 USD) $511 million (2025 USD)

Shortly after 11:00 p.m. CDT (04:00 UTC), this destructive tornado touched down in Lorain County, Ohio, and headed east-northeastward. Around 11:12 p.m. CDT (04:12 UTC), the 1/4-mile-wide (0.40 km) tornado struck Pittsfield, Ohio, then located at the junction of Ohio State Route 303 and Ohio State Road 58. Of the settlement's 50 residents, the tornado killed seven. The tornado also killed two motorists whose arrival in town coincided with the tornadoes. According to the U.S. Weather Bureau Office (WBO) in Cleveland, Ohio, the tornado produced "total" devastation as it struck Pittsfield. The tornado destroyed 12 homes, six of which "literally vanished," along with a combined gas station/grocery store, a pair of churches, and the town hall. The tornado also toppled a statue at a Civil War monument, but the concrete base of the statue remained standing.

After ravaging Pittsfield, the tornado damaged 200 homes in and near Grafton, some of which indicated F2-level intensity. A total of 17 homes were severely damaged in nearby LaGrange and Columbia Station. As the tornado reached the Cleveland metropolitan area, it diverged into two paths about a one-half mile (0.80 km) apart. Several witnesses also saw two funnels merging into one, similar to the Midway–Dunlap tornadoes. Large trees situated 50 feet (15 m) apart were found to have been felled in opposite directions. The tornado displayed borderline-F5-level damage in northernmost Strongsville. There, 18 homes were leveled, some of which were cleanly swept from their foundations, and 50 others were severely damaged in town. Damages amounted to at least $5 million and are officially listed as $50 million. Grazulis classified the tornado as an F5, but it is officially rated F4.

== Non-tornadic effects ==
Outbreak death toll
State	Total	County	County total
Arkansas	6	Faulkner	6
Iowa	1	Cedar	1
Illinois	6	McHenry	6
Indiana	137	Adams	1
Indiana	137	Boone	20
Indiana	137	Elkhart	62
Indiana	137	Grant	8
Indiana	137	Hamilton	6
Indiana	137	Howard	17
Indiana	137	Lagrange	10
Indiana	137	Marshall	3
Indiana	137	Montgomery	2
Indiana	137	St. Joseph	3
Indiana	137	Starke	4
Indiana	137	Wells	1
Michigan	53	Allegan	1
Michigan	53	Branch	18
Michigan	53	Clinton	1
Michigan	53	Hillsdale	6
Michigan	53	Kent	5
Michigan	53	Lenawee	9
Michigan	53	Monroe	13
Ohio	60	Allen	11
Ohio	60	Cuyahoga	1
Ohio	60	Delaware	4
Ohio	60	Hancock	2
Ohio	60	Lorain	17
Ohio	60	Lucas	16
Ohio	60	Mercer	2
Ohio	60	Seneca	4
Ohio	60	Shelby	3
Wisconsin	3	Jefferson	3
Totals	266		
All deaths were tornado-related

A vigorous, pre-frontal squall line generated severe thunderstorm winds from eastern Iowa to lakefront Illinois. Winds peaked at 70 kn (81 mph; 130 km/h) in Dixon, Illinois, and an anemometer at O'Hare International Airport in Chicago registered 60 kn (69 mph; 110 km/h). The strong winds, coupled with hail, damaged or destroyed numerous structures, felled trees, and downed utility wires. Across Northern Illinois, numerous funnel clouds were sighted in Wheaton, Carol Stream, Winfield, West Chicago, Aurora, and Rockford, respectively. Thunderstorms also generated hail of up to 2 in (5.1 cm) in diameter as well; 2-inch-diameter (5.1 cm) measurements occurred from South Dakota, Oklahoma, and Arkansas to Indiana, Mississippi, and Georgia on April 10–12.

== Aftermath and recovery ==
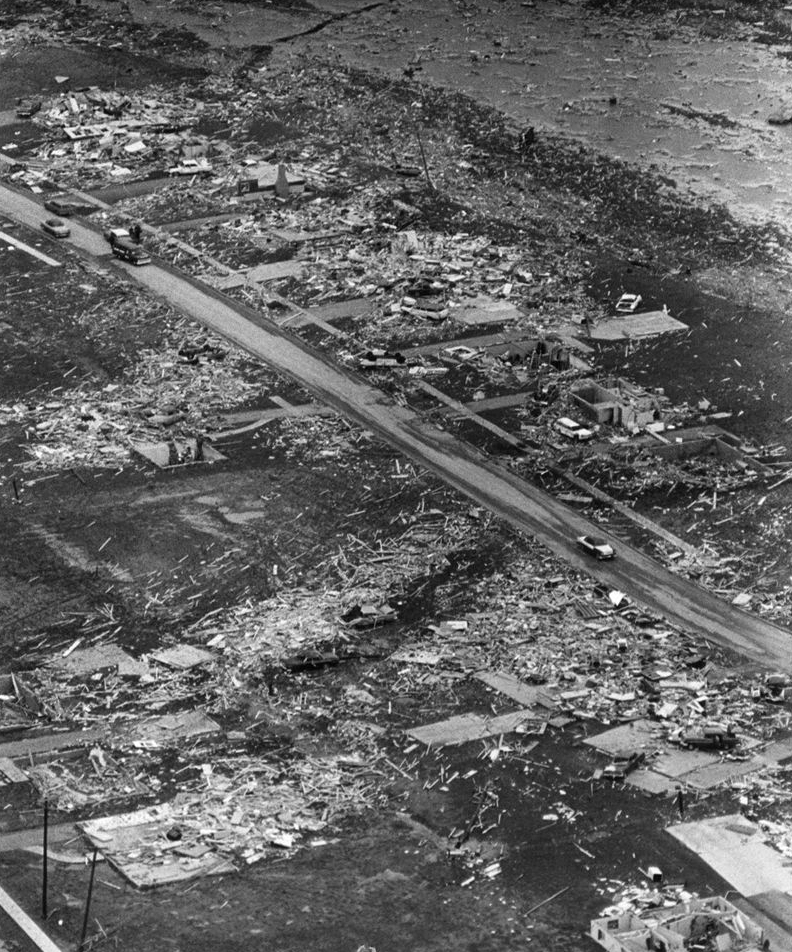
Damage in Toledo, Ohio, following the F4 tornado of April 11, 1965

In the Midwest, at least 266 people—some sources say 256–271—were killed and 1,500 injured (1,200 in Indiana). This is the fourth-deadliest day for tornadoes on record, behind April 3, 1974 (310 deaths), April 27, 2011 (324), and March 18, 1925 (747, including 695 by the Tri-State Tornado). It occurred on Palm Sunday, an important day in the Christian religion, and many people were attending services at church, one possible reason why some warnings were not received. There had been a late winter in 1965, much of March being cold and snowy; and as the day progressed, warm temperatures encouraged picnickers and sightseers. For many areas, April 11 marked the first day of above-average temperatures, so members of the public, being outdoors or attending services, failed to receive updates from radio and television. The high death toll in the outbreak despite accurate warnings led to changes in the dissemination of severe weather alerts by the Severe Local Storm Warning Center in Kansas City, Missouri, now the Norman, Oklahoma-based Storm Prediction Center. The U.S. Weather Bureau investigated the large number of deaths. Although weather radar stations were few and far between in 1965, the severe nature of the thunderstorms was identified with adequate time to disseminate warnings. But the warning system failed as the public never received them. Additionally, the public did not know the difference between a Forecast and an Alert. Thus the terms tornado watch and tornado warning were implemented in 1966. Pivotal to those clarifications was a meeting in the WMT Station's studio in Cedar Rapids, Iowa. Officials of the severe storms forecast center in Kansas City met with WMT meteorologist Conrad Johnson and News Director Grant Price. Their discussion led to establishment of the official "watch" and "warning" procedures in use since 1966. Additionally, communities began activating civil defense sirens during tornado warnings, and storm spotting via amateur radio networks and other media received increased logistical support and emphasis, leading to the eventual creation of SKYWARN. Five books on the 1965 Palm Sunday tornado outbreak have been penned to date. David Wagler of Indiana released "The Mighty Whirlwind" in 1966, interviewing survivors and eyewitnesses within months after the tornadoes. Dan Cherry released "Night of the Wind" in 2002; Roger Pickenpaugh published "The Night of the Wicked Winds" in 2003; Cherry wrote "50 Years Later" in 2015 with all-color images of the aftermath; and Janis Thornton published "The 1965 Palm Sunday Tornadoes in Indiana" in 2022.

== Oddities/records ==
Additionally, significant scientific data were gathered from aerial surveys of the tornado paths. The outbreak was the first to be studied in-depth aerially by tornado scientist Tetsuya Theodore Fujita, who proposed new theories about the structure of tornadoes based upon his study. Dr. Fujita discovered suction vortices during the Palm Sunday tornado outbreak. It had previously been thought the reason why tornadoes could hit one house and leave another across the street completely unscathed was because the tornado would "jump" from one house to another. However, Fujita discovered that the actual reason is most destruction is caused by suction vortices: small, intense mini-tornadoes within the main tornado.

The tornado outbreak generated 38 significant tornadoes, 18 of them violent—F4 or F5 on the Fujita scale of tornado intensity—and 22 deadly. Covering six states and about 335 mi^{2} (870 km^{2}), the outbreak killed 266 people and became the deadliest to hit the United States since 1936, although more recently the 1974 and 2011 Super Outbreaks claimed that distinction. The 17 violent tornadoes on April 11, 1965, set a 24-hour record that stood until the first Super Outbreak produced 30 in 1974. With 137 people killed and 1,200 injured in Indiana alone, the outbreak set a 24-hour record for tornado deaths in that state; it also generated nine tornadoes of F4 or greater intensity in the same state, which set a single-state record for an outbreak until April 3, 1974.

An unusually pronounced elevated mixed layer (EML) was present over the Great Lakes region during the outbreak—a similar pattern having been observed on March 28, 1920, April 3, 1956, and April 3, 1974. A strong jet stream, combined with tornadoes, lofted topsoil from Illinois and Missouri eastward, producing hazy skies prior to the arrival of storms.

Several witnesses of this tornado complex reported having seen white, blue, yellow, orange and red electrical lights being emitted by these tornadoes. Possible explanations for this include these tornadoes having collected electrically charged dust particles and electromagnetic forces having generated these tornadoes.

== See also ==
- Lists of tornadoes and tornado outbreaks
  - List of North American tornadoes and tornado outbreaks
- Tornado outbreak of April 2–3, 1956 – Produced a powerful F5 tornado family in Michigan
- 1920 Palm Sunday tornado outbreak – Generated deadly F4 tornadoes in the Great Lakes region
- 1994 Palm Sunday tornado outbreak – Yielded long-tracked, intense tornadoes from Alabama to the Carolinas
- 1974 Super Outbreak – Associated with numerous violent tornadoes across much of Indiana and Greater Cincinnati
- Disagreements on the intensity of tornadoes

== Sources ==
- Bontranger, Timothy E. (2005). The Palm Sunday Tornado. Instantpublisher.com. ISBN 978-1591969648.
- Brooks, Harold E. (April 2004). "On the Relationship of Tornado Path Length and Width to Intensity". Weather and Forecasting. 19 (2): 310–19. Bibcode:2004WtFor..19..310B. doi:10.1175/1520-0434(2004)019<0310:OTROTP>2.0.CO;2.
- Cherry, Dan (2002). Night of the Wind: The Palm Sunday Tornado of April 11, 1965 (Report). Adrian, Michigan: Lenawee County Historical Society.
- Clem, Dale (1997). Winds of fury, circles of grace: life after the Palm Sunday tornadoes. Nashville, Tennessee: Abingdon Press. ISBN 0-687-01795-5.
- Cook, A. R.; Schaefer, J. T. (August 2008). "The Relation of El Niño–Southern Oscillation (ENSO) to Winter Tornado Outbreaks". Monthly Weather Review. 136 (8): 3135. Bibcode:2008MWRv..136.3121C. doi:10.1175/2007MWR2171.1.
- E. S. Epstein; G. A. Petersen; H. Lieb; J. Davies; et al. (December 1974). The Widespread Tornado Outbreak of April 3-4, 1974: A Report to the Administrator (PDF). NWS Service Assessments (Report). Natural Disaster Survey Report. Rockville, Maryland: United States Department of Commerce. p. 18. "...warning offices issued 'blanket' warnings because they knew severe storms were in the area, although they did not know the exact location, extent, and movement of the storms."
- Fujita, T. T.; Bradbury, D. L.; Thullenar, C. L. (January 1970). "Palm Sunday tornadoes of April 11, 1965". Monthly Weather Review. 98 (1). Boston: American Meteorological Society: 30–1. Bibcode:1970MWRv...98...29F. doi:10.1175/1520-0493(1970)098<0029:PSTOA>2.3.CO;2.
- Grazulis, Thomas P. (November 1990). Significant Tornadoes 1880–1989. Vol. 2. St. Johnsbury, Vermont: The Tornado Project of Environmental Films. ISBN 1-879362-02-3.
- Grazulis, Thomas P. (July 1993). Significant Tornadoes 1680–1991: A Chronology and Analysis of Events. St. Johnsbury, Vermont: The Tornado Project of Environmental Films. ISBN 1-879362-03-1.
- Grazulis, Thomas P. (2001a). The Tornado: Nature's Ultimate Windstorm. Norman: University of Oklahoma Press. ISBN 978-0-8061-3538-0.
- Grazulis, Thomas P. (2001b). F5-F6 Tornadoes. St. Johnsbury, Vermont: The Tornado Project of Environmental Films.
- P. H. Kutschenreuter; R. Fox (1965). Report of Palm Sunday tornadoes of 1965 (PDF). NWS Service Assessments (Report). Natural Disaster Survey Report. Washington, D.C.: National Weather Service.
- National Weather Service (April 1965). "Storm Data and Unusual Weather Phenomena". Storm Data. 7 (4). Asheville, North Carolina: National Climatic Data Center.
- National Weather Service (April 1965). Storm Data Publication (Report). National Centers for Environmental Information – via Storm Events Database.
- Neal, Lott; Sam McCown; Tom Ross (August 2000) [1999]. 1998-1999 Tornadoes and a Long-Term U.S. Tornado Climatology (PDF) (Technical report). National Climatic Data Center Technical Report. Asheville, North Carolina: National Climatic Data Center. 99-02.
- King, Marshall (April 10, 2005). "One for the books". Elkhart Truth. Elkhart, Indiana.
- Pickenpaugh, Roger (2003). The Night of the Wicked Winds: the 1965 Palm Sunday tornadoes in Ohio. Baltimore, Maryland: Gateway Press. ISBN 0-9709059-3-9.
- Wagler, David (1966). The Mighty Whirlwind. Aylmer, Ontario: Pathway Publishing Corporation. LCCN 67112646.
