= Tornadoes of 1965 =

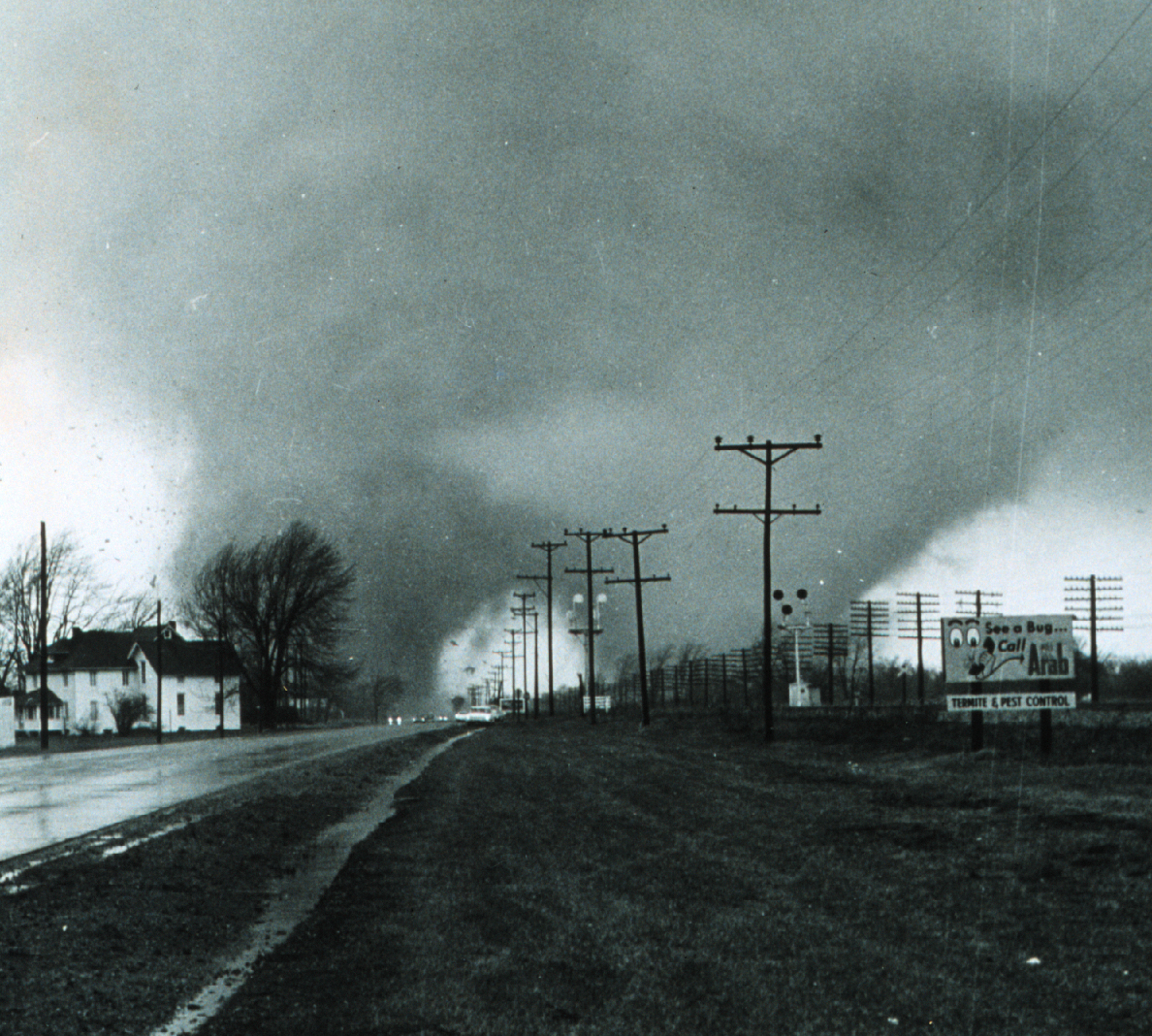
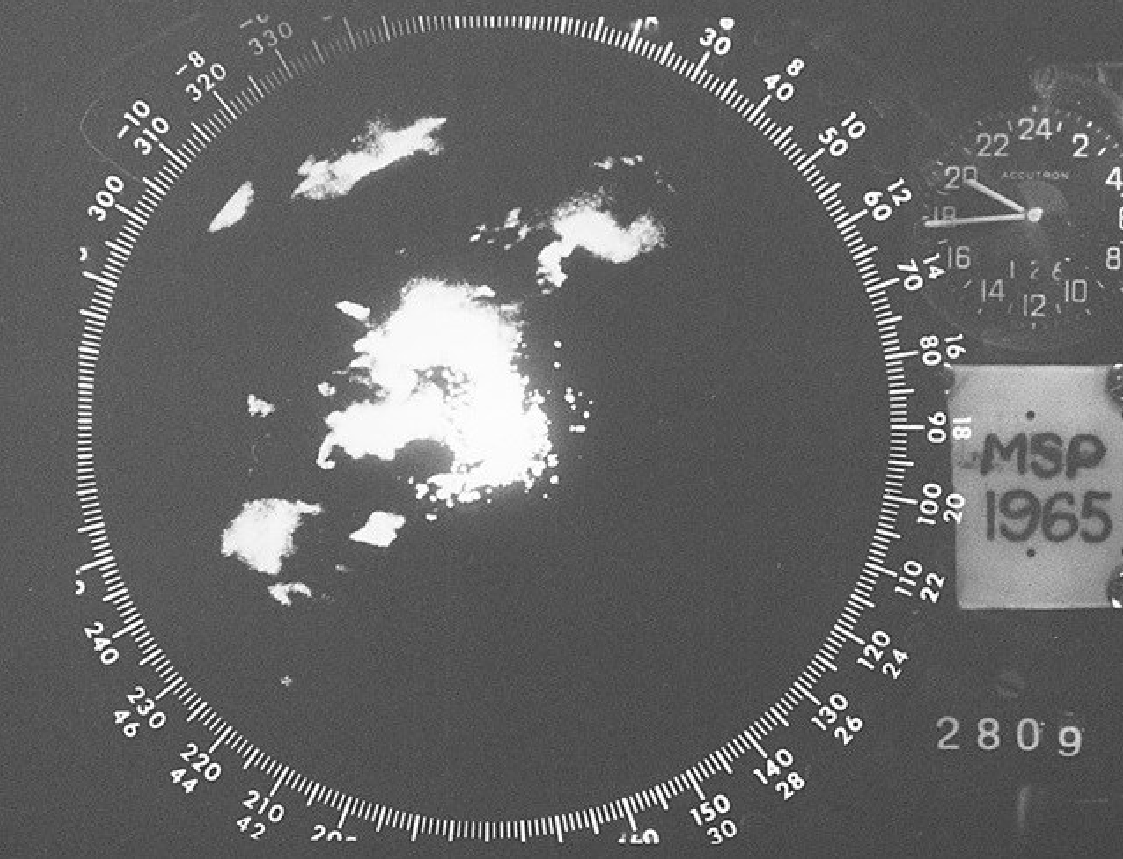
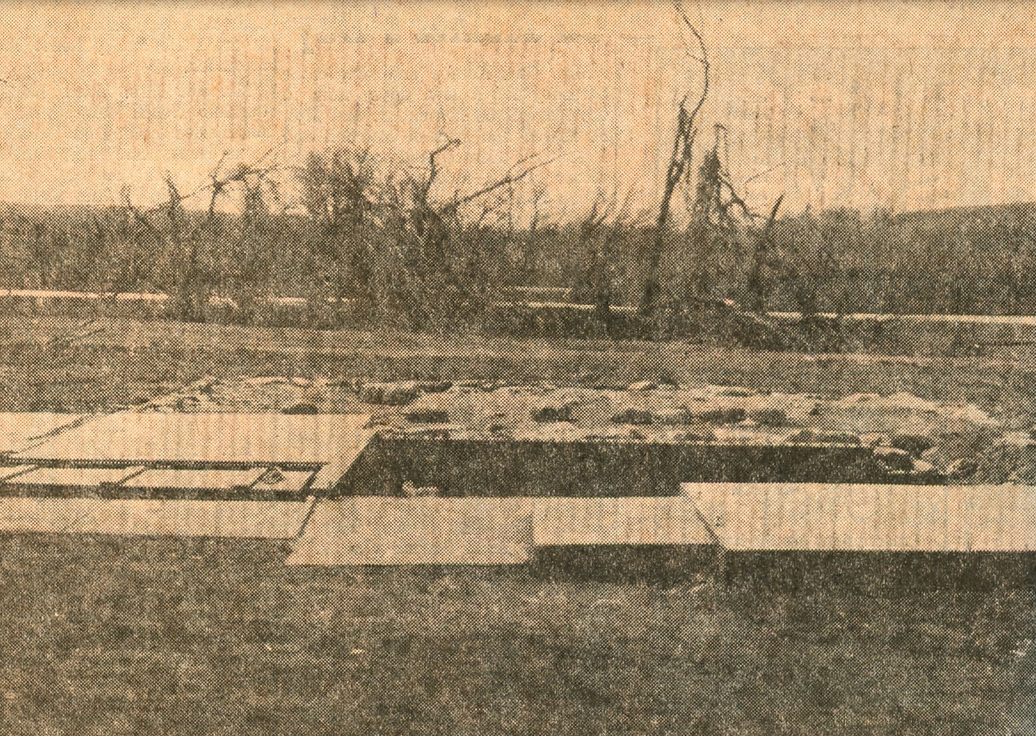
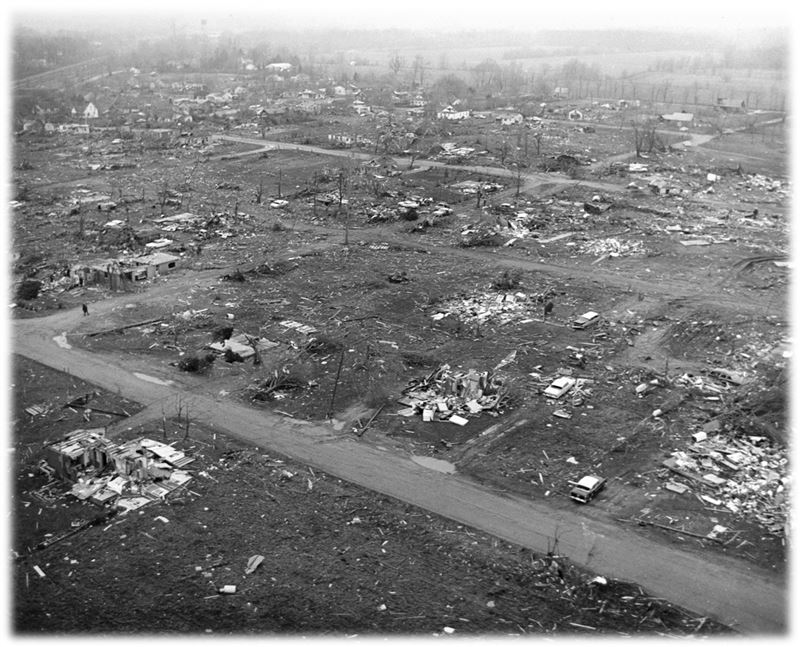
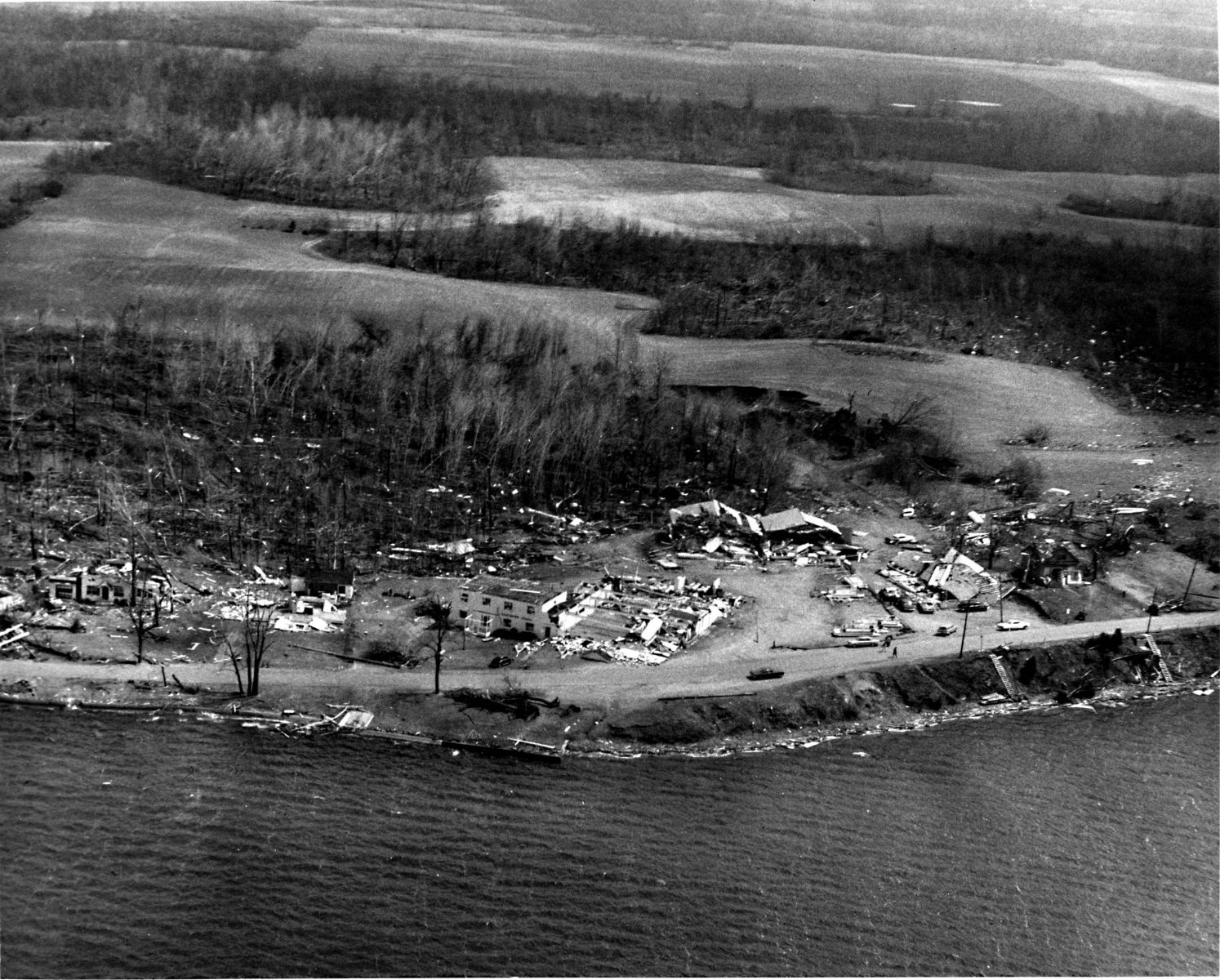
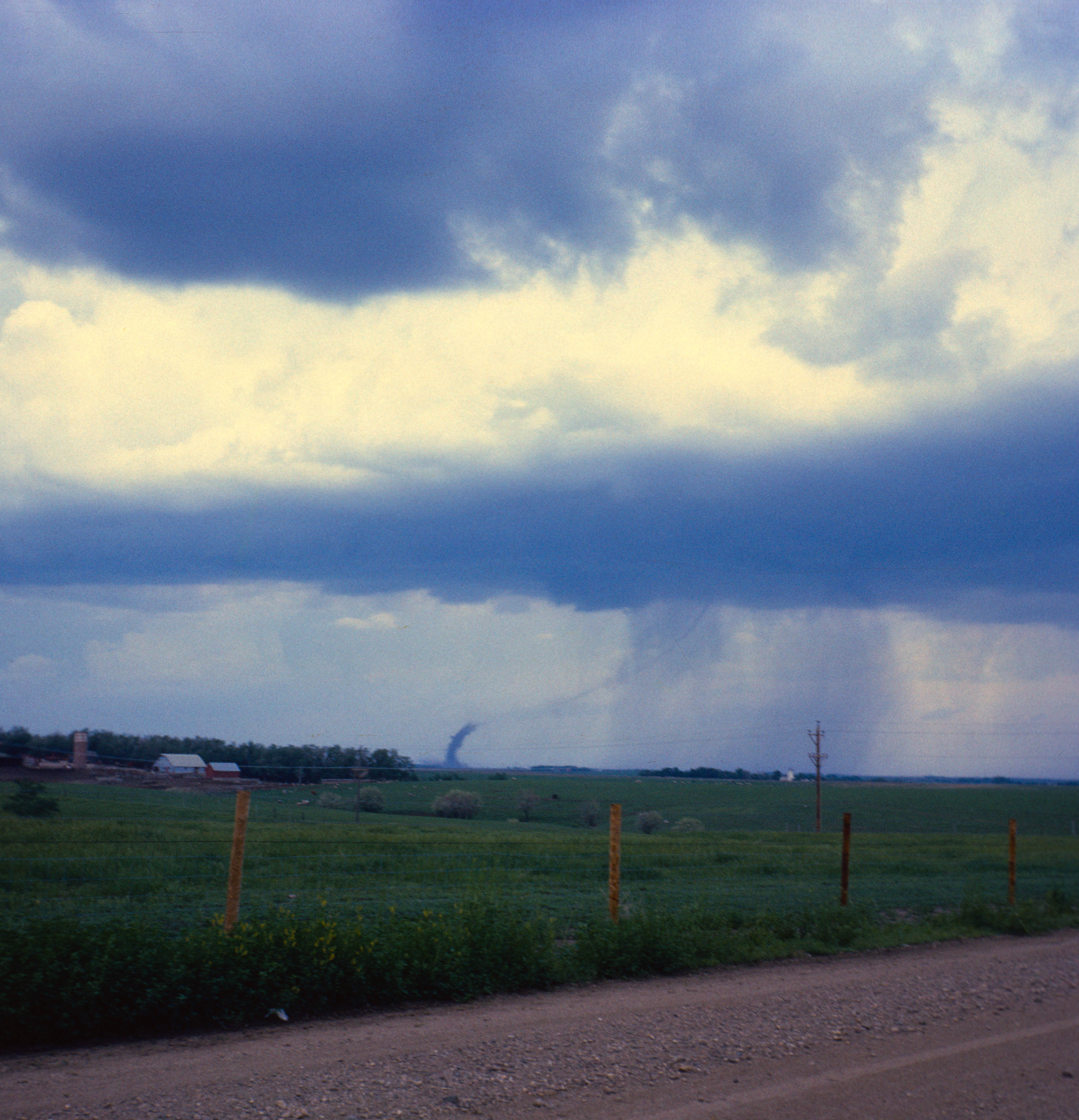
- Clockwise from top: An F4 tornado that would strike Goshen, Indiana on April 11, showing multiple funnels; F5 damage to a farmstead near Colome, South Dakota on May 8; Manitou Beach–Devils Lake, Michigan after an F4 tornado on April 11; A tornado near Wagner, South Dakota on July 1; Extreme damage to the Sunnyside subdivision in Dunlap, Indiana following an F4 on April 11; A radar image showing multiple hook echoes over the Minneapolis–Saint Paul metro area on May 6.
- Timespan: January 8–December 23, 1965
- Maximum rated tornado: F5 tornado: Colome, South Dakota on May 8
- Tornadoes in U.S.: 897
- Damage (U.S.): Unknown
- Fatalities (U.S.): 301
- Fatalities (worldwide): >301

This page documents the tornadoes and tornado outbreaks of 1965, primarily in the United States. Most tornadoes form in the U.S., although some events may take place internationally. Tornado statistics for older years like this often appear significantly lower than modern years due to fewer reports or confirmed tornadoes.

== Events ==
Fatal United States tornadoes in 1965
- Approximate touchdown location of killer tornadoes in 1965
Summary of tornadoes
- March 17 – North Carolina (2 deaths)
- April 10 – Arkansas (6 deaths)
- April 11 – Iowa (1 death)
- April 11 – Wisconsin (3 deaths)
- April 11 – Illinois (6 deaths)
- April 11 – Indiana (10 deaths)
- April 11 – Michigan (5 deaths)
- April 11 – Indiana (31 deaths)
- April 11 – Indiana (5 deaths)
- April 11 – Indiana, Michigan (23 deaths)
- April 11 – Michigan (1 death)
- April 11 – Indiana (36 deaths)
- April 11 – Indiana (25 deaths)
- April 11 – Michigan (21 deaths)
- April 11 – Indiana (28 deaths)
- April 11 – Indiana, Ohio (4 deaths)
- April 11 – Michigan (1 death)
- April 11 – Ohio, Michigan (18 deaths)
- April 11 – Ohio (13 deaths)
- April 11 – Ohio (3 deaths)
- April 11 – Ohio (4 deaths)
- April 11 – Ohio (18 deaths)
- April 11 – Ohio (4 deaths)
- April 15 – Tennessee (1 death)
- April 19 – Texas (1 death)
- May 6 – Minnesota (3 deaths)
- May 6 – Minnesota (1 death)
- May 6 – Minnesota (3 deaths)
- May 6 – Minnesota (6 deaths)
- May 8 – Nebraska (4 deaths)
- June 2 – Texas (4 deaths)
- June 4 – Texas (1 death)
- June 7 – South Dakota (1 death)
- June 7 – South Dakota (1 death)
- August 26 – Iowa (1 death)
- October 7 – North Carolina (1 death)
- November 12 – Illinois (2 deaths)
- November 16 – Ohio (2 deaths)
- November 26 – Kentucky (1 death)
Total fatalities: 301

1965 picked up where 1964 left off, becoming the most active year on record at the time. A total of 31 violent (F4 and F5) tornadoes also touched down, which was also a record, with 18 of the F4 tornadoes occurring during the 1965 Palm Sunday tornado outbreak.

=== United States yearly total ===
Confirmed tornadoes by Fujita rating
FU	F0	F1	F2	F3	F4	F5	Total
0	246	300	249	71	30	1	897

== January ==
There were 21 tornadoes confirmed in the United States in January.

== February ==
There were 32 tornadoes confirmed in the United States in February.

=== February 8–9 ===
FU	F0	F1	F2	F3	F4	F5
0	1	7	2	3	0	0

An outbreak sequence of 13 tornadoes struck the Mississippi Valley, Utah and the Midwest, injuring 10.

=== February 11 ===
FU	F0	F1	F2	F3	F4	F5
0	1	2	9	3	0	0

An outbreak of 15 tornadoes struck the Southeast, injuring 28.

=== February 23 ===
FU	F0	F1	F2	F3	F4	F5
0	0	2	1	1	0	0

An outbreak of four tornadoes struck South Florida between 10 a.m.–1 p.m. EST (15–18 UTC); the strongest was an F3 tornado that moved through the Fort Lauderdale metro area, injuring six people. Two other people were injured from the three other tornadoes, resulting in eight people being injured in total from the outbreak.

== March ==
There were 34 tornadoes confirmed in the United States in March.

=== March 16–18 ===
FU	F0	F1	F2	F3	F4	F5
0	5	8	5	5	1	0

A deadly and destructive outbreak of 24 tornadoes struck the Great Plains and Southeast, killing two and injuring 129.

== April ==
There were 123 tornadoes confirmed in the United States in April.

=== April 1 ===
A rare F1 tornado touched down in California.

=== April 7–9 ===
FU	F0	F1	F2	F3	F4	F5
0	1	6	9	2	0	0

Just before the Palm Sunday outbreak, an outbreak sequence of 19 tornadoes pummeled the Midwest, California, and the Great Lakes, injuring 16.

=== April 10–12 ===
FU	F0	F1	F2	F3	F4	F5
0	1	16	14	6	18	0

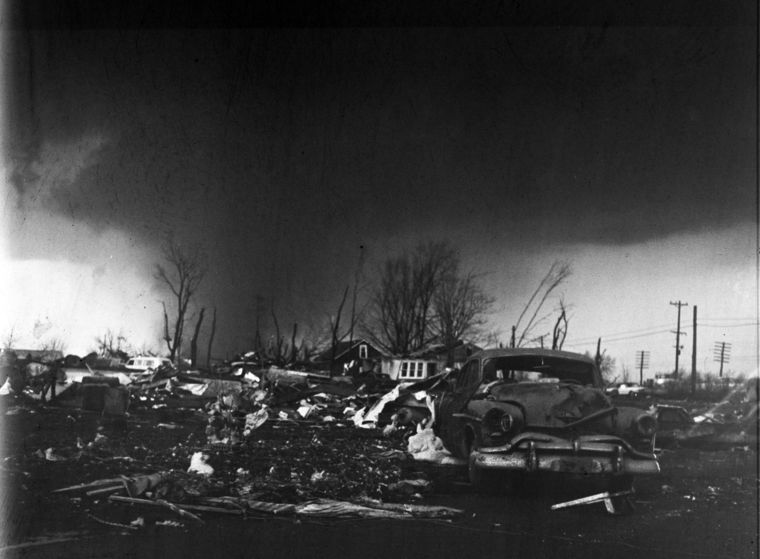
An F4 tornado striking Dunlap, Indiana at peak intensity. Damage in the foreground was from another F4 that struck the area earlier

An extremely destructive and deadly outbreak of 55 tornadoes caused major damage from the Southern Plains to the Midwest. The main outbreak was the Palm Sunday tornado outbreak, which started in the afternoon of April 11 and continued through the overnight hours of April 12. The second-biggest tornado outbreak on record at the time, this deadly series of 48 tornadoes inflicted a swath of destruction from Cedar County, Iowa, to Cuyahoga County, Ohio, and a swath 450 miles long (724 km) from Kent County, Michigan, to Montgomery County, Indiana. The outbreak lasted 16 hours and 35 minutes and is among the most intense outbreaks, in terms of number, strength, width, path, and length of tornadoes, ever recorded, including at least four "double/twin funnel" tornadoes. In addition, 18 tornadoes were rated F4, the second-largest number of violent tornadoes in one outbreak, second only to the 1974 Super Outbreak. At one point, all nine counties in the northern Indiana office's jurisdiction were under a tornado warning, marking the first occurrence of a "blanket tornado warning" in the U.S. Weather Bureau's history. However, as was the case in many other areas heavily affected, the outbreak began on Palm Sunday, an important holy day for most Christians, and many people were attending church services, which may explain why some tornado warnings were never received. As a result, 266 people were killed and 3,662 injured with 1,795 of them in Indiana alone. It was also the deadliest tornado outbreak in Indiana history, with 137 people killed.

=== April 14–15 ===
FU	F0	F1	F2	F3	F4	F5
0	3	3	6	4	0	0

Just two days after the deadly Palm Sunday outbreak, yet another deadly outbreak of 16 tornadoes struck the Great Plains and the Southeast, killing one and injuring 58.

=== April 18–19 ===
FU	F0	F1	F2	F3	F4	F5
0	0	0	1	2	0	0

Three destructive tornadoes struck Arkansas and Texas, killing one and injuring seven.

=== April 23–27 ===
FU	F0	F1	F2	F3	F4	F5
0	0	8	4	2	0	0

Tornado terror continued across the Midwest and Southeast with an outbreak of 14 tornadoes hitting the area, injuring three.

== May ==
273 tornadoes were confirmed in the United States in May.

=== May 5–8 ===
FU	F0	F1	F2	F3	F4	F5
0	20	20	22	6	8	1

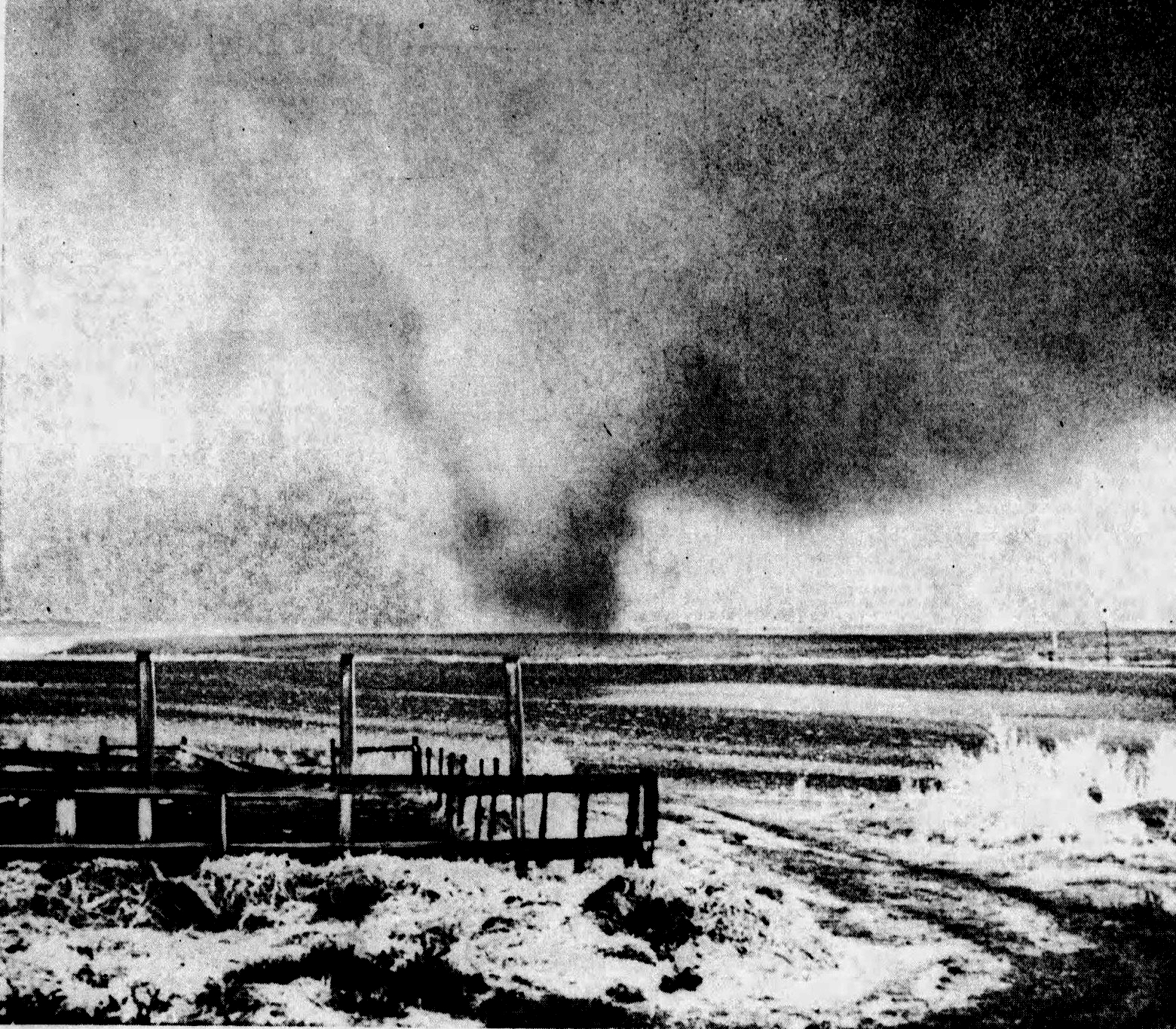
A large F4 tornado approaching Primrose, Nebraska on May 8

This major severe weather event affected much of the Central United States on May 5–8, 1965. For four consecutive days, tornado outbreaks produced at least three significant (F2+) tornadoes each day, and at least two violent (F4–F5) tornadoes on three of the four days. The strongest tornado of the year occurred on May 8, when an F5 tornado struck Gregory, South Dakota. The entire sequence generated 77 tornadoes, including 37 significant tornadoes with nine of them becoming violent. There were 17 fatalities and 772 injuries.

=== May 25–27 ===
FU	F0	F1	F2	F3	F4	F5
0	16	11	8	1	0	0

A large outbreak produced multiple strong tornadoes from the Great Plains to the Mississippi Valley. Areas near Pratt, Kansas were struck by an F3 tornado, just one of nine significant tornadoes during the event. There were 39 tornadoes confirmed and 48 people were injured, although there were no fatalities.

== June ==
There were 147 tornadoes confirmed in the United States in June.

=== June 2 ===
FU	F0	F1	F2	F3	F4	F5
0	0	1	0	0	1	0

An F1 tornado in Iowa was followed by a long-tracked, violent F4 tornado that killed four and injured 76 in Texas.

=== June 4 ===
FU	F0	F1	F2	F3	F4	F5
0	4	2	1	1	0	0

An outbreak of nine tornadoes struck the Midwest and Georgia, killing one and injuring three.

=== June 7 ===
FU	F0	F1	F2	F3	F4	F5
0	2	1	4	2	1	0

An intense, localized outbreak of 10 tornadoes hit South Dakota and Iowa, killing two.

== July ==
There were 85 tornadoes confirmed in the United States in July.

=== July 5 ===
FU	F0	F1	F2	F3	F4	F5
0	2	3	0	0	0	0

Two of the five weak tornadoes that touched down on this day occurred in California. There were no casualties.

== August ==
There were 61 tornadoes confirmed in the United States in August.

=== August 17 ===
FU	F0	F1	F2	F3	F4	F5
0	2	0	1	1	0	0

Four widely scattered tornadoes touched down with an F3 tornado in South Carolina injuring 46.

=== August 26–27 ===
FU	F0	F1	F2	F3	F4	F5
0	2	3	2	0	1	0

A small, but destructive outbreak of eight tornadoes hit areas from Kansas to Pennsylvania, killing one and injuring 19.

== September ==
There were 64 tornadoes confirmed in the United States in September.

=== September 3 ===
An isolated, brief, but strong F3 tornado injured 27 in Kansas.

=== September 8–12 (Hurricane Betsy) ===
FU	F0	F1	F2	F3	F4	F5
0	2	4	1	0	0	0

Hurricane Betsy produced seven isolated tornadoes throughout Florida and the Mississippi Valley. The strongest was an F2 tornado Mecklenburg County, North Carolina. There were no fatalities or injuries from the tornadoes.

=== September 8–9 (Elsewhere) ===
FU	F0	F1	F2	F3	F4	F5
0	1	3	2	0	0	0

An outbreak sequence of six tornadoes occurred from Colorado to New York, although there were no casualties.

=== September 14 ===
FU	F0	F1	F2	F3	F4	F5
0	0	1	5	1	0	0

An outbreak of seven tornadoes hit Illinois and Indiana, injuring 34.

=== September 20–23 ===
FU	F0	F1	F2	F3	F4	F5
0	8	8	6	4	0	0

An outbreak sequence of 26 tornadoes hit various regions of the country, injuring four. F0 tornadoes also touched down in Hawaii and Puerto Rico at the end of the outbreak.

== October ==
There were 16 tornadoes confirmed in the United States in October.

=== October 7–8 ===
FU	F0	F1	F2	F3	F4	F5
0	1	4	4	1	0	0

An outbreak of 10 tornadoes struck the Southeast and Great Lakes with an F3 tornado in North Carolina killing one and injuring four.

== November ==
There were 34 tornadoes confirmed in the United States in November.

=== November 10 ===
FU	F0	F1	F2	F3	F4	F5
0	1	0	1	0	0	0

Two rare tornadoes hit Washington and Oregon with no casualties being reported.

=== November 12 ===
FU	F0	F1	F2	F3	F4	F5
0	1	0	5	1	0	0

A deadly and destructive outbreak of seven tornadoes hit Illinois and Indiana, killing two and injuring 104.

=== November 16 ===
FU	F0	F1	F2	F3	F4	F5
0	0	1	5	1	0	0

Another outbreak of seven tornadoes hit Ohio and Pennsylvania, killing two and injuring 28.

=== November 25–27 ===
FU	F0	F1	F2	F3	F4	F5
0	0	6	6	6	0	0

A widespread outbreak of 18 tornadoes hit areas from the West Coast to the East Coast, killing one and injuring 26.

== December ==
There were 7 tornadoes confirmed in the United States in December.

=== December 11–12 ===
FU	F0	F1	F2	F3	F4	F5
0	0	4	2	0	0	0

One final outbreak of six tornadoes hit the Southeast, injuring six.

== See also ==
- Tornado
  - Tornadoes by year
  - Tornado records
  - Tornado climatology
  - Tornado myths
- List of tornado outbreaks
  - List of F5 and EF5 tornadoes
  - List of North American tornadoes and tornado outbreaks
  - List of 21st-century Canadian tornadoes and tornado outbreaks
  - List of European tornadoes and tornado outbreaks
  - List of tornadoes and tornado outbreaks in Asia
  - List of Southern Hemisphere tornadoes and tornado outbreaks
  - List of tornadoes striking downtown areas
  - List of tornadoes with confirmed satellite tornadoes
- Tornado intensity
  - Fujita scale
  - Enhanced Fujita scale
