= List of tornadoes in the 1965 Palm Sunday tornado outbreak =

On April 10–12, 1965, a devastating severe weather event, known as the Palm Sunday tornado outbreak, affected the Midwestern and Southeastern United States. The outbreak produced at least 55 confirmed tornadoes, 18 of which were retrospectively considered to be violent on the Fujita scale. Only the 1974 Super Outbreak featured a larger number of F4–F5 tornadoes. At least three of the 18 F4s recorded during the 1965 outbreak—near Dunlap, Indiana, Lebanon–Sheridan, Indiana, and Pittsfield–Strongsville, Ohio, respectively—may have reached F5-level intensity. The outbreak was one of three major tornado outbreaks to coincide with the Christian holy day Palm Sunday, the others having occurred in 1920 and 1994.

== Confirmed tornadoes ==
Confirmed tornadoes by Fujita rating
| FU | F0 | F1 | F2 | F3 | F4 | F5 | Total |
|---|---|---|---|---|---|---|---|
| 0 | 1 | 15 | 15 | 6 | 18 | 0 | 55 |

=== April 10 event ===
Confirmed tornadoes – Saturday, April 10, 1965 (Note: All dates are based on the local time zone where the tornado touched down; however, all times are in Coordinated Universal Time and dates are split at midnight CST/CDT for consistency.) (Note: Prior to 1994, only the average widths of tornado paths were officially listed.)
| F# | Location | County / Parish | State | Start Coord. | Time (UTC) | Path length | Max width | Summary |
|---|---|---|---|---|---|---|---|---|
| F0 | WNW of Iatan | Platte | MO | 39.48°N 95.03°W | 19:30–? | 2 miles (3.2 km) | 100 yards (91 m) | This tornado struck Bean Lake. Losses totaled $30. |
| F3 | ESE of Potter, KS to NNW of Agency, MO | Leavenworth (KS), Platte (MO), Buchanan (MO) | KS, MO | 39.42°N 95.12°W | 20:15–21:00 | 23.2 miles (37.3 km) | 200 yards (180 m) | This intense tornado family began near Lowemont in Leavenworth County, Kansas, and reformed near Bean Lake, Missouri. Losses totaled $25,000 in Leavenworth County. As it crossed into Missouri, the tornado family pushed a 25-foot-high (7.6 m) "wall of water" across Bean Lake. In Platte County the tornado family destroyed 25 trailers and unroofed the auditorium at Lakeview School. Communication wires and barns were also damaged near Weston. 11 people were injured: nine in Platte County and two in Buchanan County. Losses totaled $525,000, including $250,000 each in Platte and Buchanan counties. Along the path farms were extensively damaged, homes unroofed, and walls blown away. |
| F2 | NW of Osborn to SSW of Weatherby | DeKalb | MO | 39.78°N 94.42°W | 21:15–21:25 | 9.6 miles (15.4 km) | 50 yards (46 m) | This tornado destroyed or damaged outbuildings and barns. Eight farms were impacted and four homes were destroyed. Seven people were injured. Losses totaled $250,000. Tornado researcher Thomas P. Grazulis classified the tornado as an F3. |
| F2 | Edinburg to ENE of Tindall | Grundy | MO | 40.08°N 93.70°W | 22:45–23:15 | 10.3 miles (16.6 km) | 100 yards (91 m) | This tornado was associated with the same thunderstorm that produced the Bean Lake F3. Roofs in Edinburg were damaged. A church, trees, barns, and homes were damaged or destroyed. The tornado also wrapped a 2-short-ton (1.8 t; 1,800 kg) truck around a tree. One person was injured in Grundy County. Losses totaled $250,000. |
| F2 | SE of Jamesport to S of Trenton | Daviess, Grundy | MO | 39.95°N 93.78°W | 23:00–23:30 | 11.1 miles (17.9 km) | 50 yards (46 m) | This tornado impacted five farms. Homes and a few barns were unroofed, destroyed, or otherwise damaged. The tornado flipped a trailer in Grundy County, injuring a woman inside. Losses totaled $50,000. |
| F4 | Southeastern Conway | Faulkner | AR | 35.05°N 92.45°W | 00:26–00:35 | 4.7 miles (7.6 km) | 200 yards (180 m) | 6 deaths – This violent tornado extensively damaged or destroyed 185 homes in Conway, a block-long swath of which sustained F4-level damage. 200 injuries occurred, of which 100 required hospitalization. Losses totaled $25 million. |
| F1 | NW of La Tour | Cass | MO | 38.65°N 94.12°W | 01:30–? | 0.2 miles (0.32 km) | 50 yards (46 m) | Three farms were damaged. Losses totaled $25,000. |

=== April 11 event ===
Confirmed tornadoes – Sunday, April 11, 1965
| F# | Location | County / Parish | State | Start Coord. | Time (UTC) | Path length | Max width | Summary |
|---|---|---|---|---|---|---|---|---|
| F2 | SSW of Keefeton | Muskogee | OK | 35.58°N 95.35°W | 09:30–? | 0.1 miles (0.16 km) | 10 yards (9.1 m) | This brief, strong tornado destroyed a 30-by-75-foot (9.1 by 22.9 m) barn. With a "big roar" the tornado moved a sheet-metal garage 2 feet (0.61 m) off its foundation and spread debris over a wide area. The tornado also tore sheet-metal roofing from the barn into fragments, parts of which were found hanging in trees. Losses totaled $2,500. Grazulis did not list the tornado as an F2 or stronger. |
| F4 | SSW of Lowden, IA to W of Dubuque, IA | Cedar (IA), Jones (IA), Clinton (IA), Jackson (IA), Dubuque (IA) | IA | 41.85°N 90.93°W | 18:55–? | 91.12 miles (146.64 km) | 200 yards (180 m) | 1 death – This violent tornado may have first begun just east of Tipton. It went on to strike 25 farms, one of which it leveled. Fragments of the farmhouse were found 1 mile (1.6 km) away. The tornado passed just a few miles west of the heavily populated town of Dubuque. A man near Lowden died of severe injuries a month after the tornado. Three other people sustained nonlethal injuries. Damages amounted to at least $500,000 and are officially listed as $5 million. Some sources state that the tornado stayed the totality of its lifetime in Iowa, traveling 40 miles (64 km) through Cedar, Clinton, and Jackson counties, dissipating near Springbrook. |
| F1 | S of Fredericksburg to NNW of Elon | Chickasaw, Fayette, Winneshiek, Allamakee | IA | 42.93°N 92.20°W | 19:15–? | 49.9 miles (80.3 km) | 300 yards (270 m) | This long-lived, intermittent tornado caused considerable damage near Ossian and skipped past Waukon. The tornado also passed through Alpha and Moneek. Losses totaled $250,000. |
| F1 | NW of Winslow, IL to N of Albion, WI | Stephenson (IL), Green (WI), Rock (WI), Dane (WI) | IL, WI | 42.50°N 89.80°W | 20:00–21:00 | 27.1 miles (43.6 km) | 167 yards (153 m) | This tornado family may have first uprooted a grove of 15 trees near Stockton, Illinois, and left debris beside the Illinois Central Railroad between Warren and Lena. Confirmable damage began near Winslow, crossed into Wisconsin, and worsened in severity. The tornado family destroyed or damaged 400 cars, 55 businesses, and 65 homes in northwestern Monroe. A motel was unroofed just north of town as well. The tornado family also destroyed barns and other structures on 57 farms. Homes and trailers were unroofed, destroyed, or shorn of walls near Evansville. The tornado family also impacted Albany. At least 40 people—possibly 47—were injured and losses totaled $5 million. Grazulis classified the tornado family as an F2 and split the event into two tornadoes. |
| F2 | SSW of Aztalan to Eastern Watertown | Jefferson | WI | 43.03°N 88.88°W | 20:30–21:30 | 14.5 miles (23.3 km) | 1,320 yards (1,210 m) | 3 deaths – This large tornado began near Jefferson and rapidly widened to 3/4 mile (1.2 km) across. As it neared Wisconsin Highway 30—presently Interstate 94—the tornado "practically leveled" a forest. Shortly thereafter, the tornado struck the community of Pipersville; nearby, it tossed two cars off Wisconsin Highway 16 (then part of U.S. Route 16), killing three of their occupants. The tornado also destroyed buildings on 20 farms. At least 28 people (possibly 35) were injured and losses totaled $2.5 million. Grazulis classified the tornado as a near-F4. |
| F1 | ESE of Mount Sterling to WNW of Bosstown | Crawford | WI | 43.30°N 90.90°W | 20:45–? | 13.3 miles (21.4 km) | 10 yards (9.1 m) | This tornado destroyed at least one barn near Soldiers Grove. The tornado also struck Gays Mills. Losses totaled $25,000. Grazulis classified the tornado as an F2. |
| F4 | Lakewood to Island Lake | McHenry, Lake | IL | 42.22°N 88.38°W | 21:20–21:42 | 9.1 miles (14.6 km) | 400 yards (370 m) | 6 deaths – See section on this tornado – 75 people were injured and losses totaled $1.5 million. |
| F2 | NW of Third Lake to W of Gurnee | Lake | IL | 42.38°N 88.02°W | 21:50–? | 4.5 miles (7.2 km) | 200 yards (180 m) | Related to the previous event, this tornado began as a waterspout over Druce Lake. Continuing to the east, the tornado damaged more than 12 homes, a few of which were unroofed; large, fallen trees damaged one or more of the homes as well. The tornado then traversed 2 miles (3.2 km) of wooded and marshy wilderness before striking an orchard and destroying a farm. Further along, some damage also occurred to garages and sheds before the tornado apparently dissipated. Losses totaled $250,000. |
| F1 | Southern Williams Bay to Como | Walworth | WI | 42.57°N 88.55°W | 21:50–? | 1.9 miles (3.1 km) | 50 yards (46 m) | This brief, small tornado may have begun at 4:34 p.m. CDT (21:34 UTC) and traveled 5 miles (8.0 km) before dissipating. It passed through the south side of Williams Bay and dissipated in Como. The tornado ripped the roofs off a few homes and a business but mostly produced minor damage to vegetation. One other home sustained severe damage. Losses totaled $250,000. Grazulis classified the tornado as a near-F4. |
| F1 | ESE of Lake Lorraine | Walworth | WI | 42.72°N 88.70°W | 21:55–? | 1 mile (1.6 km) | 10 yards (9.1 m) | This short-lived tornado flattened a barn near Richmond. Losses totaled $25,000. Grazulis classified the tornado as an F2. Storm Data listed the touchdown as having occurred 2.5 miles (4.0 km) east of East Troy. |
| F2 | Geneva | Kane | IL | 41.88°N 88.30°W | 22:00–? | 0.3 miles (0.48 km) | 150 yards (140 m) | This tornado, first sighted from DuPage Airport, produced a 300-to-500-foot-wide (91 to 152 m) swath of damage. After crossing Illinois Route 38, the tornado damaged at least 12 homes, some of which lost their walls and roofs. The NWS would later upgrade the tornado to an EF2 rating with wind-speeds of 115 MPH. Losses totaled $250,000. |
| F1 | Beach Park to Southern Zion | Lake | IL | 42.43°N 87.83°W | 22:04–? | 0.5 miles (0.80 km) | 250 yards (230 m) | This tornado occurred in association with the Crystal Lake–Gurnee supercell. A narrow funnel cloud briefly touched down and damaged two homes. Airplanes flipped at Waukegan National Airport—then called Waukegan Memorial Airport—and strong winds of 82 mph (132 km/h) damaged hangars. However, a downburst rather than the tornado may have caused the damage at the airport. Losses totaled $250,000. |
| F1 | SSW of Tunnel City | Monroe | WI | 43.97°N 90.58°W | 22:14–? | 2 miles (3.2 km) | 50 yards (46 m) | This tornado occurred west of Tomah. It destroyed several outbuildings on a farm, including barns and sheds. Losses totaled $25,000. Grazulis classified the tornado as an F2. |
| F3 | S of Hamlet to W of Dunlap | Starke, Marshall, St. Joseph, Elkhart | IN | 41.35°N 86.58°W | 22:45–? | 35.6 miles (57.3 km) | 250 yards (230 m) | 10 deaths – This was the first of four destructive tornadoes to affect Elkhart County, Indiana, and was the first member of a long-lived, destructive tornado family. As the narrow but well-defined tornado crossed Koontz Lake, it produced severe destruction and destroyed or damaged 100 cottages. Near La Paz, an Indiana state trooper on U.S. Route 31 photographed the tornado: a vivid white funnel, silhouetted by sunlight, against a backdrop of darkness. Outside La Paz, the tornado destroyed six homes and a church, as well as a high school being built then. The tornado then struck Wyatt, destroying 20 more homes before dissipating. 82 people were injured and losses totaled $75.250 million. Grazulis classified the tornado as an F4. |
| F4 | NW of Lamont to NNE of Courtland Township | Ottawa, Kent | MI | 43.02°N 85.92°W | 22:54–? | 20.6 miles (33.2 km) | 300 yards (270 m) | 5 deaths — Beginning over Ottawa County, this tornado destroyed only a few homes before entering Kent County. It then produced much more severe damage through the Comstock Park area, north of Grand Rapids, with 224 homes destroyed or damaged. The tornado also tracked through Rockford before dissipating. 142 people were injured and losses totaled $2.525 million. |
| F3 | N of Hebron to ENE of South Center | Porter, LaPorte | IN | 41.35°N 87.20°W | 23:10–? | 33.1 miles (53.3 km) | 10 yards (9.1 m) | This was the first member of a long-lived, deadly tornado family that trailed the Koontz Lake–Wyatt storm. The tornado destroyed several homes and barns; six of the homes sustained borderline-F4-level damage. Significant damage occurred southwest of Wanatah and south of Kingsford Heights, but the path was quite narrow as it hit farmland. The tornado passed through South Wanatah as well. Losses totaled $50 million. Grazulis listed four injuries. |
| F4 | SW of Wakarusa to NW of Middlebury | St. Joseph, Elkhart | IN | 41.52°N 86.07°W | 23:15–? | 21.2 miles (34.1 km) | 33 yards (30 m) | 31 deaths – See section on this tornado – 252 people were injured and losses were unknown. Grazulis listed 14 deaths and 200 injuries. |
| F4 | S of Middlebury to SW of Greenfield Mills | Elkhart, LaGrange | IN | 41.62°N 85.70°W | 23:40–? | 21.6 miles (34.8 km) | 177 yards (162 m) | 5 deaths – This tornado, which formed while the preceding was still ongoing, may have begun as a waterspout over the Goshen Dam Pond, but it first produced damage farther afield. The tornado later produced "devastating" damage to the Rainbow Lake area, where 12 homes sustained high-end F4 damage and foundations were swept clean. The tornado also passed through Ontario and dissipated near Brighton. 41 people were injured and losses totaled $2.750 million. Unofficial estimates of the death toll vary, with Grazulis listing 19 deaths, 17 of which occurred south of Shipshewana. |
| F4 | Orland, IN to SSE of West Sumpter, MI (1st tornado) | Steuben (IN), Branch (MI), Hillsdale (MI), Lenawee (MI), Monroe (MI), Washtenaw (MI) | IN, MI | 41.73°N 85.17°W | 00:00–? | 90.3 miles (145.3 km) | 1,760 yards (1,610 m) | 23 deaths – See section on this tornado – 294 people were injured. |
| F1 | SE of Burnips to ENE of Middleville | Allegan, Barry | MI | 42.72°N 85.83°W | 00:05–? | 19.5 miles (31.4 km) | 200 yards (180 m) | 1 death — This tornado or a related one may have begun as far southwest as Saugatuck, leaving debris in the city and causing damage north of Hamilton. Officially, damage began in the Burnips area and continued eastward through Dorr, leaving a trailer and five homes destroyed with 25 other "dwellings" damaged. One woman died in the trailer, and a few people were hospitalized due to severe injuries. Some reports indicated twin tornadoes along the path. Nine people were injured and losses totaled $500,000. Grazulis classified the tornado as an F2. |
| F4 | ENE of South Raub to NW of Middlefork | Tippecanoe, Clinton | IN | 40.33°N 86.83°W | 00:07–? | 21.8 miles (35.1 km) | 500 yards (460 m) | This was the first member of a fast-moving tornado family that tracked 274 mi (441 km) into Ohio, producing five or more violent tornadoes, and ended near Lake Erie. The tornado destroyed or damaged several homes and other buildings, but mostly at F2–F3 intensity. Some homes sustained F4-level damage near Cambria, in Mulberry, and in Moran. 44 people were injured and losses totaled $2 million. |
| F4 | NW of Woodland to ENE of Scott | St. Joseph, Elkhart, LaGrange | IN | 41.58°N 86.02°W | 00:10–? | 37 miles (60 km) | 333 yards (304 m) | 36 deaths – See section on this tornado – Rated F5 by some authorities. 321 people were injured and losses were unknown. |
| F4 | SE of Middlefork to SE of Arcana | Clinton, Howard, Grant | IN | 40.40°N 86.38°W | 00:20–? | 48 miles (77 km) | 880 yards (800 m) | 25 deaths – See section on this tornado – 835 people were injured and losses totaled $500.025 million. |
| F3 | W of Cooper Township to NE of Augusta | Kalamazoo | MI | 42.37°N 85.60°W | 00:30–? | 14.2 miles (22.9 km) | 150 yards (140 m) | A strong tornado moved east across the outskirts of Kalamazoo, destroying or damaging 26 homes and other structures. The tornado passed through Southern Richland. 17 people were injured and losses totaled $250,000. |
| F3 | Hastings to NNE of Woodbury | Barry, Eaton | MI | 42.65°N 85.30°W | 00:40–? | 14.1 miles (22.7 km) | 10 yards (9.1 m) | This tornado struck the north side of Hastings and continued to near Woodland, destroying several barns and garages. 15 homes sustained damage as well. Five people were injured and losses totaled $250,000. Grazulis classified the tornado as an F2. |
| F4 | Kinderhook to SSE of West Sumpter (2nd tornado) | Branch, Hillsdale, Lenawee, Monroe, Washtenaw | MI | 41.80°N 85.00°W | 00:40–? | 80.5 miles (129.6 km) | 10 yards (9.1 m) | 21 deaths — See section on this tornado – 293 people were injured. |
| F4 | S of Crawfordsville to Southern Arcadia | Montgomery, Boone, Hamilton | IN | 40.02°N 86.87°W | 00:50–? | 45.7 miles (73.5 km) | 1,667 yards (1,524 m) | 28 deaths — An extremely large and violent tornado, up to 1 mile (1.6 km) wide, swept away homes as it passed just northwest and north of Lebanon. One person died in a destroyed home east of Crawfordsville, but 21 of the 28 deaths occurred in two areas near Lebanon and Sheridan. The tornado lofted two cars more than 100 yards (91 m), killing four occupants. In all, the tornado destroyed about 80 homes and injured 123 people. Losses totaled $75 million. A 1999 technical memorandum lists the tornado as an F5, though it is officially F4. |
| F4 | ESE of Roll, IN to ESE of Venedocia, OH | Blackford (IN), Wells (IN), Adams (IN), Mercer (OH), Van Wert (OH) | IN, OH | 40.55°N 85.38°W | 01:10–? | 52.5 miles (84.5 km) | 10 yards (9.1 m) | 4 deaths — As the Greentown–Marion tornado dissipated, this tornado formed near Roll. On its long track across eastern Indiana and western Ohio, the tornado produced violent damage to three areas: in Keystone, with two deaths; in Linn Grove, with a few other deaths; and south of Willshire, Ohio, with two final deaths. Areas near Willshire sustained the most severe damage, with 10 homes destroyed and five flattened. In Berne, Indiana, the tornado cut a path through the northern part of the small city, damaging homes and businesses including a bowling alley, a grocery store, and a lumber yard before the supercell crossed into Ohio. Residents reported two tornadoes near Berne. 125 people were injured and losses totaled $52.750 million. |
| F4 | W of Dewitt to ENE of Laingsburg | Clinton, Shiawassee | MI | 42.85°N 84.65°W | 01:15–? | 21 miles (34 km) | 100 yards (91 m) | 1 death — This tornado killed one person in an obliterated home and destroyed about 10 other homes. Eight people were injured and losses totaled $500,000. |
| F2 | SW of Crystal to Southern Alma | Montcalm, Gratiot | MI | 43.25°N 84.93°W | 01:25–? | 15.1 miles (24.3 km) | 440 yards (400 m) | This tornado first destroyed some homes and barns in Crystal. It then hit many rural farms in its path, leveling farm buildings and killing or injuring livestock. The tornado passed through Sumner en route to Alma. One home near Alma was nearly flattened, and five other homes and barns were destroyed nearby. One person was injured and losses totaled $500,000. Grazulis classified the tornado as an F3. |
| F2 | E of Alma (1st tornado) | Gratiot | MI | 43.38°N 84.62°W | 01:30–? | 0.1 miles (0.16 km) | 50 yards (46 m) | This was one of four tornadoes to strike near Alma. The damage path may have begun near Vestaburg. The tornado caused damage to several buildings, including the library, which had its roof torn off. The tornado destroyed a telephone repair facility as well. Losses totaled $25,000. Grazulis listed a skipping path length of 10 miles (16 km). |
| F2 | E of Alma (2nd tornado) | Gratiot | MI | 43.38°N 84.62°W | 01:30–? | 0.5 miles (0.80 km) | 50 yards (46 m) | Losses totaled $25,000. Grazulis did not list the tornado as an F2 or stronger. |
| F2 | S of St. Louis | Gratiot | MI | 43.37°N 84.60°W | 01:30–? | 1 mile (1.6 km) | 50 yards (46 m) | Losses totaled $25,000. Grazulis did not list the tornado as an F2 or stronger. |
| F2 | SSE of Bay City | Bay | MI | 43.55°N 83.87°W | 01:50–? | 9.9 miles (15.9 km) | 10 yards (9.1 m) | This tornado tore the roofs off homes and an automobile dealership. Trailers and barns were destroyed as well. Two people were injured and losses totaled $250,000. |
| F2 | ESE of Quanicassee to WSW of Unionville | Tuscola | MI | 43.57°N 83.63°W | 02:00–? | 9 miles (14 km) | 10 yards (9.1 m) | This tornado damaged a fire station, which had its roof ripped off, and a lumberyard. The tornado also leveled barns. Downburst winds may have damaged the fire station in Unionville. Losses totaled $250,000. |
| F4 | N of Elida to WNW of Houcktown | Allen, Hancock | OH | 40.8°N 84.20°W | 02:30–? | 32.5 miles (52.3 km) | 400 yards (370 m) | 13 deaths — This tornado destroyed numerous homes and farms along the track, with severe damage in many spots. Two deaths occurred west of Cairo, but most of the deaths, five in all, took place south of Bluffton. 104 people were injured and losses totaled $2.750 million. |
| F4 | Northern Toledo, OH to Lost Peninsula, MI | Lucas (OH), Monroe (MI) | OH, MI | 41.67°N 83.60°W | 02:30–? | 5.6 miles (9.0 km) | 200 yards (180 m) | 18 deaths – A tornado struck North Toledo with high-end F4 intensity. Five people were killed when a tornado flipped over a bus on the Detroit-Toledo Expressway (today's Interstate 75). About 50 homes in the northern suburbs of Toledo were completely destroyed, several of which were completely swept away. The tornado also hurled cars and boats against and onto buildings. A paint factory and department store were destroyed as well. Two people were killed on the Lost Peninsula in Michigan. There were reports of "glowing" twin funnels during the event—perhaps related to static electricity. 236 people were injured and losses totaled $27.5 million. |
| F4 | Fort Loramie to NW of Maplewood | Shelby | OH | 40.35°N 84.38°W | 03:00–? | 18.4 miles (29.6 km) | 300 yards (270 m) | 3 deaths — This tornado mostly affected rural areas but almost struck the communities of Anna, Swanders, and Maplewood. The tornado struck a train of 68 railcars near Swanders, lifting 53 from the railroad tracks. The tornado destroyed almost 25 homes, severely damaged 20 others, and lofted a car 200 yards (180 m). 50 people were injured and losses totaled $2.5 million. A satellite tornado may have formed just north of the main funnel and flipped a trailer, causing two injuries. |
| F3 | SE of Tiffin to ESE of Omar | Seneca | OH | 41.07°N 83.13°W | 03:15–? | 15 miles (24 km) | 300 yards (270 m) | 4 deaths — This tornado may have first touched down south of Alvada, but is first officially documented southeast of Tiffin. It then struck the rural community of Rockaway, leveling four homes and severely damaging three, with one death. 30 people were injured and losses totaled $250,000. Estimates of the death toll vary, with some sources listing only one death. Grazulis classified the tornado as an F4. |
| F4 | WSW of Pittsfield to Northern Strongsville | Lorain, Cuyahoga | OH | 41.23°N 82.25°W | 04:05–? | 22 miles (35 km) | 400 yards (370 m) | 18 deaths – See section on this tornado – Rated F5 by some authorities. 200 people were injured and losses totaled $50 million. |
| F1 | Southern Eaton | Preble | OH | 39.73°N 84.63°W | 04:15–? | 0.1 miles (0.16 km) | 10 yards (9.1 m) | A brief tornado uplifted a roof from a building at a livestock producer. Losses totaled $25,000. |
| F1 | WSW of Brunswick to ENE of Hinckley | Medina | OH | 41.23°N 81.87°W | 04:30–? | 8.2 miles (13.2 km) | 200 yards (180 m) | This tornado hit the town of Brunswick, destroying a home and badly damaging many others. Six people were injured and losses totaled $250,000. The tornado may have ended north of Richfield. Grazulis classified the tornado as an F3 with a path ending north of Richfield in Summit County. |
| F2 | NNW of Magnetic Springs to N of Fulton | Union, Delaware, Morrow | OH | 40.37°N 83.27°W | 04:30–? | 22.2 miles (35.7 km) | 400 yards (370 m) | 4 deaths — This tornado struck the communities of Radnor and Westfield, causing three deaths in the former, and destroyed nearly 25 homes along its path. The tornado injured 62 people; 20 or more of the injured were in Westfield. Losses totaled $5.025 million. One of the official deaths may have been from a heart attack and thus only indirectly related to the tornado. Grazulis classified the tornado as an F3. |
| F1 | SSE of Cedarville | Greene | OH | 39.73°N 83.80°W | 04:50–? | 0.1 miles (0.16 km) | 10 yards (9.1 m) | This weak and brief tornado produced minimal damage to trees and roofs. Losses totaled $25,000. |

=== April 12 event ===
Confirmed tornadoes – Monday, April 12, 1965
| F# | Location | County / Parish | State | Start Coord. | Time (UTC) | Path length | Max width | Summary |
|---|---|---|---|---|---|---|---|---|
| F1 | WNW of South Bloomfield to N of Somerset | Pickaway, Fairfield, Perry | OH | 39.73°N 83.03°W | 05:30–? | 38.4 miles (61.8 km) | 300 yards (270 m) | This tornado initially produced negligible damage, but then leveled many farm buildings after passing the Scioto River. The tornado caused most of its damage to farms north of Lancaster in an 8-mile-long (13 km) swath. The tornado then struck and destroyed 12 trailers in Dumontville before dissipating. 13 people were injured and losses totaled $750,000. Grazulis classified the tornado as an F2. |
| F1 | Cadiz | Harrison | OH | 40.27°N 81.00°W | 06:01–? | 0.1 miles (0.16 km) | 10 yards (9.1 m) | A brief tornado partially destroyed the roofs of two buildings and left other minor damage. One person was injured and losses totaled $2,500. |
| F1 | W of Grassdale | Bartow | GA | 34.27°N 84.80°W | 09:50–? | 2 miles (3.2 km) | 50 yards (46 m) | A brief tornado snapped or uprooted trees. Losses totaled $2,500. |
| F2 | ENE of Kegley | Mercer | WV | 37.40°N 81.10°W | 11:30–? | 0.1 miles (0.16 km) | 10 yards (9.1 m) | A short-lived tornado removed a metal garage roof. Losses totaled $2,500. Grazulis did not list the tornado as an F2 or stronger. |

== See also ==
- Lists of tornadoes and tornado outbreaks
  - List of North American tornadoes and tornado outbreaks
- Tornado outbreak of April 2–3, 1956 – Produced a powerful F5 tornado family in Michigan
- 1920 Palm Sunday tornado outbreak – Generated deadly F4 tornadoes in the Great Lakes region
- 1994 Palm Sunday tornado outbreak – Yielded long-tracked, intense tornadoes from Alabama to the Carolinas
- 1974 Super Outbreak – Associated with numerous violent tornadoes across much of Indiana and Greater Cincinnati

== Sources ==
- Bontranger, Timothy E. (2005). The Palm Sunday Tornado. Instantpublisher.com. ISBN 978-1591969648.
- Cherry, Dan (2002). Night of the Wind: The Palm Sunday Tornado of April 11, 1965 (Report). Adrian, Michigan: Lenawee County Historical Society.
- Clem, Dale (1997). Winds of fury, circles of grace: life after the Palm Sunday tornadoes. Nashville, Tennessee: Abingdon Press. ISBN 0-687-01795-5.
- E. S. Epstein; G. A. Petersen; H. Lieb; J. Davies; V. Oliver; J. Purdom; P. Dales (December 1974). "Production". The Widespread Tornado Outbreak of April 3-4, 1974: A Report to the Administrator (PDF). NWS Service Assessments (Report). Natural Disaster Survey Report. Rockville, Maryland: United States Department of Commerce. p. 18. "...warning offices issued 'blanket' warnings because they knew severe storms were in the area, although they did not know the exact location, extent, and movement of the storms."
- Fujita, T. T.; Bradbury, D. L.; Thullenar, C. L. (January 1970). "Palm Sunday tornadoes of April 11, 1965". Monthly Weather Review. 98 (1): 30–1. Bibcode:1970MWRv...98...29F. doi:10.1175/1520-0493(1970)098<0029:PSTOA>2.3.CO;2.
- Fujita, T. Theodore (February 1971). Proposed Characterization of Tornadoes and Hurricanes by Area and Intensity. Texas Tech University Southwest Collection/Special Collections Library (Report). Satellite and Mesometeorology Research Project Research Paper No. 91. hdl:10605/261875.
- Grazulis, Thomas P. (July 1993). Significant Tornadoes 1680–1991: A Chronology and Analysis of Events. St. Johnsbury, Vermont: The Tornado Project of Environmental Films. ISBN 1-879362-03-1.
- Grazulis, Thomas P. (2001a). The Tornado: Nature's Ultimate Windstorm. Norman: University of Oklahoma Press. ISBN 978-0-8061-3538-0.
- Grazulis, Thomas P. (2001b). F5-F6 Tornadoes. St. Johnsbury, Vermont: The Tornado Project of Environmental Films.
- P. H. Kutschenreuter; R. Fox (1965). "Annex 2". Report of Palm Sunday tornadoes of 1965 (PDF). NWS Service Assessments (Report). Natural Disaster Survey Report. Washington, D.C.: National Weather Service. p. 1.
- National Weather Service (April 1965). "Storm Data and Unusual Weather Phenomena". Storm Data. 7 (4). Asheville, North Carolina: National Climatic Data Center.
- National Weather Service (April 1965). Storm Data Publication (Report). National Centers for Environmental Information – via Storm Events Database.
- Neal, Lott; Sam McCown; Tom Ross (August 2000) [1999]. 1998-1999 Tornadoes and a Long-Term U.S. Tornado Climatology (PDF) (Technical report). National Climatic Data Center Technical Report. Asheville, North Carolina: National Climatic Data Center. 99-02.
- King, Marshall (April 10, 2005). "One for the books". Elkhart Truth. Elkhart, Indiana.
- Pickenpaugh, Roger (2003). The Night of the Wicked Winds: the 1965 Palm Sunday tornadoes in Ohio. Baltimore, Maryland: Gateway Press. ISBN 0-9709059-3-9.
- Wagler, David (1966). The Mighty Whirlwind. Aylmer, Ontario: Pathway Publishing Corporation. LCCN 67112646.
