= Dumontville, Ohio =

Unincorporated community in Ohio, U.S.

Coordinates: 39°46′38″N 82°36′59″W

Dumontville is an unincorporated community in Fairfield County, in the U.S. state of Ohio.

== History ==
A post office called Dumontville was established in 1837, and remained in operation until 1903. The community was named for James Dumont, a first settler.
