= Storm Data =

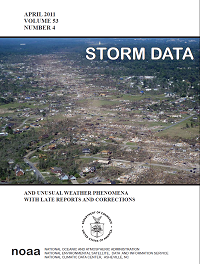
- Discipline: Meteorology & climatology
- Language: English

Publication details
- History: 1959–present
- Publisher: NOAA National Climatic Data Center (United States)
- Frequency: Monthly
- Open access: Yes

Standard abbreviations
- ISO 4: Storm Data

Indexing
- ISSN: 0039-1972
- OCLC no.: 2468803

Links
- Journal homepage

Storm Data and Unusual Weather Phenomena (SD) is a monthly NOAA publication with comprehensive listings and detailed summaries of severe weather occurrences in the United States. Included is information on tornadoes, high wind events, hail, lightning, floods and flash floods, tropical cyclones (hurricanes), ice storms, snow, extreme temperatures such as heat waves and cold waves, droughts, and wildfires. Photographs of weather and attendant damage are used as much as possible. Maps of significant weather are also included.

== Background ==
Storm Data was started by the Weather Bureau, predecessor to the National Weather Service (NWS), in 1959. It is updated continuously on a monthly basis with a lag of a few months from the present. This delay is because the data is compiled and verified by local NWS offices and sent to the National Centers for Environmental Information (NCEI) which does further refinements and publishes Storm Data in reports covering the entire country. The local NWS offices initially gather the data, starting when a severe weather event unfolds and continuing until sufficient information is obtained. The initial data, considered preliminary, is sent in real-time to the Storm Prediction Center (SPC) which does limited quality control as new information becomes available and enters it into its (and its predecessor the National Severe Storms Forecast Center) Storm Events Database that begins in 1950. Original sources of the data include but are not limited to local law enforcement, local, state, and federal emergency management, storm spotter and storm chaser reports, the news media, insurance industry data, NWS damage surveys, and reports from the general public.

SPC is interested in tornado, convective wind, and hail data. The tornado portion of the database, the National Tornado Database, is one of three authoritative tornado databases. Another is the DAPPL (short for Damage Area Per Path Length) database that was headed by Ted Fujita at the University of Chicago and concerns the period from 1916 to 1992. The most comprehensive historical database was compiled by Tom Grazulis of the Tornado Project and exhaustively covers known significant tornadoes for the period from 1680 to 1995. Both the Storms Event Database and Storm Data are official records. The database and the publication are from the same source but the database is more easily searchable. Delayed reports are added to both the database as well as the publication as new information becomes available in the "Late Reports and Corrections" section.

Until 2012 Storm Data was available to anyone but for a charge. Now it is a free publication downloadable from the NCEI website.

== Format ==
Storm Data publishes chronological tabulations, narratives, and images for a calendar month, as well as updates to previous publications. The format has undergone various changes throughout publication history but consists of reports separated by state subdivided by regions within a state. Type of occurrence, location (including municipality and county as well as estimated latitude and longitude), date and time, magnitude of event (i.e. wind speed, Fujita scale rating, Saffir-Simpson Hurricane Scale rating, hail size, storm surge or river crest height, etc.), fatalities and injuries, monetary damages of property and agricultural crops, and descriptions are included. For tornadoes, Fujita scale or Enhanced Fujita scale rating is included as well as path length in miles and path width in yards. Average path width is listed from 1950 to 1994 and maximum path width is listed from 1995 to present. For fatalities, demographic information such as age and sex are gathered when possible as is the type of location (frame house, mobile home, apartment, outside, vehicle, church, school or other public building, etc.) and/or activity (boating, camping, playing sports, golfing, swimming, bathing, telephoning, construction work, etc.) at time of death.

Significant waterspouts, funnel cloud sightings, dense fog, dense smoke, dust storms, dust devils, debris flows (such as landslides), avalanches, tsunami and other surf and tide events, volcanic ash, as well as other extreme or unusual weather may also be listed. Annual summaries of selected event types are listed in the December issue for older years and in a separate issue for recent years.

== See also ==
- Monthly Weather Review (MWR) (originally published by NOAA and predecessor agencies, it's now a peer-reviewed AMS journal)
