= List of tornado events by year =

The following is a list of tornado events by year.

== Number of tornadoes in United States by year and intensity ==
United States tornadoes by year
Year	Number of tornadoes	FU/EFU	F0/EF0	F1/EF1	F2/EF2	F3/EF3	F4/EF4	F5/EF5
1925	100	1	0	3	68	19	8	1
1928	≥162	?	?	?	?	?	?	?
1942	≥153	≥2	?	≥2	≥87	≥36	≥24	≥2
1945	≥105	?	?	?	≥67	≥29	≥8	≥1
1946	≥164	≥83	?	≥1	≥49	≥17	≥14	0
1947	≥129	?	?	≥1	≥92	≥19	≥15	≥2
1948	≥159	?	?	≥1	≥114	≥29	≥15	0
1949	≥279	≥71	?	≥2	≥135	≥52	≥19	0
1950	201	0	16	86	68	24	7	0
1951	260	0	49	100	83	23	5	0
1952	240	0	32	82	72	36	18	0
1953	421	0	66	159	134	40	17	5
1954	550	0	89	226	189	39	7	0
1955	591	0	170	217	164	30	8	2
1956	504	0	125	181	147	38	12	1
1957	857	0	216	305	236	74	23	3
1958	564	0	145	233	145	36	4	1
1959	604	0	145	262	155	35	7	0
1960	616	0	128	262	175	44	6	1
1961	697	0	154	241	229	66	7	0
1962	657	0	191	265	162	33	6	0
1963	463	0	98	179	148	33	5	0
1964	704	0	169	268	216	39	10	2
1965	897	0	246	300	249	71	30	1
1966	585	0	169	239	145	25	4	3
1967	927	0	282	327	243	58	17	0
1968	657	0	192	251	163	39	8	4
1969	608	0	195	218	139	49	7	0
1970	653	0	164	253	191	36	8	1
1971	889	0	188	380	239	71	10	1
1972	741	0	174	345	181	37	4	0
1973	1,102	0	219	497	301	71	13	1
1974	945	0	222	384	208	95	29	7
1975	919	0	307	376	191	34	11	0
1976	834	0	262	341	168	47	13	3
1977	852	0	338	332	135	37	9	1
1978	789	0	436	225	104	19	5	0
1979	855	0	387	318	116	28	6	0
1980	866	0	269	398	162	32	5	0
1981	782	0	283	320	149	23	7	0
1982	1,047	0	374	421	187	58	6	1
1983	931	0	350	372	147	58	4	0
1984	907	0	373	352	126	41	14	1
1985	684	0	308	259	79	29	10	1
1986	765	0	354	271	116	21	3	0
1987	656	0	340	239	62	12	3	0
1988	702	0	283	311	81	24	3	0
1989	856	0	369	364	102	10	11	0
1990	1,133	0	537	385	155	41	12	3
1991	1,132	0	688	295	103	39	6	1
1992	1,313	0	699	427	129	44	13	1
1993	1,173	0	733	324	80	30	6	0
1994	1,082	0	694	272	81	30	5	0
1995	1,185	0	822	234	98	20	11	0
1996	1,173	0	743	313	94	20	2	1
1997	1,148	0	743	281	85	29	9	1
1998	1,424	0	883	382	116	35	6	2
1999	1,339	0	830	323	122	51	12	1
2000	1,075	0	723	267	62	20	3	0
2001	1,215	0	810	278	98	23	6	0
2002	934	0	623	215	65	26	5	0
2003	1,374	0	891	355	93	27	8	0
2004	1,817	0	1,216	470	103	23	5	0
2005	1,265	0	815	344	85	20	1	0
2006	1,103	0	686	292	93	30	2	0
2007	1,097	0	674	300	91	26	5	1
2008	1,693	0	985	498	151	49	9	1
2009	1,147	0	695	348	82	20	2	0
2010	1,282	0	768	342	127	32	13	0
2011	1,713	0	802	629	198	61	17	6
2012	948	0	583	241	94	26	4	0
2013	916	0	499	309	80	19	8	1
2014	929	0	510	321	71	20	7	0
2015	1,178	0	691	401	65	18	3	0
2016	974	30	530	311	75	26	2	0
2017	1,418	67	615	594	127	13	2	0
2018	1,121	15	619	400	75	12	0	0
2019	1,529	179	655	540	119	33	3	0
2020	1,086	109	443	421	89	18	6	0
2021	1,315	210	545	433	103	21	3	0
2022	1,176	157	406	466	123	20	4	0
2023	1,378	309	463	446	129	29	2	0
2024	1,780	252	575	767	137	43	4	0
2025	1,419	267	408	562	141	35	5	1
2026	1,014	131	353	461	53	15	1	0
Total 1946-2026	≥ 73,342	≥ 1,625	≥ 33,263	≥ 24,648	≥ 10,349	≥ 2,741	≥ 654	≥ 62

== See also ==
- List of tornadoes and tornado outbreaks
- List of individual tornadoes by year
