= Tornadoes of 1963 =

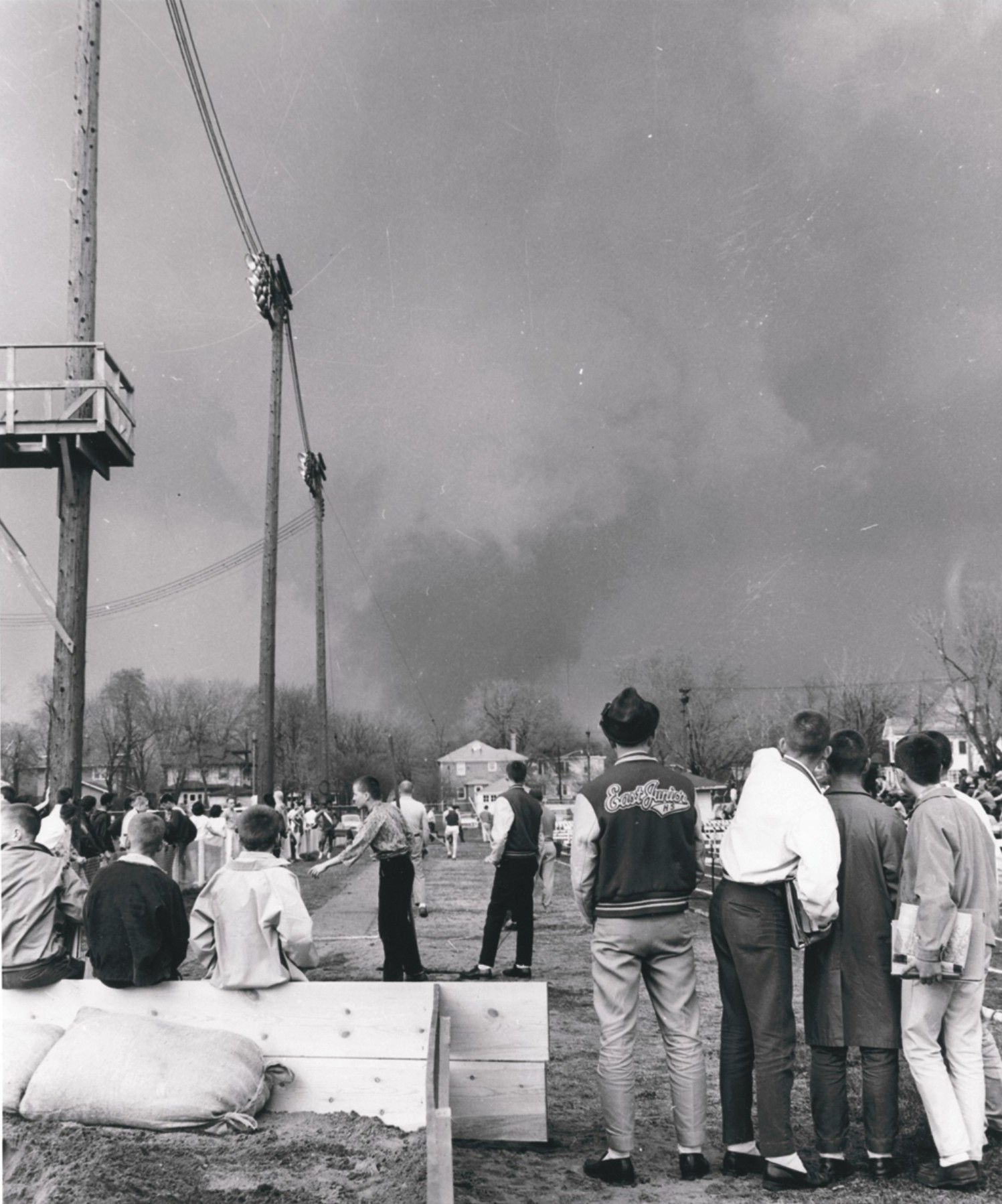
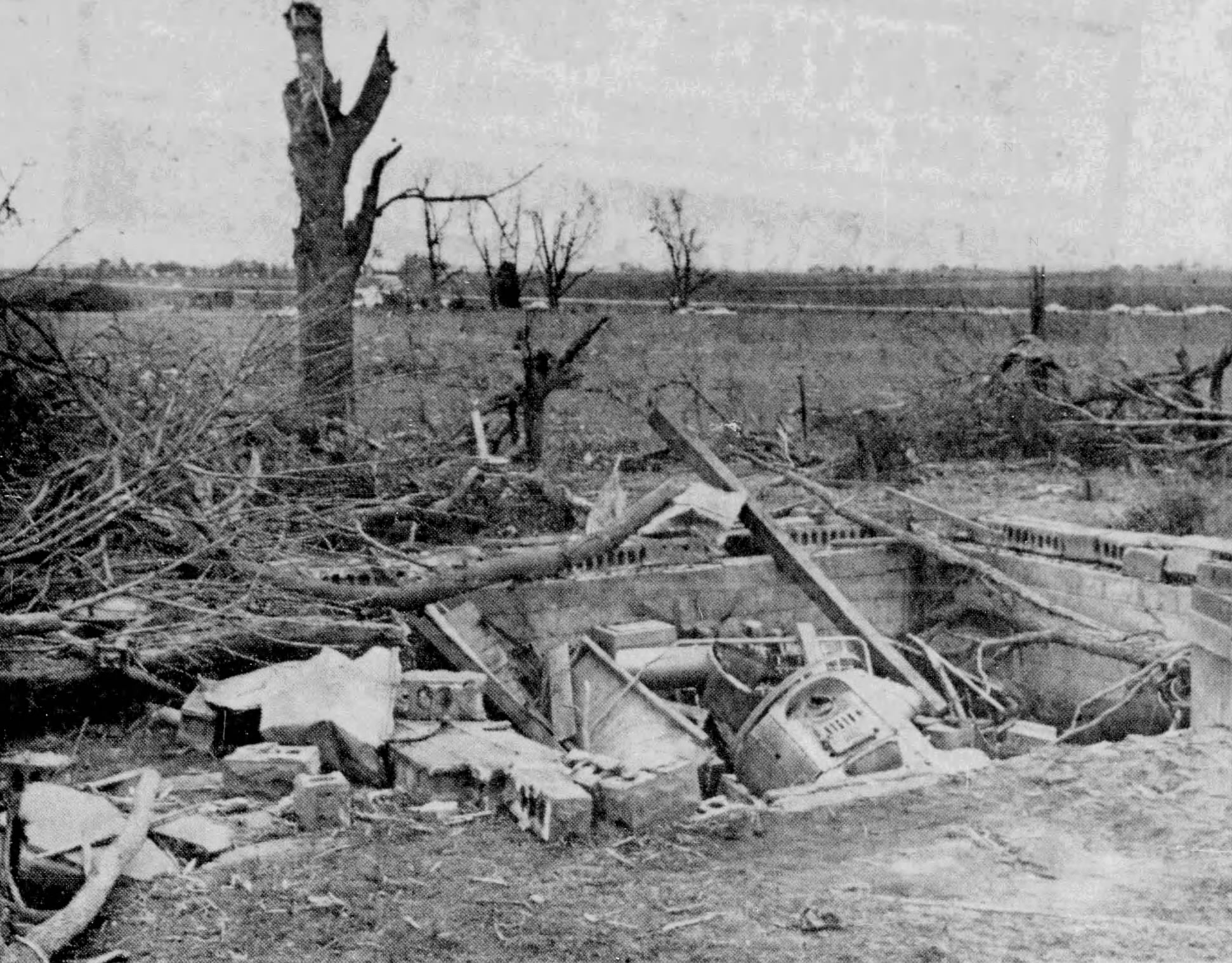
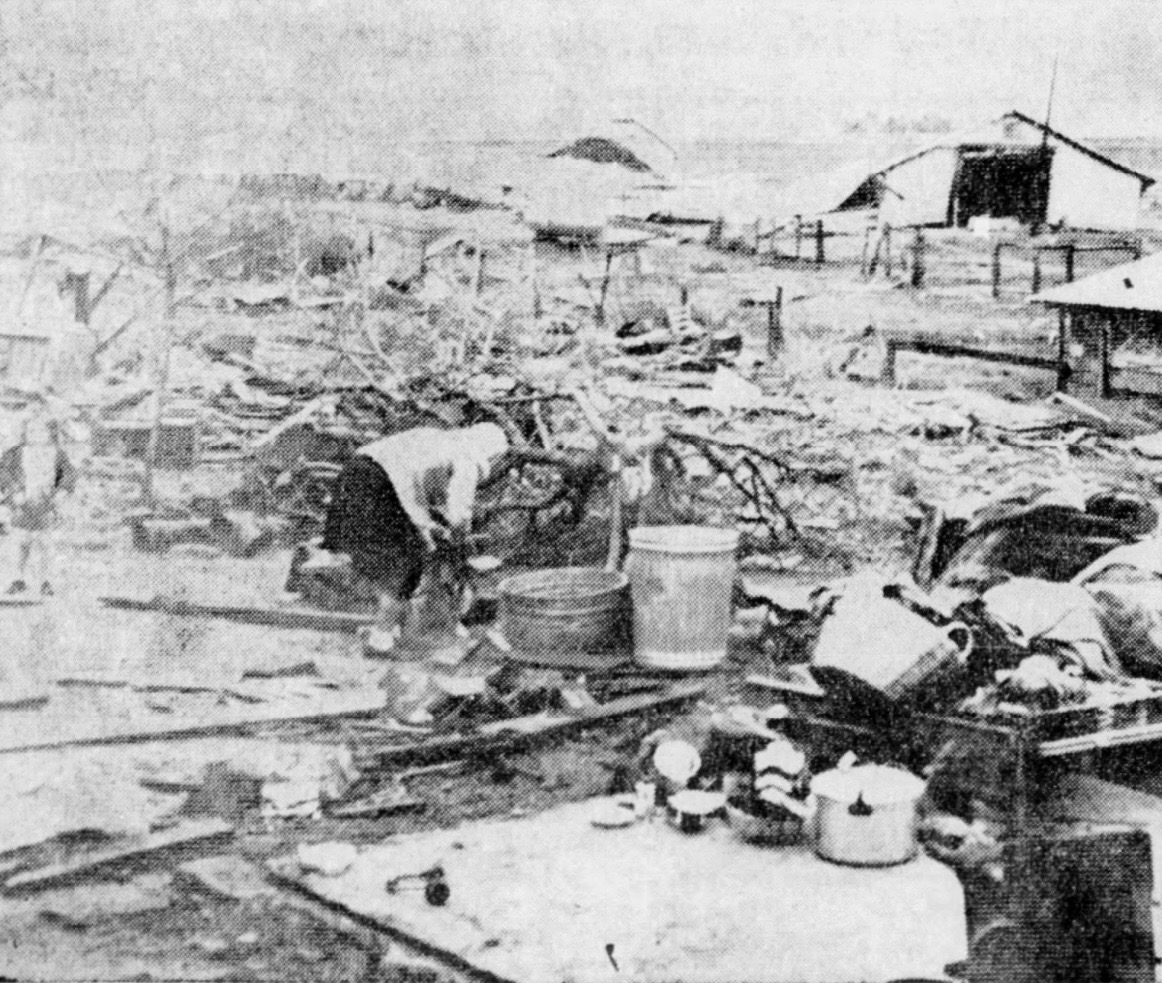
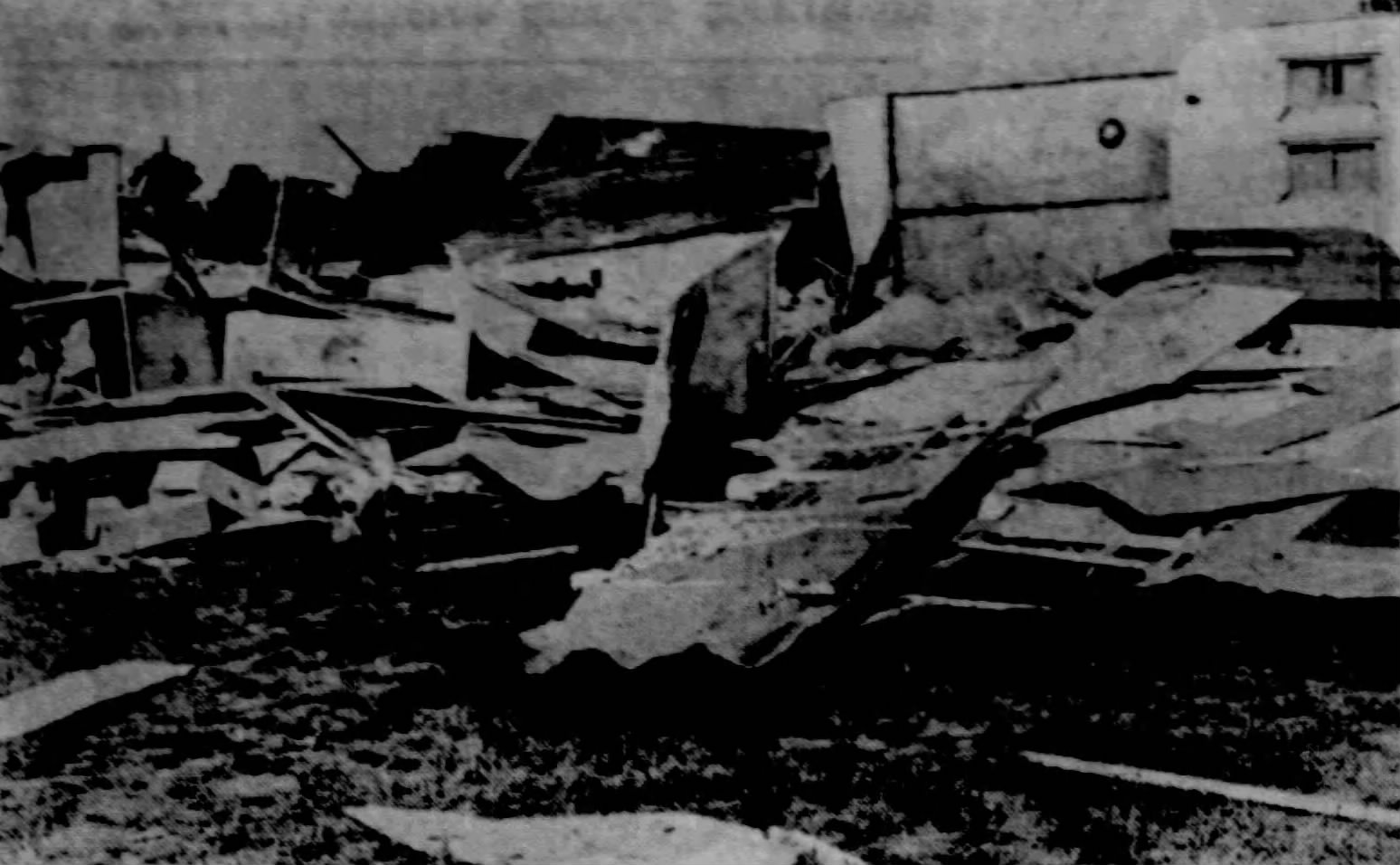
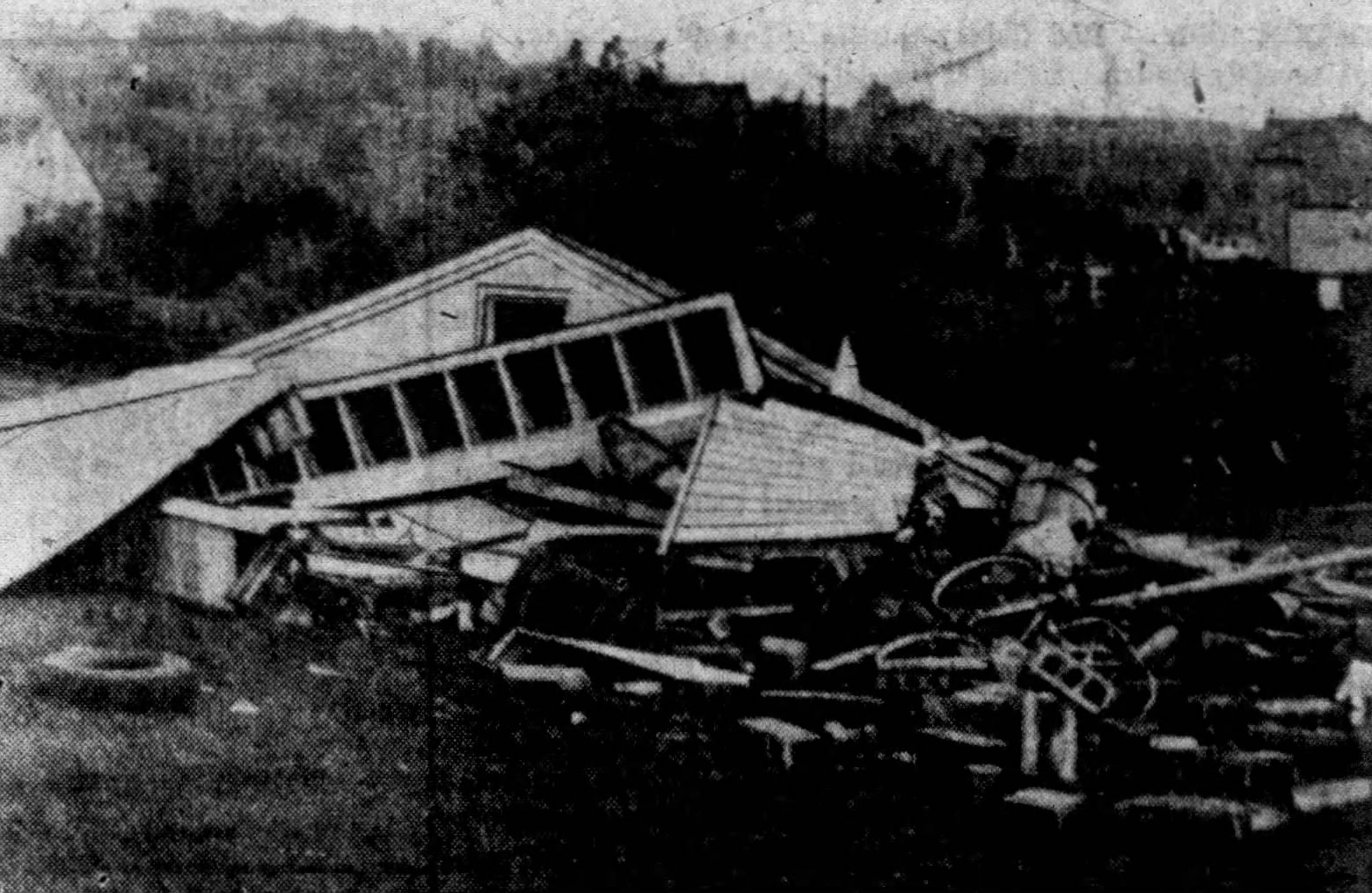
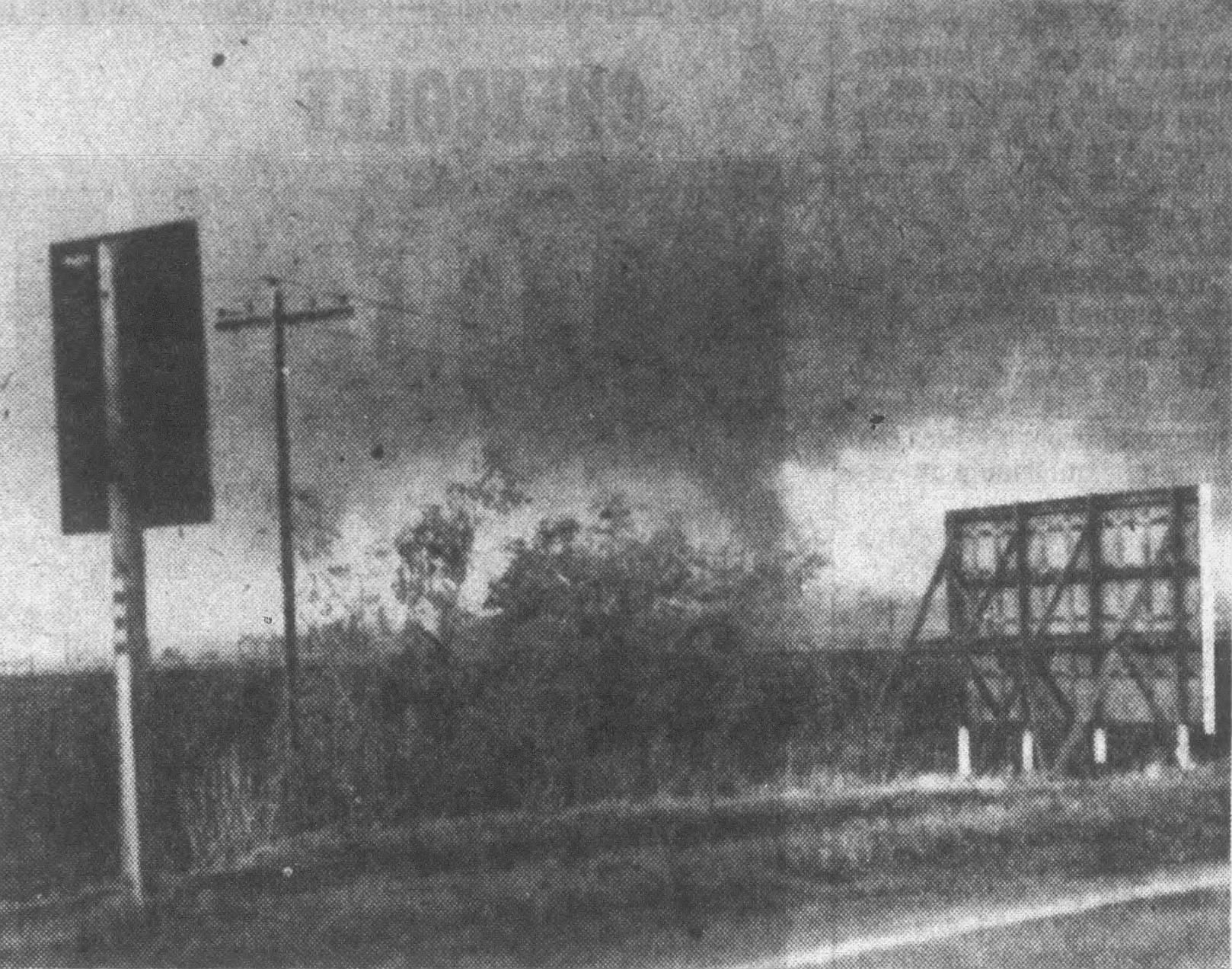
- Clockwise from top: High School students looking north at an F4 tornado as it tracked through Bourbonnais, Illinois on April 17; A home near Fairview, Alabama destroyed after an F4 tornado on March 11; A home near St. Marys, Pennsylvania after being struck by an F3 tornado on September 3; A multi-vortex F3 tornado near Auburn, Nebraska on April 28; Trailer homes near Lodi, Wisconsin after an F3 tornado on August 16; A home wiped off its foundation near Illiopolis, Illinois after an F3 tornado on April 22.
- Timespan: January 10–November 29, 1963
- Maximum rated tornado: F4 tornado: Birmingham, Alabama on March 5; Cullman County, Alabama on March 11; Attala County, Mississippi on March 11; Bourbonnais, Illinois on April 17; Shannon, Mississippi on April 29
- Tornadoes in U.S.: 463
- Damage (U.S.): Unknown
- Fatalities (U.S.): 31
- Fatalities (worldwide): >31

This page documents the tornadoes and tornado outbreaks of 1963, primarily in the United States. Most tornadoes form in the U.S., although some events may take place internationally. Tornado statistics for older years like this often appear significantly lower than modern years due to fewer reports or confirmed tornadoes.

== Events ==
Fatal United States tornadoes in 1963
- Approximate touchdown location of killer tornadoes in 1963
Summary of tornadoes
- January 20 – Georgia (1 death)
- March 11 – Alabama (2 deaths)
- March 11 – Mississippi (2 deaths)
- March 11 – Alabama (1 death)
- March 11 – Tennessee (1 death)
- March 19 – Indiana (2 deaths)
- April 17 – Illinois, Indiana (1 death)
- April 17 – Michigan (1 death)
- April 22 – Illinois (1 death)
- April 28 – Nebraska (1 death)
- April 29 – Mississippi (5 deaths)
- April 29 – Missouri (1 death)
- April 29 – Tennessee (3 deaths)
- April 29 – Mississippi (3 deaths)
- May 26 – Oklahoma (1 death)
- August 3 – Pennsylvania (2 deaths)
- September 29 – North Carolina, South Carolina (3 deaths)
Total fatalities: 31

=== United States yearly total ===
Confirmed tornadoes by Fujita rating
FU	F0	F1	F2	F3	F4	F5	Total
0	98	179	148	33	5	0	463

== January ==
There were 15 tornadoes confirmed in the US in January.

=== January 10–11 ===
FU	F0	F1	F2	F3	F4	F5
0	0	1	2	1	0	0

Four destructive tornadoes touched down in the Southeast and Indiana. It started just before midnight in Tennessee on January 10 when a large, intense 400-yard-wide (370 m) F3 tornado struck Spring Hill, injuring four. The next morning, an F1 tornado moved through the Northern and Eastern New Orleans suburbs, including the town of Meraux, injuring three. F2 tornadoes also caused heavy damage in Thomaston, Georgia and Marshfield, Indiana later that day. Overall, the tornadoes injured seven.

=== January 19–20 ===
FU	F0	F1	F2	F3	F4	F5
0	0	5	5	0	0	0

Another outbreak of 10 tornadoes struck the Southeast. On January 19, an F2 tornado caused major damage when it struck Northern Grove Hill. The next day in Georgia, a large 400-yard-wide (370 m) F2 tornado struck Ellaville, Oglethorpe, and Montezuma, injuring one. Another F2 tornado then struck northwest of Danville, injuring two. At the same time, a large, long-tracked 500-yard-wide (460 m) F1 tornado traveled 70.2 miles (113.0 km) through Fort Gaines, Mullins Crossroads, Southern Dawson, and Southern Lake Blackshear, causing major damage, killing one and injuring four. Another F2 tornado, then moved between Perry and Woody Acres as it struck Kathleen, injuring one. An additional F2 tornado also caused considerable damage in Uvalda. After a lull in activity, the outbreak ended with an F1 tornado east of Hubert, North Carolina. Overall, the outbreak killed one and injured eight.

== February ==
There were 5 tornadoes confirmed in the US in February.

== March ==
There were 49 tornadoes confirmed in the US in March.

=== March 1 ===
A rare F1 tornado touched down in Barbers Point Housing, Hawaii. It caused only moderate damage and no casualties.

=== March 4–5 ===
FU	F0	F1	F2	F3	F4	F5
0	0	5	0	0	1	0

A small, but destructive outbreak of six tornadoes struck Oklahoma, Missouri, Alabama, and Georgia. It started early on March 4 when an F1 tornado caused considerable damage in Frederick, Oklahoma. Three more F1 tornadoes touched down in Missouri throughout the morning hours. The next day, a large, violent, 667-yard-wide (610 m) F4 tornado was observed by several people as it tore through the Southern Birmingham suburbs of Bessemer, Homewood, and Mountain Brook, Alabama on the same day as the vote for the Birmingham mayor. The worst damage was in Bessemer along second and third avenues between 19th and 21st streets. In all, the tornado damaged 240 buildings, destroyed 29 other buildings, caused major damage to 25 more buildings, and injured 35. Later, the same storm produced a narrow F1 tornado that injured three, destroyed one home, damaged several others, and blew down numerous trees in Eastern Rock Run, Alabama before moving into Georgia. There, it grew to 400 yards (370 m) wide and struck Southern Haney, Cave Springs, and Six Mile, injuring two more. Overall, the outbreak ended up injuring 40.

=== March 10–12 ===
FU	F0	F1	F2	F3	F4	F5
0	0	4	11	1	2	0

A second and even more destructive outbreak of 18 tornadoes pummeled the Southeast, killing six and injuring 38.

=== March 18–19 ===
FU	F0	F1	F2	F3	F4	F5
0	0	2	7	0	0	0

Another outbreak of nine tornadoes struck Oklahoma, Tennessee, Indiana, and Kentucky. It started with an isolated F2 tornado lifed a barn off its foundation and partially destroyed another one north of Tupelo, Oklahoma on March 18. The last four tornadoes that occurred the next day all caused casualties. First, an F1 tornado killed two women in Becks Mills, Indiana southwest of Salem when the old storm cellar they were in collapsed. Next, an F1 tornado injured four in Devon, Kentucky just outside of Cincinnati, Ohio. A strong F2 tornado then injured three and caused severe damage in Northern Cleveland, Tennessee. Finally, the same complex of storms dropped another F2 tornado that injured one in Northwestern Athens, Tennessee. In the end, the outbreak killed two and injured eight.

=== March 28 ===
A second rare F1 tornado struck Kawela Bay, Hawaii after coming ashore as a waterspout, causing an estimated $20,000 in damage to three beach houses and injuring one person.

== April ==
There were 84 tornadoes confirmed in the US in April.

=== April 17 ===
FU	F0	F1	F2	F3	F4	F5
0	1	1	2	1	1	0

A localized, but destructive outbreak of six tornadoes hit Illinois, Indiana, Missouri, and Michigan, killing two and injuring 71.

=== April 18–19 ===
FU	F0	F1	F2	F3	F4	F5
0	1	9	10	1	0	0

The previous outbreak was followed by a weaker, but larger outbreak of 22 tornadoes across the Midwest and the Ohio Valley, injuring 23.

=== April 22 ===
FU	F0	F1	F2	F3	F4	F5
0	0	1	2	4	0	0

Another deadly outbreak of seven tornadoes hit the Midwest, killing one and injuring 70.

=== April 28–30 ===
FU	F0	F1	F2	F3	F4	F5
0	3	10	16	7	1	0

The final three days of April produced the biggest outbreak of the month, with 37 tornadoes touching down across the Midwest, Mississippi Valley, and Southeast. The outbreak left 13 dead and 72 injured.

== May ==
There were 71 tornadoes confirmed in the US in May.

=== May 19–20 ===
FU	F0	F1	F2	F3	F4	F5
0	1	4	4	1	0	0

An outbreak of 10 tornadoes hit New England, Texas and Georgia, although there were no casualties.

=== May 25–27 ===
FU	F0	F1	F2	F3	F4	F5
0	4	8	6	3	0	0

An outbreak of 21 tornadoes hit the Midwest and Alabama, killing one and injuring 13.

== June ==
There were 90 tornadoes confirmed in the US in June.

=== June 5 (France) ===
A narrow & brief but strong F2 tornado caused damage in Nevian, France.

== July ==
There were 62 tornadoes confirmed in the US in July.

== August ==
There were 26 tornadoes confirmed in the US in August.

=== August 1 (France) ===
FU	F0	F1	F2	F3	F4	F5
0	0	0	0	2	0	0

2 F3 tornadoes were reported in France, Both of which reached a total width of 500 meters (546 yards).

=== August 3 ===
A brief, isolated, but strong F3 tornado killed two and injured 70 in Pennsylvania.

=== August 16 ===
FU	F0	F1	F2	F3	F4	F5
0	0	0	0	3	0	0

Three F3 tornadoes injured 39 in Wisconsin.

=== August 20 (Germany) ===
FU	F0	F1	F2	F3	F4	F5
1	0	0	1	0	0	0

A high-end F2 tornado was reported in Moers, Germany. A second tornado was reported in the Netherlands.

=== August 27 (Denmark) ===
FU	F0	F1	F2	F3	F4	F5
1	0	0	0	1	0	0

A brief waterspout occurred in the Baltic sea. Later on in the morning, a High-End F3/T7 tornado damaged over 20 buildings, including a school in and around Fårvang, Denmark. At least 2 homes were entirely destroyed. A barn were also destroyed. The tornado caused damage up to 201 thousand Danish Krone. ESWD mentions that it may have reached F4 intensity.

== September ==
There were 33 tornadoes confirmed in the US in September.

=== September 1–4 ===
FU	F0	F1	F2	F3	F4	F5
0	4	3	2	1	0	0

Scattered activity across the US produced 10 tornadoes and 21 injuries.

=== September 10–11 ===
FU	F0	F1	F2	F3	F4	F5
0	1	6	0	0	0	0

An outbreak of seven weak tornadoes struck the Midwest, Ohio Valley, and New England with an F1 tornado injuring nine in the southeastern suburbs of Columbus, Ohio.

=== September 28–29 ===
FU	F0	F1	F2	F3	F4	F5
0	0	2	7	0	0	0

An outbreak of nine tornadoes hit the Southeast, killing three and injuring 18.

== October ==
There were 13 tornadoes confirmed in the US in October.

== November ==
There were 15 tornadoes confirmed in the US in November.

== December ==
There were no tornadoes confirmed in the US in December, the first occurrence of this since October 1952.

== See also ==
- Tornado
  - Tornadoes by year
  - Tornado records
  - Tornado climatology
  - Tornado myths
- List of tornado outbreaks
  - List of F5 and EF5 tornadoes
  - List of North American tornadoes and tornado outbreaks
  - List of 21st-century Canadian tornadoes and tornado outbreaks
  - List of European tornadoes and tornado outbreaks
  - List of tornadoes and tornado outbreaks in Asia
  - List of Southern Hemisphere tornadoes and tornado outbreaks
  - List of tornadoes striking downtown areas
  - List of tornadoes with confirmed satellite tornadoes
- Tornado intensity
  - Fujita scale
  - Enhanced Fujita scale
