= Tornadoes of 1988 =

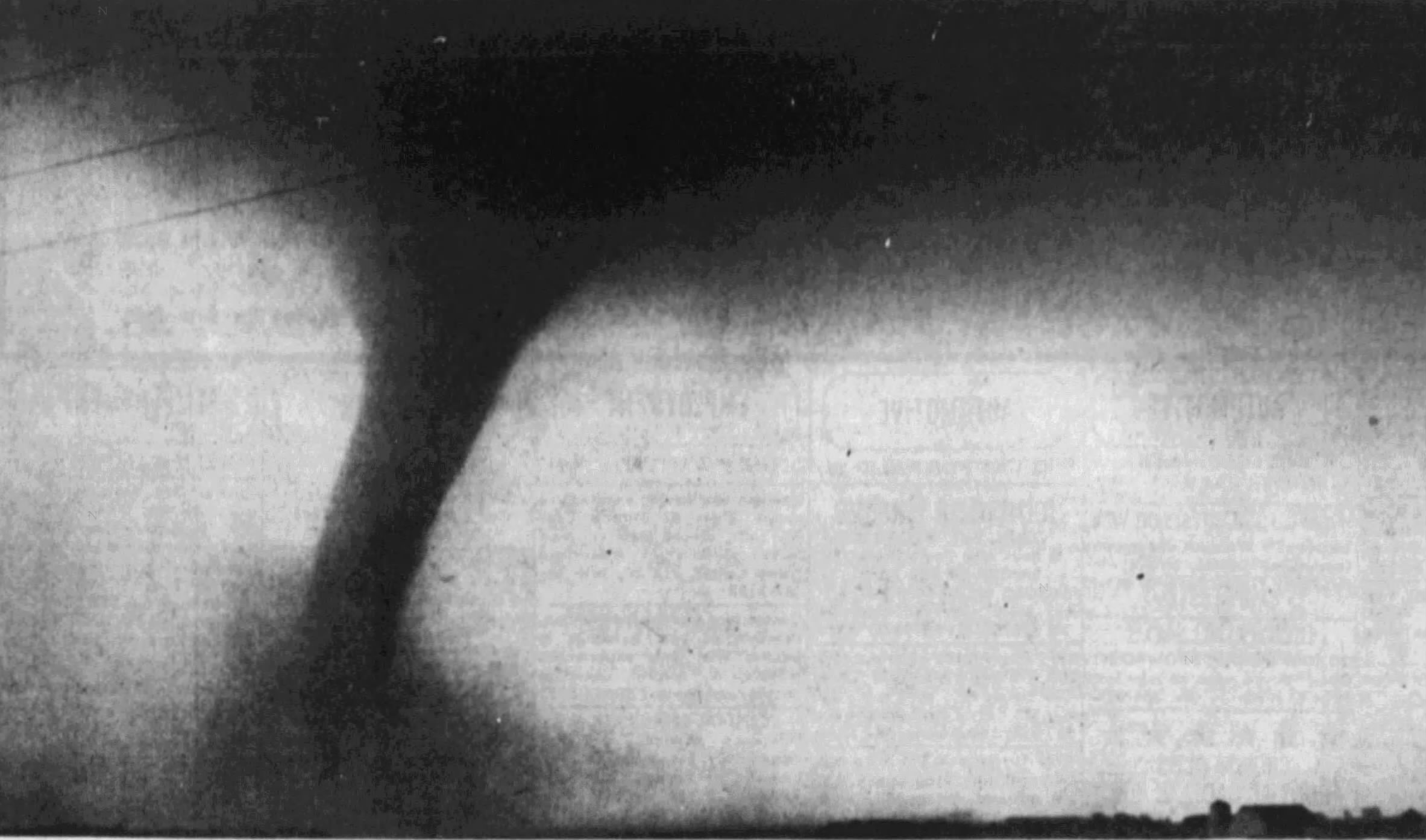
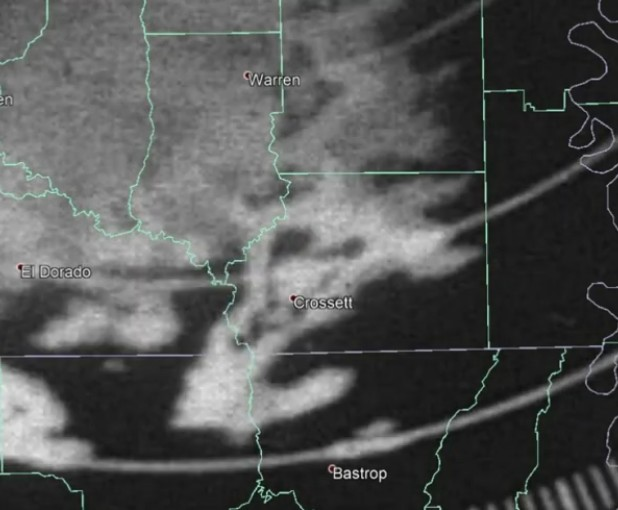
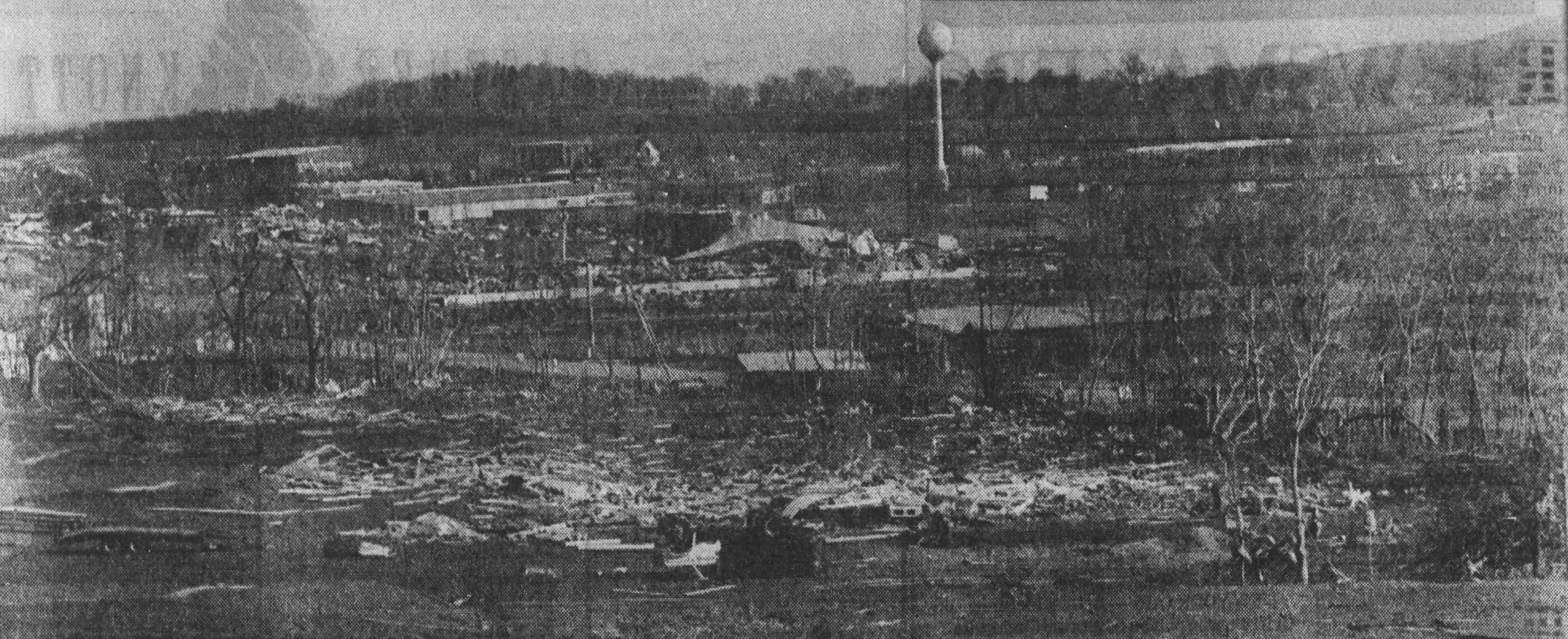
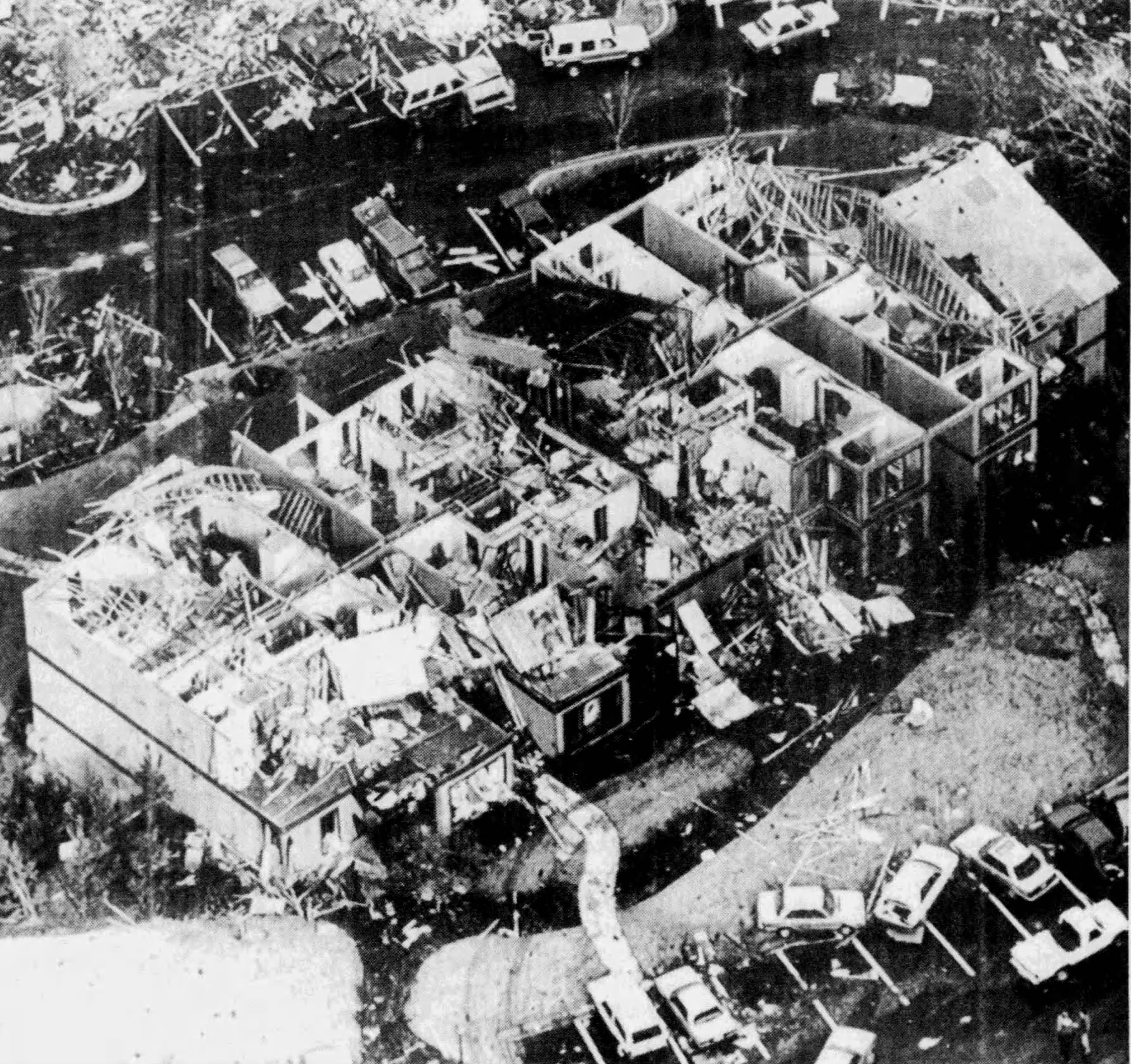
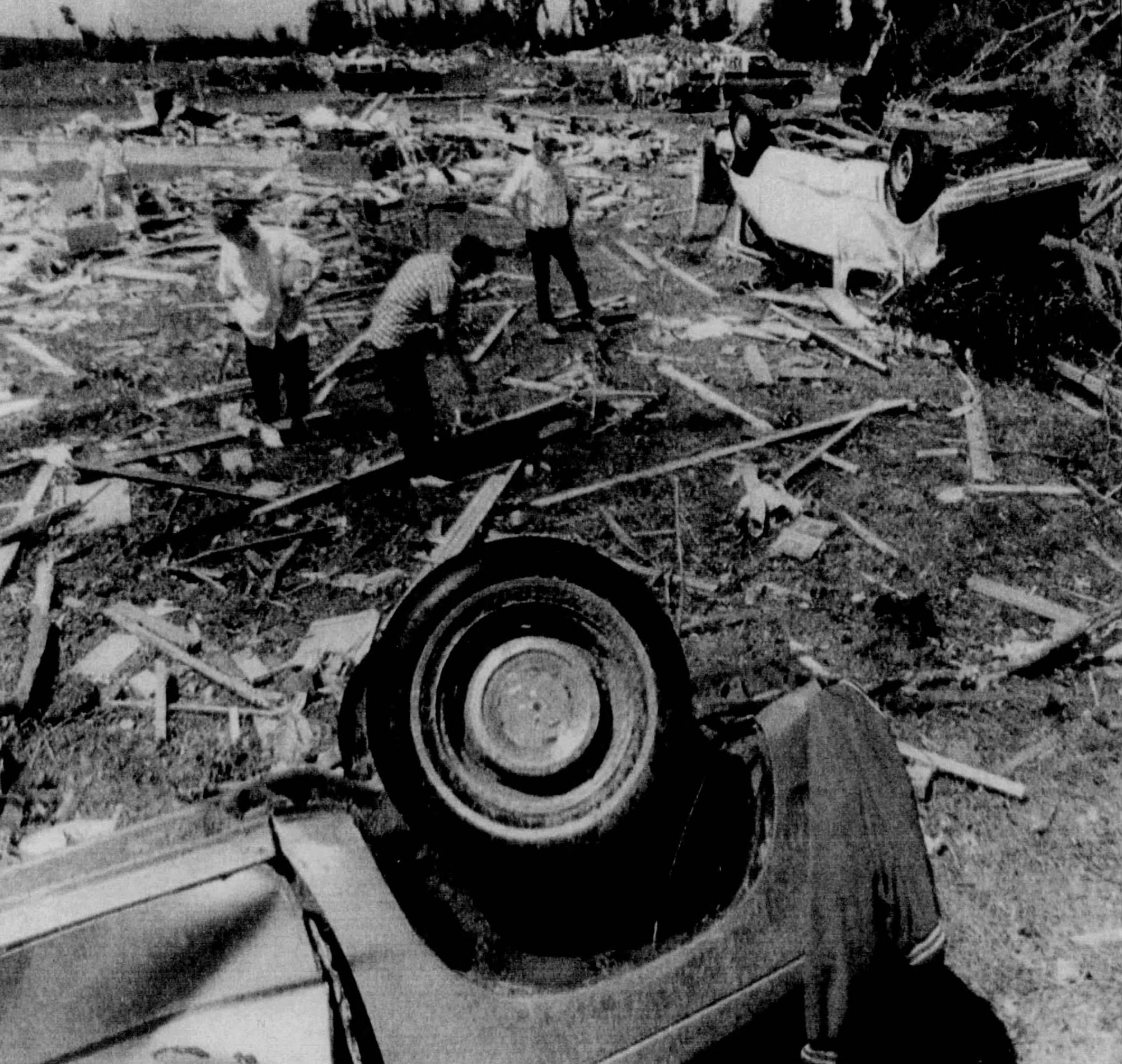
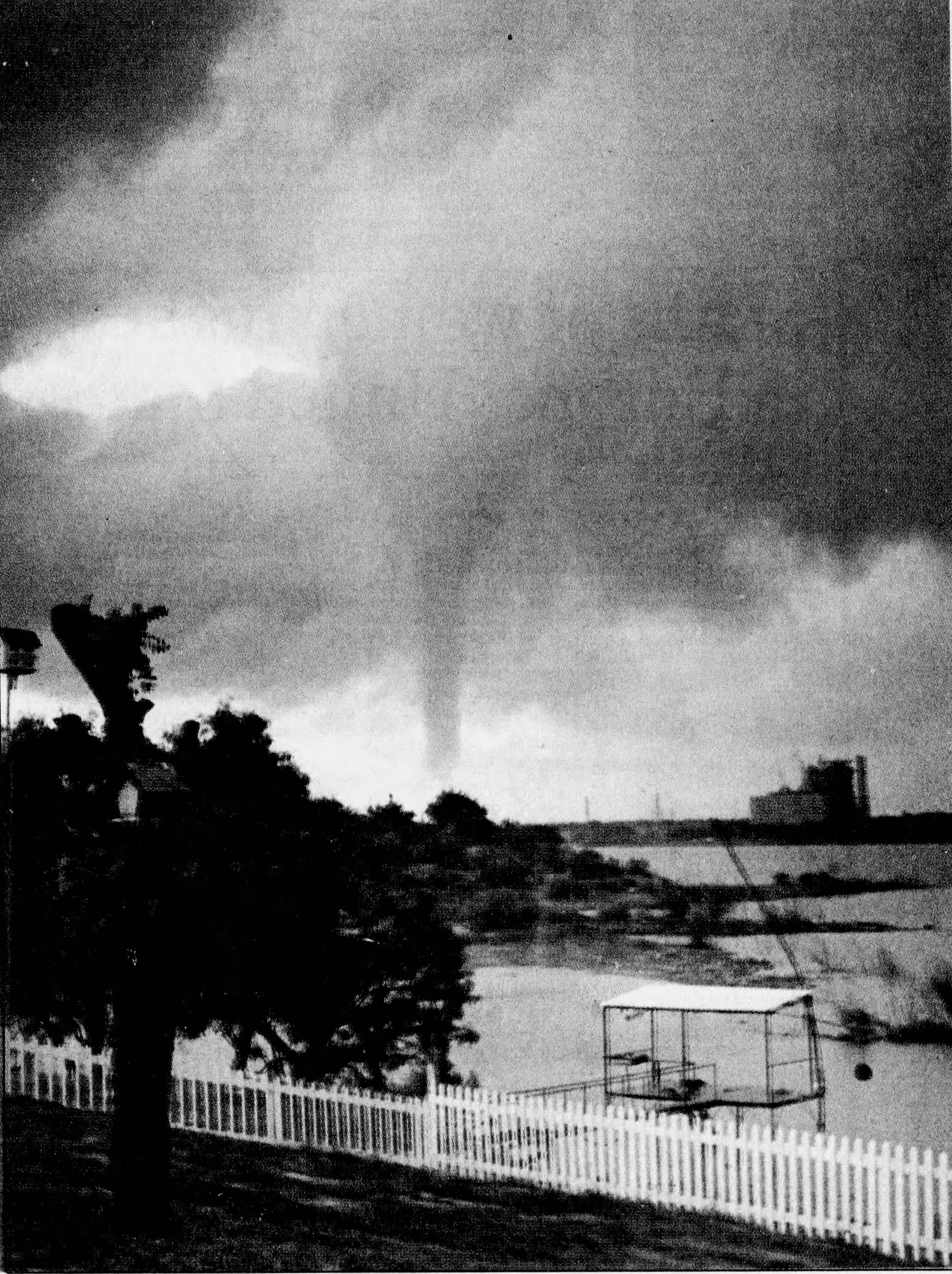
- Clockwise from top: An F1 tornado south of Finley, North Dakota on June 18; Damage to homes near Franklin, Tennessee after an F4 tornado on December 24; Damage to a neighborhood near Madison, Florida after a violent tornado on April 18; A tornado near Abilene, Texas on June 26; Damage to an apartment building in Raleigh, North Carolina after an F4 tornado on November 28; A WSR-57 radar image of a tornado producing supercell near Crossett, Arkansas on January 19.
- Timespan: January–December 1988
- Maximum rated tornado: F4 tornado: Liberty Chapel, Mississippi on January 19; Raleigh, North Carolina on November 28; Franklin, Tennessee on December 24
- Tornadoes in U.S.: 702
- Damage (U.S.): $1.1 billion (1988 USD)
- Fatalities (U.S.): 32
- Fatalities (worldwide): >32

This page documents the tornadoes and tornado outbreaks of 1988, primarily in the United States. Most tornadoes form in the U.S., although some events may take place internationally. Tornado statistics for older years like this often appear significantly lower than modern years due to fewer reports or confirmed tornadoes.

== Synopsis ==
Fatal United States tornadoes in 1988
- Approximate touchdown location of killer tornadoes in 1988 Summary of tornadoes: January 19 – Tennessee (1 death); January 19 – Tennessee (3 deaths); January 19 – Tennessee (1 death); March 28 – Oklahoma (1 death); April 19 – Florida (4 deaths); May 7 – Nebraska (2 deaths); May 9 – Kentucky (1 death); August 14 – Michigan (1 death); August 28 – South Carolina (1 death); August 28 – New York (1 death); September 17 – Texas (1 death); November 5 – Florida (1 death); November 15 – Missouri (1 death); November 15 – Arkansas (1 death); November 15 – Arkansas (5 deaths); November 19 – Mississippi (2 deaths); November 27 – North Carolina (4 deaths); December 24 – Tennessee (1 death); Total fatalities: 32

1988 was one of the least active tornado seasons on record. March and April saw unusually low activity, as did June. There were some notable outbreaks later in the year, including the Raleigh tornado which was probably the most publicized tornado event of the year.

== Events ==
Confirmed tornado total for the entire year 1988 in the United States.

Confirmed tornadoes by Fujita rating
FU	F0	F1	F2	F3	F4	F5	Total
0	283	311	81	24	3	0	702

== January ==
There were 17 tornadoes confirmed in the US in January.

=== January 19 ===
A deadly outbreak spawned 14 tornadoes. Three separate tornadoes, rated F2/F3, killed five people in Tennessee, one of which killed 3 and injured 24 in Williston. An F4 tornado also struck Attala County, Mississippi, but resulted in no fatalities.

== February ==
There were 4 tornadoes confirmed in the US in February.

== March ==
There were 28 tornadoes confirmed in the US in March.

== April ==
There were 58 tornadoes confirmed in the US in April.

=== April 19 ===
An F3 tornado killed four people and injured 15 others in Madison, Florida.

== May ==
There were 132 tornadoes confirmed in the US in May.

=== May 8 ===
A large outbreak saw 57 tornadoes, mainly in Iowa, Illinois and Wisconsin (two rated as high as F3 in Darlington, Wisconsin and Eldridge, Iowa). There were no fatalities.

== June ==
There were 63 tornadoes confirmed in the US in June.

=== June 7 ===
An F1 tornado in Smyrna, Delaware caused no fatalities, but at least 30 injuries, with damage estimated between 500,000 and 5 million dollars.

=== June 15 ===
An F3 tornado struck 4.4 miles south of downtown Denver, Colorado.

== July ==
There were 103 tornadoes confirmed in the US in July.

=== July 5 ===
A tornado outbreak saw three F3 tornadoes in and around Fort Benton, Montana. There were no reported fatalities.

== August ==
There were 61 tornadoes confirmed in the US in August.

== September ==
There were 76 tornadoes confirmed in the US in September.

== October ==
There were 19 tornadoes confirmed in the US in October.

=== October 23 (Philippines) ===
A tornado spawned by Typhoon Ruby (Unsang) struck six villages near Cagayan de Oro where it destroyed hundreds of homes, including a bridge, and left at least 20,000 people homeless. A total of 10 people were killed by the tornado, including a 6-year-old child. On the aftermath, the Philippine National Red Cross provided immediate assistance to tornado victims. US Ambassador Nicholas Platt also donated $25,000 to the Philippine National Red Cross for relief assistance.

== November ==
There were 121 tornadoes confirmed in the US in November.

=== November 15 ===
A tornado outbreak spawned 44 tornadoes, including three F3 tornadoes. Seven people were killed, five of which came from F2 tornado in Arkansas.

=== November 28 ===
The 1988 F4 Raleigh tornado killed four people and was part of a series of moderate outbreaks that month.

== December ==
There were 20 tornadoes confirmed in the US in December.

=== December 24 ===
During the morning hours of Christmas Eve, an isolated F4 touched down in Franklin, Tennessee. Seven people were injured, and one man was killed when the roof of his house fell in on him. The tornado caused around 8 million dollars of damage.

== See also ==
- Tornado
  - Tornadoes by year
  - Tornado records
  - Tornado climatology
  - Tornado myths
- List of tornado outbreaks
  - List of F5 and EF5 tornadoes
  - List of North American tornadoes and tornado outbreaks
  - List of 21st-century Canadian tornadoes and tornado outbreaks
  - List of European tornadoes and tornado outbreaks
  - List of tornadoes and tornado outbreaks in Asia
  - List of Southern Hemisphere tornadoes and tornado outbreaks
  - List of tornadoes striking downtown areas
- Tornado intensity
  - Fujita scale
  - Enhanced Fujita scale
