= Tornadoes of 1994 =

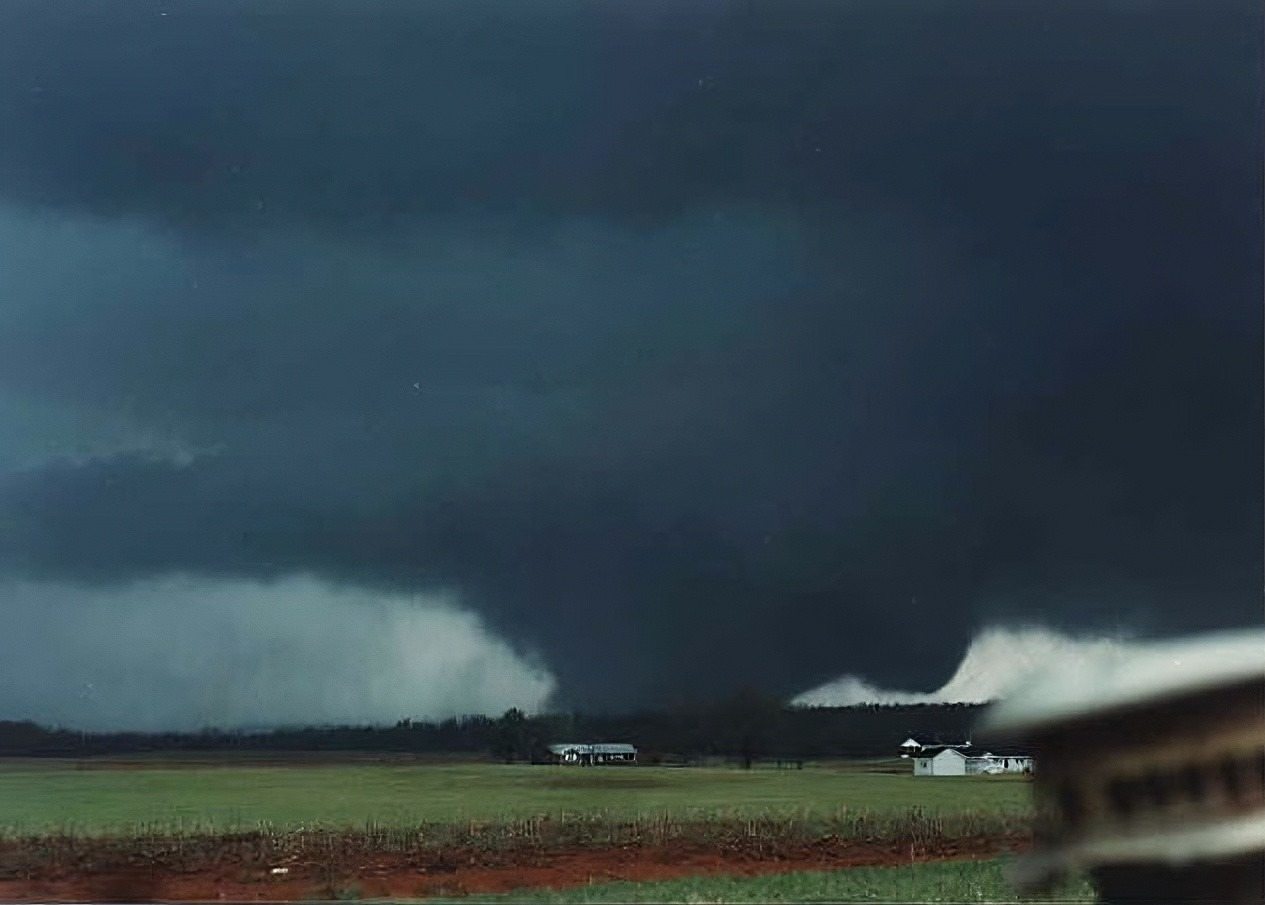
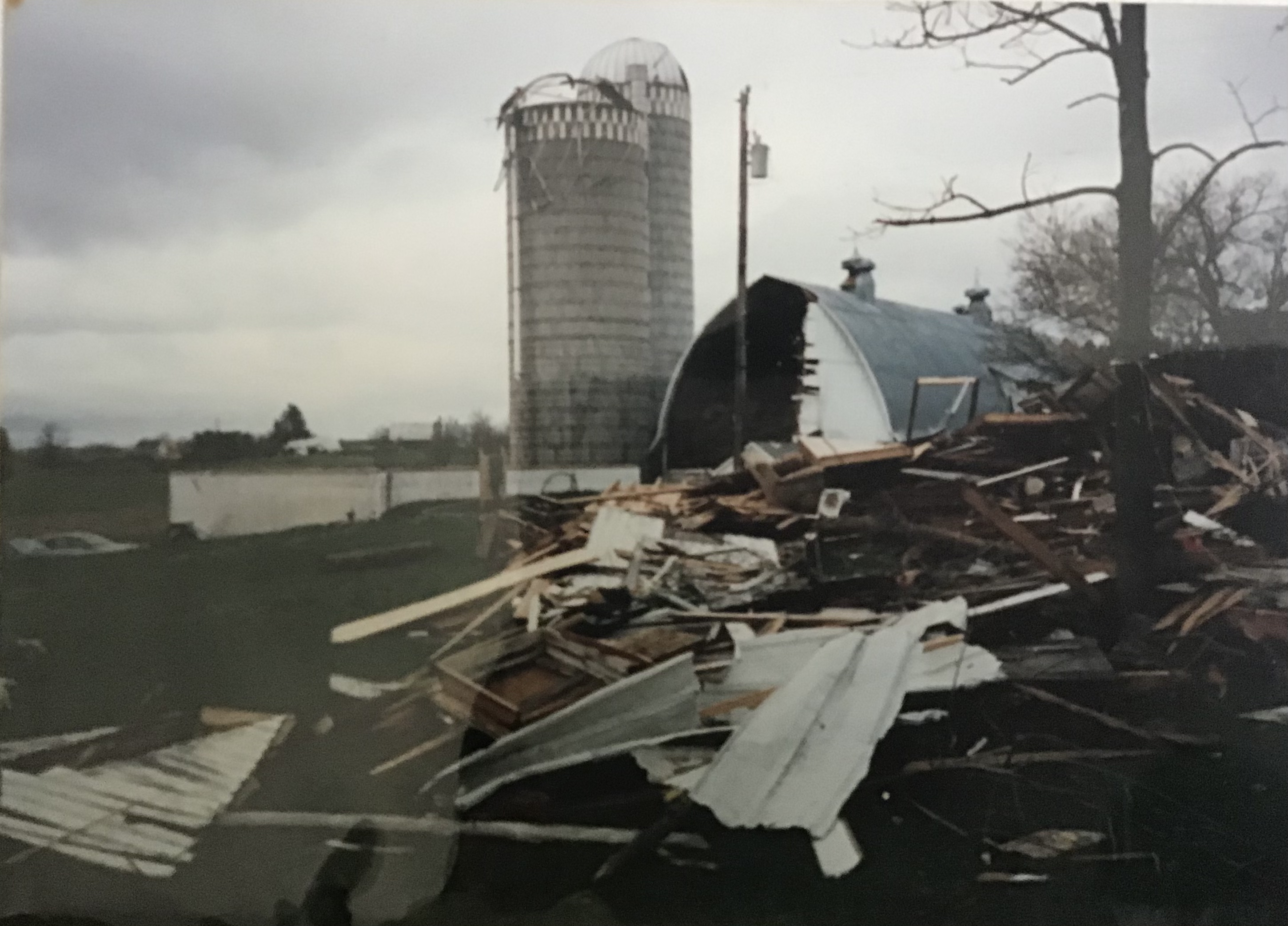
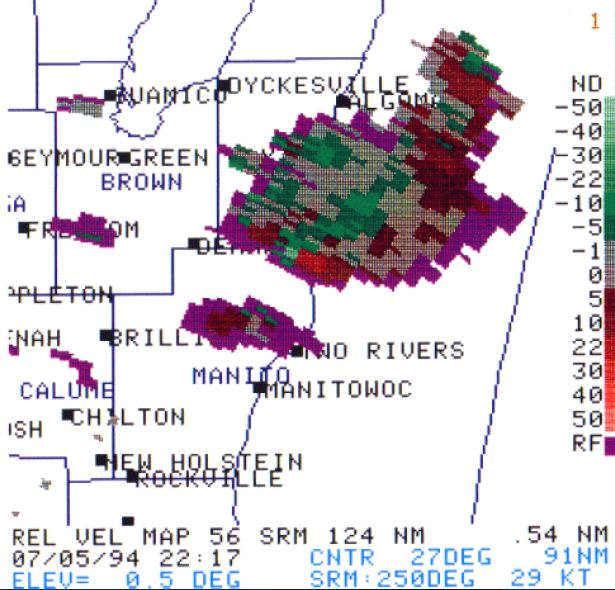
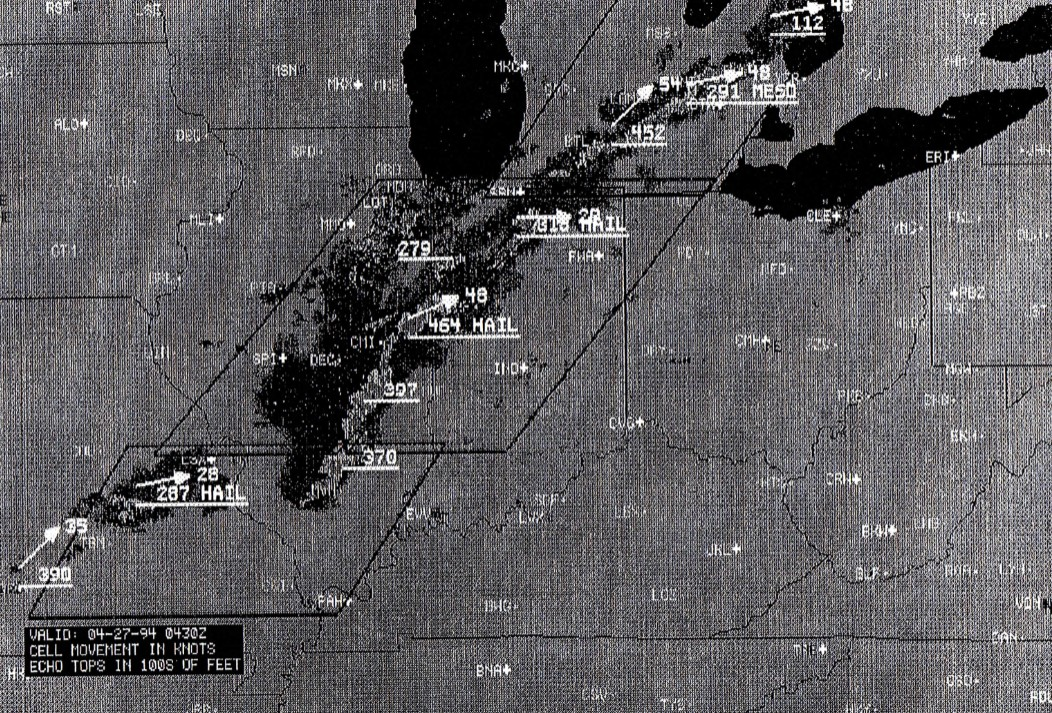
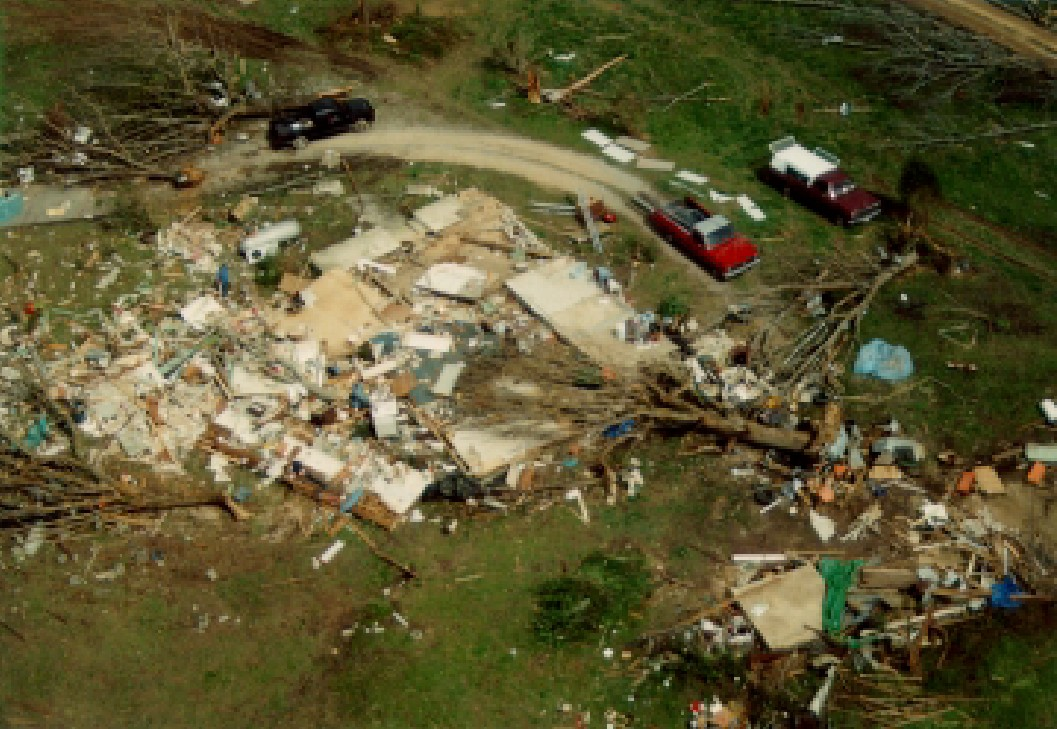
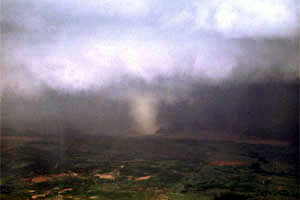
- Clockwise from top: A large and deadly F4 tornado seen north of Piedmont, Alabama on March 27; A radar velocity scan of a tornado producing supercell over Manitowoc County, Wisconsin on July 5; F4 level damage to a home in rural Calhoun County, Alabama after a tornado on March 27; A large F3 tornado near Newcastle, Texas on May 29 as seen from the NOAA P-3 research aircraft; A radar image of tornado producing supercells over western Indiana on April 26; Damage to a farm near Prairie Farm, Wisconsin after an F1 tornado on April 26.
- Timespan: January–December 1994
Maximum rated tornado
F4 tornado
- List
  – Piedmont, Alabama
  on March 27
  – Canton, Georgia
  on March 27
  – Lancaster-Hutchins, Texas
  on April 25
  – West Lafayette, Indiana
  on April 26
  – Maribel, Wisconsin
  on July 5
  – Birtle, Manitoba
  on July 10
- Tornadoes in U.S.: 1,082
- Damage (U.S.): >$267 million
- Fatalities (U.S.): 69
- Fatalities (worldwide): >69

This page documents the tornadoes and tornado outbreaks of 1994, primarily in the United States. Most tornadoes form in the U.S., although some events may take place internationally. Tornado statistics for older years like this often appear significantly lower than modern years due to fewer reports or confirmed tornadoes, however by the 1990s tornado statistics were coming closer to the numbers we see today.

== Synopsis ==
Fatal United States tornadoes in 1994
- Approximate touchdown location of killer tornadoes in 1994 Summary of tornadoes: March 27 – Alabama (22 deaths); March 27 – Georgia (3 deaths); March 27 – Georgia (3 deaths); March 27 – Georgia (9 deaths); March 27 – Georgia (3 deaths); April 11 – Missouri (1 death); April 12 – Mississippi (2 deaths); April 15 – Tennessee (1 death); April 15 – Texas (1 death); April 15 – South Carolina (1 death); April 25 – Texas (3 deaths); April 26 – Indiana (3 deaths); June 25 – Missouri (1 death); June 27 – Georgia (1 death); June 27 – Georgia (1 death); July 27 – Pennsylvania (3 deaths); August 27 – Wisconsin (2 deaths); August 27 – Wisconsin (2 deaths); November 15 – Florida (1 death); November 27 – Tennessee (1 death); November 27 – Tennessee (3 deaths); November 27 – Mississippi (2 deaths); Total fatalities: 69

During the first three months of the year, the number of tornadoes and tornado outbreaks were average to below average (with the exception of the March 27 tornado outbreak). Afterwards, from a time period from April to August, there were well over 100 tornadoes from several tornado outbreaks. The fall season saw fewer tornadoes, with the exception of a moderate outbreak in November. The killer F4 tornado that struck Piedmont, Alabama on Palm Sunday (a date of infamous tornado outbreaks in 1965 and 1920) killed 22 people, the most since the 1990 Plainfield, Illinois tornado.

== Events ==
=== United States yearly total ===
Confirmed tornadoes by Fujita rating
FU	F0	F1	F2	F3	F4	F5	Total
0	694	272	81	30	5	0	1,082

== January ==
There were a total of 13 tornadoes confirmed in the United States in January.

=== January 26–27 ===
FU	F0	F1	F2	F3	F4	F5
0	1	2	1	0	0	0

Four tornadoes touched down in Mississippi, including one F2 tornado that injured seven people in the city of Brookhaven, Mississippi.

== February ==
There were 9 tornadoes confirmed in the United States in February, including a rare F2 in Oroville, California that destroyed 47 homes, injuring two.

== March ==
There were 58 tornadoes confirmed in the United States in March.

=== March 27 ===
FU	F0	F1	F2	F3	F4	F5
0	10	6	4	7	2	0

The third notable tornado outbreak to occur on Palm Sunday and the second in the Southeastern United States, this deadly series of 27 tornadoes became the most notable tornado event of the year, resulting in 40 fatalities. Two tornadoes were rated F4, including the Piedmont, Alabama tornado that killed 22 people.

== April ==
There were 205 tornadoes confirmed in the United States in April.

=== April 11–15 ===
Tornadoes touched down across several states, resulting in one fatality. An F4 tornado touched down on the west shore of Lake Houston, moved across the lake and crossed the eastern shore and into a subdivision. One woman died when a mobile home park was hit.

=== April 25–27 ===
FU	F0	F1	F2	F3	F4	F5
0	65	24	10	0	2	0

A widespread tornado outbreak affected much of the United States from Colorado to New York. The outbreak killed at least six people across two states from two F4 tornadoes near Dallas, Texas and Lafayette, Indiana.

== May ==
There were 161 tornadoes confirmed in the United States in May.

== June ==
There were 234 tornadoes confirmed in the United States in June.

=== June 13–14 ===
Four tornadoes touched down on June 13, including an F2 tornado in Jackson, Michigan and another F2 tornado in Olean, New York. Three weak tornadoes also touched down the next day.

=== June 18 ===
At least one tornado was confirmed in St. Francis/Portage Lake, Maine and caused two injuries.

=== June 25–27 ===
Tornadoes on June 25 and June 27 resulted in three fatalities in Missouri and Georgia.

=== June 30 (Philippines) ===
An EFU tornado struck four villages near Cagayan de Oro. It picked up water as it crossed nearby rivers and dumped as much as two meters on tha villages where it swept several houses away. More than 3,800 people were evacuated, 8 people were killed, and three others were rendered missing. Among those killed, some were found more than 70 km (43.5 mi) away from where the tornado struck.

== July ==
There were 155 tornadoes were confirmed in the United States in July.

=== July 5 ===
An F4 tornado struck Maribel, Wisconsin. No fatalities were reported.

=== July 10 (Canada) ===
An F4 tornado struck areas south of Birtle, Manitoba, damaging several farmsteads and injuring two. It was on the ground for 29.2 km (18.1 mi).

=== July 27 ===
An F3 tornado killed three people in Limerick, Pennsylvania.

== August ==
There were 120 tornadoes confirmed in the United States in August.

=== August 4 (Canada) ===
An F3 struck the Aylmer, Quebec area just outside Ottawa. Several homes were destroyed and hundreds others were damaged, extensively. A total of 15 people were injured and damage was estimated at $15 million. It was the first F3 in the Canadian province of Quebec since the Maskinonge/Pierreville area tornado of August 27, 1991.

=== August 16 ===
A tornado outbreak associated with Tropical Storm Beryl produced 23 tornadoes in South Carolina, including three F3 tornadoes.

=== August 27 ===
A deadly outbreak produced 12 tornadoes, including two F3 tornadoes that resulted in four fatalities in Wisconsin. The outbreak also produced a violent F4 tornado in Turtle Mountain, Manitoba.

== September ==
There were 30 tornadoes confirmed in the United States in September.

== October ==
There were 51 tornadoes confirmed in the United States in October.

=== October 8 (Philippines) ===
A strong tornado struck a village in San Fernando, Pampanga at around 15:30 PhST where it destroyed 40 houses, uprooted trees and electrical posts. It Injured 29 people, including children, were sent to a nearby hospital for treatments.

== November ==
There were 42 tornadoes confirmed in the United States in November.

=== November 26–28 ===
A small but destructive outbreak produced over 20 tornadoes across the Southern United States, resulting in six fatalities and 45 injuries. An F3 tornado tore through Shelby and Fayette County, Tennessee, killing three after destroying 28 homes, damaging 300 other homes and badly damaging a high school. A woman was killed when an F3 tornado struck her house. Two more people were killed in an F3 tornado in Mississippi.

== December ==
Four tornadoes were confirmed in the United States in December.

== See also ==
- Tornado
  - Tornadoes by year
  - Tornado records
  - Tornado climatology
  - Tornado myths
- List of tornado outbreaks
  - List of F5 and EF5 tornadoes
  - List of North American tornadoes and tornado outbreaks
  - List of 21st-century Canadian tornadoes and tornado outbreaks
  - List of European tornadoes and tornado outbreaks
  - List of tornadoes and tornado outbreaks in Asia
  - List of Southern Hemisphere tornadoes and tornado outbreaks
  - List of tornadoes striking downtown areas
- Tornado intensity
  - Fujita scale
  - Enhanced Fujita scale
