= 1994 Palm Sunday tornado outbreak =

Weather event in the United States

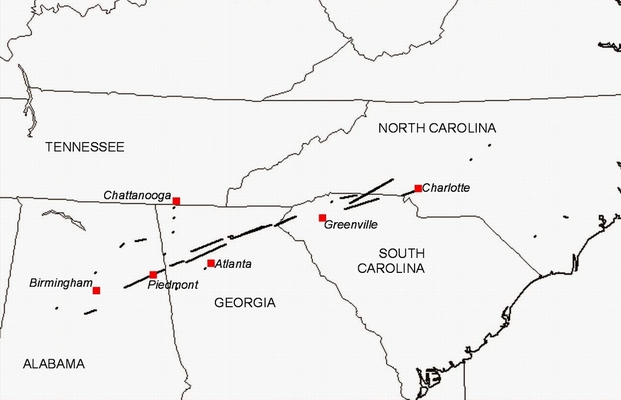
- A map of that day's tornado tracks

Meteorological history
- Duration: March 27, 1994

Tornado outbreak
- Tornadoes: 29
- Max. rating: F4 tornado
- Duration: 21 hours, 45 minutes
- Highest gusts: 104 mph (167 km/h) at Randolph AFB, Texas
- Largest hail: 4.5 in (11 cm)

Overall effects
- Fatalities: 40
- Injuries: 491
- Damage: $140 million (2005 USD)
- Areas affected: Southeastern United States
- Part of the tornado outbreaks of 1994

The 1994 Palm Sunday tornado outbreak was the third notable US tornado outbreak to occur on Palm Sunday and the second to take place in the Southeastern United States. The outbreak produced 29 tornadoes from Texas to North Carolina, killing 40 people and injuring 491, and causing $140 million in damage. The deadliest storm of the outbreak, as well as in the US in 1994, was an F4 tornado that devastated Piedmont, Alabama. It struck the Goshen United Methodist Church right in the middle of the Palm Sunday service, collapsing the roof on the congregation and killing 20 people inside, including the Rev. Kelly Clem's 4-year-old daughter Hannah. Two other houses of worship were also destroyed mid-service. The supercell that formed this tornado tracked for 200 miles (322 km) to South Carolina.

== Meteorological synopsis ==
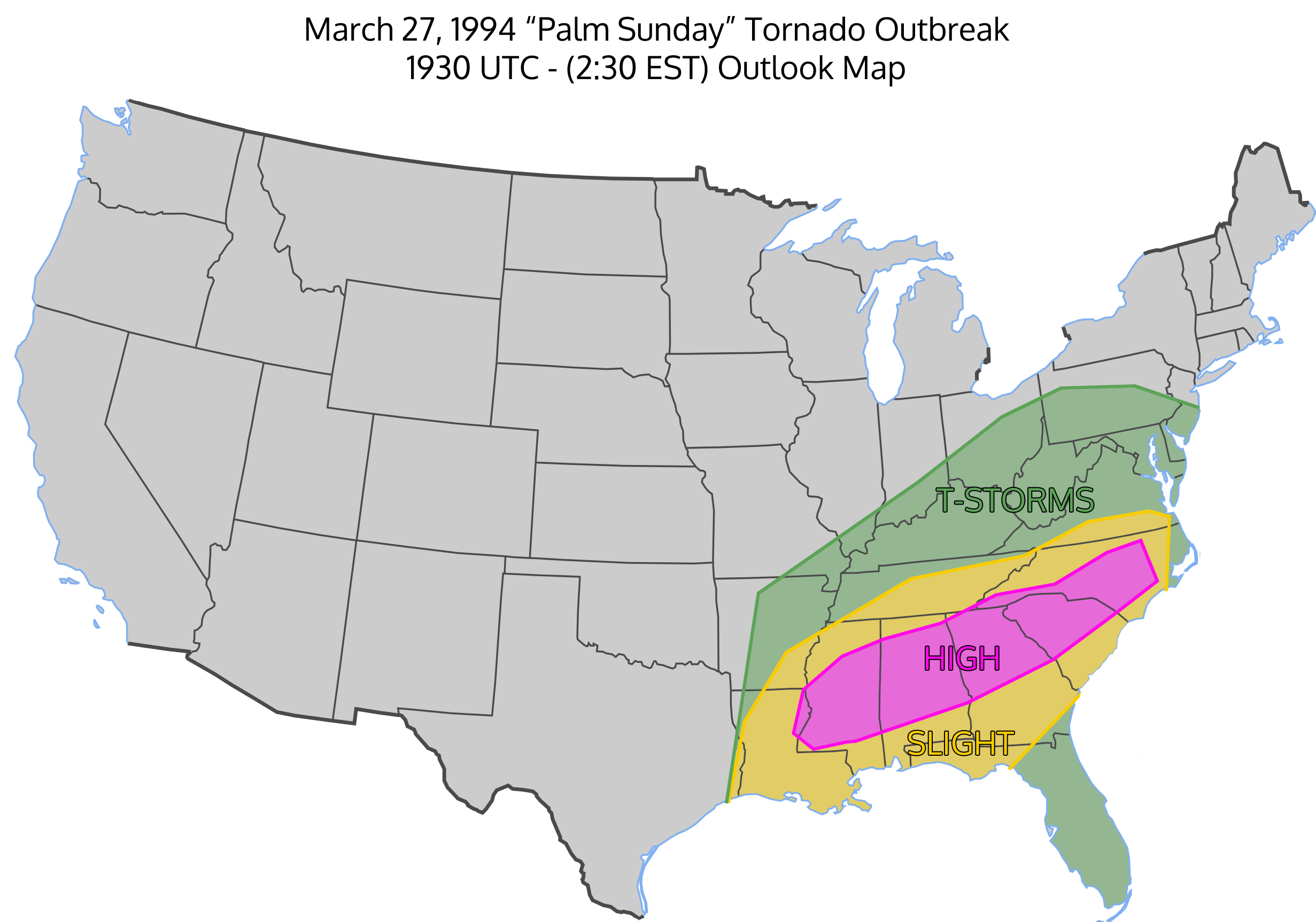
Day 1 outlook at 1930 UTC showing a high risk.

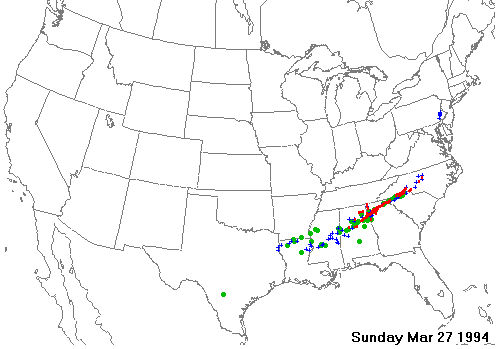
Storm reports from the March 27, 1994 event.

The SPC started forecasting the outbreak on March 26, highlighting the risk of severe thunderstorms over the area that would eventually be impacted. They issued a "severe" forecast for most of the Southern, and some of the Mid-Atlantic states, forecasting "the potential for supercell storms, along with the possibility of tornadoes."

By the morning of March 27, it was apparent that a very strong and potent airmass had set up over the Gulf states, with the SPC issuing a moderate risk for most of Alabama, the southern half of Mississippi, and most of Louisiana in their morning outlook. The 6 AM CST (1200 UTC) 500 mb analysis showed a strong southwest flow of near 80 knots over the Southern U.S., while at the 850 MB level, there existed winds of near 50 knots coming out of the state of Louisiana. At the surface, temperatures in Alabama, Mississippi, and Georgia were in the low 70's Fahrenheit, with dewpoints were in the upper 60's to low 70's. CAPE values at Centreville, Alabama were nearing 1,200 J/kg with no cap to speak of. A surface front left by rain during the previous evening was situated over northern parts of Alabama, Mississippi, and Georgia.

By 9 AM CST (1500 UTC), thunderstorms and severe weather were not only occurring along the boundary setup by the rain from the previous evening in the northern portions of Alabama and Mississippi, but further to the south as well. At 9:18 AM CST (1518 UTC), the SPC issued a tornado watch for Eastern Mississippi and Northern Alabama. The storms then rapidly intensified, with tornado warnings being issued by the Birmingham and Huntsville NWS offices before 11 AM local time. Both the deadly F4 tornado that struck the Goshen United Methodist Church in Cherokee County and the Marshall County F2 twister formed at about this time. The SPC also issued a PDS Tornado Watch for all of Northern Georgia by 12 PM EST (1700 UTC), with the wording stating, "This is a particularly dangerous situation with the possibility of very damaging tornadoes. Also, large hail, dangerous lightning and damaging thunderstorm winds can be expected." Severe storms and tornadoes tracked into the northern Georgia region by 12:42 EST, and tornadoes continued to track across northern Georgia during the afternoon.

During the early-mid afternoon, analysis showed a very unstable airmass over the southern U.S., with CAPE values near 2,500 J/kg and SRH values of near 250 m^{2}/s^{2} at Jackson, Mississippi. The 1800 UTC Centreville, Alabama sounding showed similar conditions, with CAPE over 2,500 J/kg and SRH values of over 500 m^{2}/s^{2}. This resulted in an Energy Helicity Index (EHI) value of 8.49, which is strongly supportive of tornadic thunderstorms. Based on these soundings, the SPC issued a High Risk for their 1930 UTC outlook, noting a rapidly destabilized atmosphere and winds being much stronger than what was originally forecasted. Noting the presence of a shortwave trough that was tracking into Mississippi and Louisiana as well as rapidly falling pressures in advance of a frontal boundary, the SPC issued a tornado watch for eastern Louisiana and central Mississippi, however, there were no reported tornadoes in this region on March 27. The SPC, seeing that storms were tracking into the Carolinas, issued a tornado watch for portions of the western and central Carolinas, as well as the portion of northeast Georgia not already included in the prior tornado watch. Tornadoes continued to track along this area from the mid-late afternoon, with an F3 tornado striking parts of northeast Georgia and the upstate of South Carolina, injuring 12, and another tornado along the border region of North Carolina and South Carolina injuring 13.

In Alabama, tornadoes continued in the central part of the state during the mid-late afternoon. An F1 tornado struck parts of Tuscaloosa County just after 4 PM. Funnel clouds were seen in Hueytown as a storm went over Jefferson County at around 4:30 PM local time. An F2 tornado was produced in Shelby County at 5:30 CST, damaging a high school and a residential neighborhood before destroying two mobile home parks.

During the cleanup from the F4 tornado that struck Cherokee County, emergency responders had to take cover as another funnel cloud was spotted just before 6 PM CST. The storms also produced hail up to 3 in (7.6 cm) in diameter and winds around 60 mph (97 km/h). The storm system also left behind extensive flooding in Winston and Walker Counties, with $150,000 worth of damage done to roads and bridges in Walker County. The final tornado of the outbreak was reported just before midnight in Greenville County in South Carolina. The National Weather Service offices in Birmingham, Atlanta, and Athens did not stop issuing warnings until late at night on the 27th or early in the morning on the 28th, issuing 75 tornado warnings and 182 severe weather products overall.

Overall, the outbreak of March 27, 1994 was not as synoptically evident as some of the past outbreaks that have occurred, as there was no deep surface low or trough present for forcing in the area where the storms occurred, and many of the ingredients necessary that were the cause of this outbreak were not able to be forecasted until the morning of the event.

== Confirmed tornadoes ==
Confirmed tornadoes by Fujita rating
FU	F0	F1	F2	F3	F4	F5	Total
0	10	6	4	7	2	0	29

=== March 27 event ===
List of reported tornadoes – Sunday, March 27, 1994
F#	Location	County	Time (UTC)	Path length	Damage
Texas
F0	NW of Mineral Wells	Palo Pinto	0705	0.1 miles (0.16 km)	Brief touchdown reported by storm chasers with no damage.
Alabama
F4	SSW of Ragland to NE of Rock Run	St. Clair, Calhoun, Cherokee	1655	50 miles (80 km)	22 deaths — See section on this tornado
F2	S of Guntersville	Marshall	1702	6 miles (9.7 km)	A tornado damaged 103 homes just south of Guntersville and later passed near Lake Guntersville State Park. It also partially destroyed the roof of a nursing home. 30 people were injured.
F3	Rainsville/Sylvania to Henagar	DeKalb	1732	23 miles (37 km)	This tornado was initially rated F4 in Storm Data but then downgraded in a reassessment. It destroyed 16 homes, 13 mobile homes, two businesses, and 12 poultry houses. 20 people were injured.
F0	SW of Nectar	Blount	1757	2.5 miles (4.0 km)	Weak tornado damaged six homes, blew down electrical lines and trees, and destroyed three greenhouses.
F1	NE of Tuscaloosa	Tuscaloosa	2202	2 miles (3.2 km)	This tornado developed from reforming afternoon storms and hit unpopulated area near Lake Tuscaloosa, downing transmission towers.
F2	Helena to Pelham/Indian Springs	Shelby	2331	12 miles (19 km)	This tornado extensively damaged businesses and mobile homes and caused minor damage to a school in Pelham. It dissipated just west of Meadowbrook. Rating disputed, ranked F3 by Grazulis.
Georgia
F4	SE of Rome to ESE of Jasper	Floyd, Bartow, Cherokee, Pickens	1714	50 miles (80 km)	3 deaths — See section on this tornado
F0	N of Lafayette	Walker	1755	1.5 miles (2.4 km)	Weak tornado damaged some roofs and snapped trees along a discontinuous path.
F0	S of Lafayette	Walker	1755	1 mile (1.6 km)	Second tornado in the Lafayette area downed trees in uninhabited areas.
F1	Lookout Mountain	Walker	1815	1 mile (1.6 km)	Tornado "destroyed five single story mixed brick and wood homes" but only briefly touched down.
F3	NW of Dahlonega to NNE of Clarkesville	Dawson, Lumpkin, White, Habersham	1817	45 miles (72 km)	3 deaths – A long-tracked tornado descended to the ground about 7 miles (11 km) north-northwest of Dawsonville at 2:17 p.m. EST. The tornado initially downed power lines and trees as it produced F0 damage in rural locations, but grew in size and intensity as it entered Lumpkin County. Widening to 0.25 miles (0.40 km) wide, the tornado caused widespread F2 damage to hilly terrain as it snapped 60-to-80-foot (18 to 24 m) tall pine trees. Upon reaching an area near Gordon Seabolt Road, about 2.5 miles (4.0 km) west-northwest of Dahlonega, an elderly man was killed by flying debris. Soon the tornado passed just 1.5 miles (2.4 km) north of Dahlonega and later killed another elderly man in a mobile home 4 miles (6.4 km) northeast of Dahlonega. In this area, the tornado destroyed many "brick and wood" homes. Thereafter, the tornado crossed the northwest slope of Yonah Mountain and then attained its peak intensity, F3 on the Fujita scale, as it broadened to 1.25 miles (2.01 km) wide and caused severe damage to homes about 7 miles (11 km) northeast of Cleveland. There, it "completely leveled" 10 homes and badly damaged 25–30 others. The tornado then weakened to F2 strength and continued on to kill a person in a mobile home 6 miles (9.7 km) north of Clarkesville. It maintained intensity through rugged terrain until it lifted 6.5 miles (10.5 km) northeast of Clarkesville at 3:02 p.m. EST. Along its path, the tornado caused over $17 million in property damage, killed three people and more than 500,000 chickens, and snapped "hundreds of thousands" of trees.
F0	W of Rome	Floyd	1830	3 miles (4.8 km)	Tornado hit just north of Coosa and felled many trees along its brief path.
F3	S of Adairsville to NE of Jasper	Bartow, Gordon, Cherokee, Pickens	1901	40 miles (64 km)	9 deaths – The second-deadliest tornado in the entire outbreak—and the deadliest of the outbreak in Georgia—touched down about 4.5 miles (7.2 km) south of Adairsville in Bartow County at 3:01 p.m. EST. Proceeding to the northeast, the tornado quickly strengthened to F2 intensity as it severely damaged five to seven homes and snapped trees in half. Tornado winds blew trees onto a truck, killing its occupant inside. Next, the tornado increased to F3 strength and widened to .75 miles (1.21 km) as it passed through Pleasant Valley. There, the tornado threw a 4,000-pound (1.8 t) pickup truck for 300 yards (0.17 mi) and destroyed or heavily damaged 25–30 homes of brick or wood construction. The tornado was reported to be so large and fast-moving that, like the 1925 Tri-State tornado, it was a "rotating fog bank" indistinguishable from the cloud base as it passed through Pleasant Valley. Afterward, the tornado retained F3 strength as it passed 1.5 miles (2.4 km) north of Funkhouser and heavily damaged three to five homes of brick or wood construction. It went on to destroy or damage four homes near the intersections of Bartow, Gordon, and Pickens Counties. Entering Pickens County, the tornado grew to 1.5 miles (2.4 km) wide, snapping most trees at their base, and killed six people in a trailer that was thrown 100 to 250 yards (300 to 750 ft). It then killed two more people as it destroyed a single-story residence and a mobile home before lifting 3 miles (4.8 km) northeast of Jasper. It caused a total of $12,250,000 in damage and killed a total of nine people along its path. At one point, according to engineer Timothy P. Marshall, the tornado moved at 60 miles per hour (97 km/h) and downed 1,000 trees each second. A second, weaker, F2 tornado overlapped part of the path of this tornado and hit Pleasant Valley just 30 minutes after this F3 tornado left.
F3	NW of Dahlonega to NE of Cleveland	Lumpkin, White	1923	22 miles (35 km)	3 deaths – The second of two F3 tornadoes to hit near Dahlonega touched down 3.5 miles (5.6 km) northwest of that town at 3:23 p.m. EST. Only a minute later, it intensified to F2 intensity and instantly killed two people in a mobile home that disintegrated. The tornado continued to intensify to F3 intensity as it caused a third and final death in a mobile home while snapping many large pines in rural areas north and northeast of Dahlonega. Then it fluctuated in intensity to F1 strength before passing 5 miles (8.0 km) north of Cleveland, causing significant damage to four businesses and ten homes. Soon after, it re-intensified into an F3 tornado as it passed just .25 miles (0.40 km) south of the earlier F3 tornado while badly damaging 20 homes and destroying 15 in a rural subdivision. It then lifted after striking the subdivision and causing $3.5 million in total damages. Overall the tornado killed three people.
F2	ESE of Adairsville	Bartow	1935	2 miles (3.2 km)	This tornado hit the same area that was damaged by the previous event and went through Pleasant Valley, but while only at F2 intensity. It destroyed or badly damaged five to seven homes in Pleasant Valley.
F0	NW of Dawsonville	Dawson	1942	4 miles (6.4 km)	Tornado uprooted several large trees.
F3	Tallulah Falls to Walhalla, South Carolina	Habersham, Rabun, Oconee (SC)	2004	30 miles (48 km)	This tornado badly damaged five buildings at Tallulah Falls before descending a 500-foot (152 m) cliff. It destroyed about 60 homes in Oconee County, South Carolina, with $5.5 million in damage there. It was part of the Piedmont, Alabama, tornado family as items from that town, more than 140 mi (225 km) to the southwest, were found at Tallulah Falls. The tornado was F2 at Tallulah Falls and F3 in South Carolina.
F3	NW of Cedartown to SE of Rome	Floyd	2301	20 miles (32 km)	See section on this tornado
F1	SE of Cave Spring to S of Rome	Floyd	2304	10 miles (16 km)	Badly damaged roofs of frail wood homes and either uprooted or broke pine trees in half.
F1	WNW of Bremen	Haralson	0035	2 miles (3.2 km)	Moderately damaged roofs and badly damaged a mobile home along with a chicken coop while uprooting or snapping trees.
F0	NW of Marietta	Cobb	0110	2 miles (3.2 km)	Produced minimal roof damage to three homes and downed trees. Dissipated near Lake Allatoona in suburban Atlanta.
South Carolina
F2	NE of Inman to SE of Chesnee to High Shoals, North Carolina, area	Spartanburg, Cherokee, Cleveland (NC), Gaston (NC)	2055	45 miles (72 km)	This long-tracked tornado destroyed two mobile homes, badly damaged another home, and ripped apart three transmission towers—all indicative of F2 damage—before crossing into North Carolina. Upon entering North Carolina, the tornado downed three high-voltage transmission towers about 15 miles (24 km) southwest of Shelby. Just 300 yd (900 ft) to the northeast of the transmission towers, the tornado destroyed a home along with a large barn house, plus three additional transmission towers, four mobile homes, two vehicles, and a cinder-block structure nearby. Nearing Boiling Springs, the still-F2 tornado struck Gardner–Webb University and damaged several vehicles that were parked on campus. Just afterward, it hit downtown Boiling Springs, destroying an apartment duplex, a flower shop, and a car-wash station. After leaving Boiling Springs, the tornado weakened to F1 intensity and leveled a greenhouse north of North Carolina Highway 150. It also blew down many trees before entering Shelby, damaging a church steeple and a billboard in town. Thence it intensified somewhat and badly damaged homes, trees, and power lines before passing 3 miles (4.8 km) south of Cherryville. As it passed near Cherryville, the F1 tornado caused a porch roof to collapse east of North Carolina Highway 274. It also broke trees and blew a roof off a barn. Farther along, the tornado also badly damaged three mobile homes. After crossing North Carolina Highway 279, the tornado finally dissipated as it approached the town of High Shoals in Gaston County.
F1	Spartanburg to Blacksburg	Spartanburg, Cherokee	2130	35 miles (56 km)	Tornado injured four people by falling trees and partially damaged roofs. Threw large tree branches onto homes and badly damaged a power substation. Numerous trees and power lines downed.
F1	S of Landrum to NW of Chesnee	Greenville, Spartanburg	2140	19 miles (31 km)	Tornado caused minimal F1 damage to roofs, outbuildings, trees, and power lines. Formed from the same supercell that produced the Tallulah Falls–Walhalla tornado.
F3	NE of Clover to Lake Wylie to Charlotte, North Carolina	York, Gaston (NC), Mecklenburg (NC)	2327	18 miles (29 km)	This tornado produced F1 damage in South Carolina, destroying a mobile home and an outbuilding; it also damaged many other mobile homes and outbuildings in Lake Wylie. After crossing into North Carolina, it destroyed a brick home and three mobile homes before striking the Catawba River. Next, the tornado struck Charlotte Douglas International Airport, where an Air National Guard building lost its roof. Many vehicles and a DC-9 aircraft sustained damage as well. Two people were injured. The tornado then struck apartments and homes, several of which lost three-story walls and had roof damage. Nearby, the tornado ripped steel poles at a restaurant from their concrete foundations, downed large trees, and caused significant damage to an elementary school before lifting just north of downtown Charlotte. At least two, and possibly nine, people were injured along the path.
F0	Tigerville	Greenville	0450	0.5 miles (0.80 km)	Weak tornado displaced a garage roof, threw a boat, downed a large oak, and caused other negligible damage near the North Greenville University campus.
North Carolina
F0	NE of Liberty	Alamance	0040	0.5 miles (0.80 km)	Brief touchdown in sparsely populated area.
F0	Asheboro	Randolph	0100	0.5 miles (0.80 km)	Brief touchdown at the southeastern edge of Asheboro, with little damage.
Sources: Tornado History Project Data for March 27, 1994, SPC Storm Data

=== Ragland–Piedmont–Rock Run, Alabama ===
Ragland–Piedmont–Rock Run, Alabama
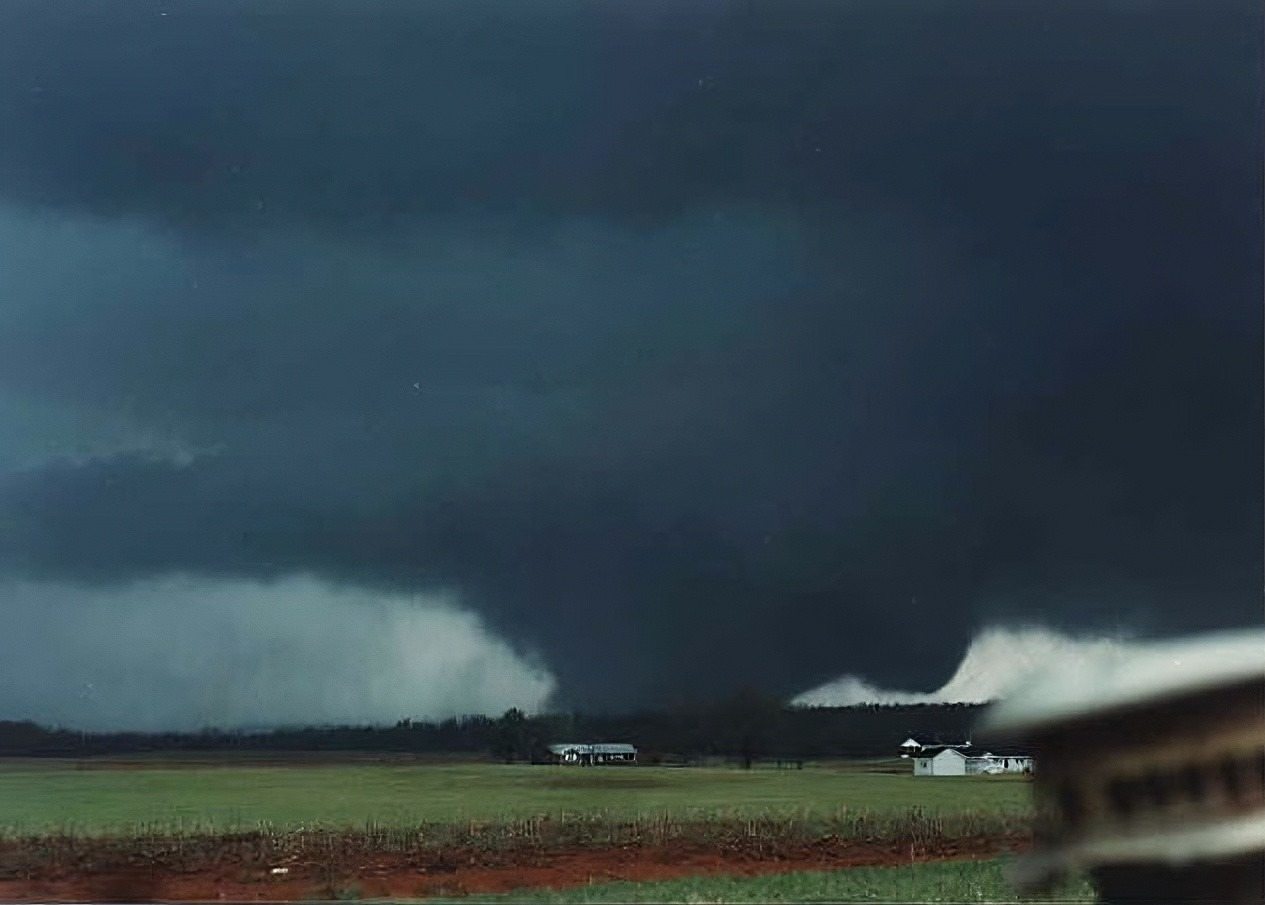
- The tornado seen north of Piedmont, Alabama

Meteorological history
- Date: March 27, 1994, 10:55 a.m. CDT (UTC−05:00)
- Dissipated: March 27, 1994, 11:52 a.m. CDT (UTC−05:00)
- Duration: 57 minutes

F4 tornado
- on the Fujita scale
- Highest winds: 207–260 mph (333–418 km/h)

Overall effects
- Fatalities: 22
- Injuries: 150
- Damage: $50.5 million (1994 USD)

This violent and deadly tornado developed 1 mile (1.6 km) south-southwest of Ragland in St. Clair County, Alabama, at 10:55 a.m. CST. With a 45-to-55-mile-per-hour (72 to 89 km/h) forward speed, the tornado first destroyed buildings east of Ragland before killing a woman on a campground west of Neely Henry Lake. Just prior to entering Calhoun County, the tornado destroyed 18 homes and 20 mobile homes. Upon crossing the north side of Ohatchee, the tornado threw a van into a ditch, killing a man inside and injuring three other occupants. After causing the death on U.S. Route 431, it passed through sparsely populated, wooded land about 4 to 5 miles (6.4 to 8.0 km) west-northwest of Piedmont. As it passed north of Piedmont, the tornado struck the Goshen United Methodist Church in the former community of Goshen, killing 20 people in the church and injuring 92; some sources say 90 were injured. The tornado also destroyed two nearby churches, but killed no one in their congregations. Parishioners in the Goshen United Methodist Church apparently received no warning while attending services and some were crushed to death as the walls and roof collapsed upon them. An inflow jet caused the south wall—which, being 18 feet (5.5 m) tall and 60 feet (18 m) wide, was built solely of masonry block—to collapse inward, so the timber-and-steel gable roof and other walls followed suit, crushing parishioners inside the sanctuary. After striking the church, the tornado continued on and later dissipated 5 miles (8.0 km) northeast of Rock Run, near the Alabama–Georgia state line. Overall, the tornado killed 22 people.

=== Rome–Canton–Jasper, Georgia ===
Rome–Canton–Jasper, Georgia
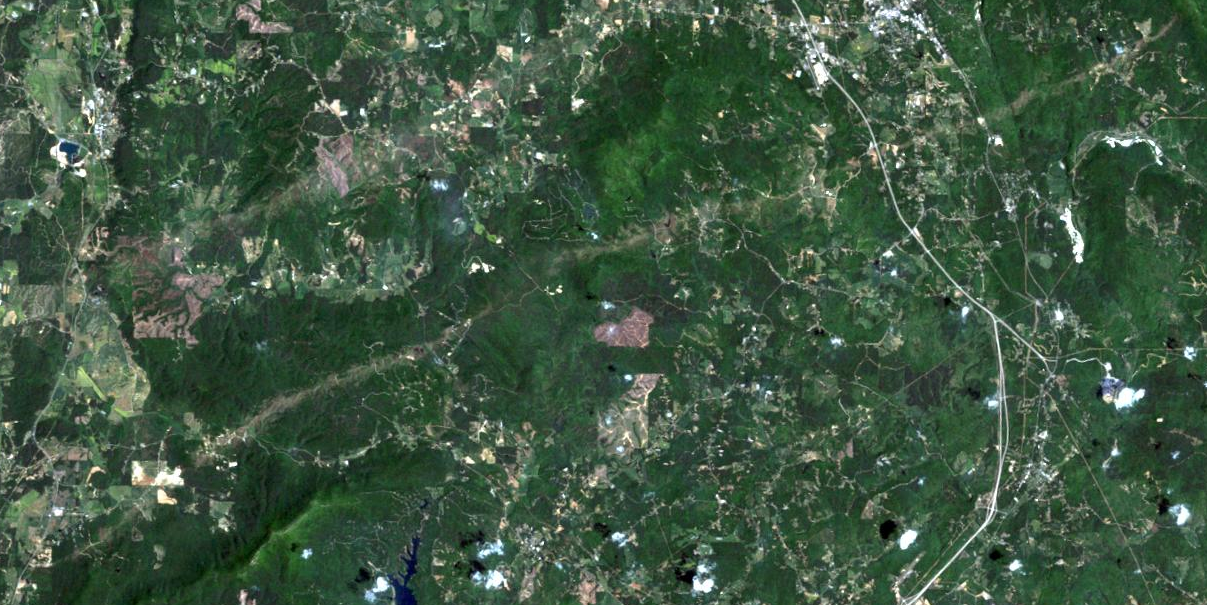
- The scar left behind by the tornado in rural Cherokee and Pickens County.

Meteorological history
- Formed: March 27, 1994 , 1:14 pm. CDT (UTC−05:00)
- Dissipated: March 27, 1994 , 2:03 pm. CDT (UTC−05:00)
- Duration: 49 minutes

F4 tornado
- on the Fujita scale
- Highest winds: 207–260 mph (333–418 km/h)

Overall effects
- Fatalities: 3
- Damage: ~$7 million (1994 USD)

The second violent tornado of the outbreak developed in a rural area of Floyd County, Georgia, about 9 miles (14 km) southeast of Rome, at 1:14 p.m. EST. Upon touching down, the .125-mile (0.201 km) wide tornado uprooted large pines and oaks while causing F0 damage to five or six homes of "mixed brick and wood construction." The tornado then moved northeast as it snapped trees before intensifying to F1 strength about 10 miles (16 km) west of Cartersville. During this, the tornado initially shrunk to .06 miles (0.097 km) wide, but then widened again to .125 miles (0.201 km) as it passed through Cassville, with F1 damage primarily to the roofs of 10–15 homes. The tornado blew down 20 large trees and damaged power lines in Cassville.

Thereafter, the tornado increased greatly in size and intensity as it passed between White and Rydal, with the first and only F4 damage occurring in a rural area 15 miles (24 km) northwest of Canton. There, the 0.38-mile (0.61 km) wide tornado leveled "five two-story brick and wood homes" to the ground in the Indian Springs subdivision. The tornado also severely damaged eight to 10 other homes and slightly damaged 12–15. Overall, the tornado was most destructive at Indian Springs and soon weakened as it continued northeast through wooded lands; however, its path briefly widened. It killed two people in a trailer along Georgia State Route 140 in Bartow County and snapped 80-to-90-foot (24 to 27 m) tall pine trees nearby. Though the 1-mile (1.6 km) wide tornado impacted forested areas, it still caused major damage to 10 mobile homes and six permanent homes, as well as damage to four unspecified vehicles.

Henceforth, the tornado continued to weaken to F2 intensity and contracted to .75 miles (1.21 km) wide as it passed into Pickens County, severely damaging 10–15 chicken coops along with 20–25 homes of brick and wood construction. It killed one more person in a trailer before lifting from the ground about 6 miles (9.7 km) east-southeast of Jasper. Ultimately, it caused almost $7 million (1994 USD) in losses to properties and businesses in Bartow County alone, with another $1.5 million in losses in adjourning Pickens County. The tornado killed three people and over 500,000 chickens along its track and leveled "thousands" of trees, with over $10 million in losses to agricultural interests.

=== Cave Spring–Lindale, Georgia ===
Cave Spring–Lindale, Georgia
Meteorological history
- Formed: March 27, 1994 , 7:00 p.m. CDT (UTC−05:00)
- Dissipated: March 27, 1994 , 7:40 p.m. CDT (UTC−05:00)
- Duration: 40 minutes

F3 tornado
- on the Fujita scale
- Highest winds: 158–206 mph (254–332 km/h)

Overall effects
- Damage: $6.75 million (1994 USD)

The sixth and final F3+ tornado to hit Georgia on March 27 touched down 8 miles (13 km) northwest of Cedartown at about 7:00 p.m. EST. Though mainly impacting rural areas at first, it badly damaged four wood homes and blew down many trees with resultant F1 damage. The tornado appeared reddish to eyewitnesses as it passed through rugged terrain. As it crossed near SR 100, the tornado produced major roof damage to a few homes and destroyed a pair of chicken coops. Widening to 0.5 miles (0.80 km) wide, the tornado acquired a multiple vortex structure as residents observed two or three funnels rotating around the main vortex. In southern Floyd County, about 2 miles (3.2 km) east of Cave Spring, the multiple-vortex tornado snapped trees in half and badly damaged five double-wide mobile homes along with three or four frail wood homes.

Afterward, the tornado strengthened to F2 intensity, causing more severe damage to wood homes, but soon contracted in size to .25 miles (0.40 km) wide and weakened into an F1 tornado. However, as it neared to within 2.5 miles (4.0 km) southwest of Lindale, it widened yet again and rapidly strengthened into an F3 tornado as it passed through Leawood Estates. There, it reportedly leveled "fifteen mixed single and two story mixed brick and wood homes of poor construction," along with some homes that were being built. The tornado caused 30 injuries, including one of a man who was thrown 1,000 yards (0.57 mi) into the street across from his home. Residents reported continuous lightning preceding and during the passage of the tornado and were alerted by their dogs barking. Some residents also reported a smaller tornado south of the primary one.

After hitting Leawood Estates at maximum intensity, the tornado weakened back into an F2 tornado and shrunk to .25 miles (0.40 km) wide as it passed 6 miles (9.7 km) south of Rome. There, it badly damaged three poorly built wood homes, destroyed four mobile homes, and uprooted large trees. Farther along, it decreased in size to just .125 miles (0.201 km) wide but caused significant damage to 15–20 homes of brick and wood construction. As it passed 7.2 miles (11.6 km) southeast of Rome, the tornado degenerated into an F0 tornado over wooded farmland while causing major roof damage to a few homes before dissipating. According to the National Weather Service, the tornado destroyed 55–60 homes and did at least some damage to 140–150 others, with total losses reaching $6,750,000.

== Effects on National Safety ==
The deaths at Goshen United Methodist Church brought to light the deficiencies in the NOAA Weather Radio network across the United States and the lack of NOAA Weather Radio use in many public spaces. Budget cuts in the 1970s had forced the National Weather Service to cut back on the expansion of new broadcast stations. Most urban and suburban areas in the country had sufficient coverage, but many rural areas had no coverage at all. After a visit to the Goshen site, then Vice President Al Gore pushed for further funding and expansion of the NOAA Weather Radio system, especially in rural areas. This was accomplished through an expansion of private-public partnerships, primarily by the National Weather Service leasing or using donated tower space from entities such as TV stations, public utilities, and state government agencies. Gore, also, pushed for facilities such as schools, hospitals, churches, and nursing homes to have weather radios on hand.

== See also ==
- 1920 Palm Sunday tornado outbreak
- 1965 Palm Sunday tornado outbreak
- 2020 Easter tornado outbreak
- Tornado outbreak sequence of March 24–28, 2021

== Further information ==
- Nicholas, Stein (2006). Anatomy of a Tornado (TV broadcast). National Geographic Channel.
