= Tornadoes of 1928 =

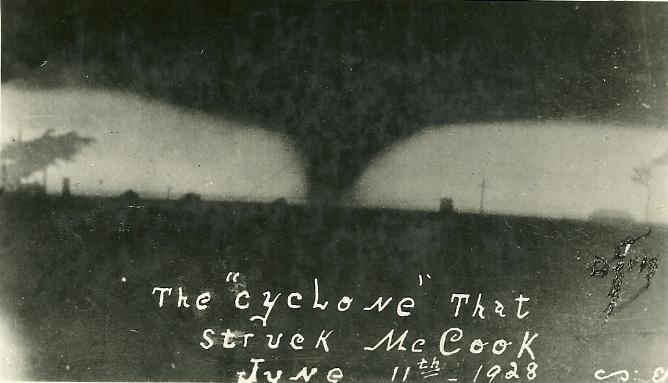
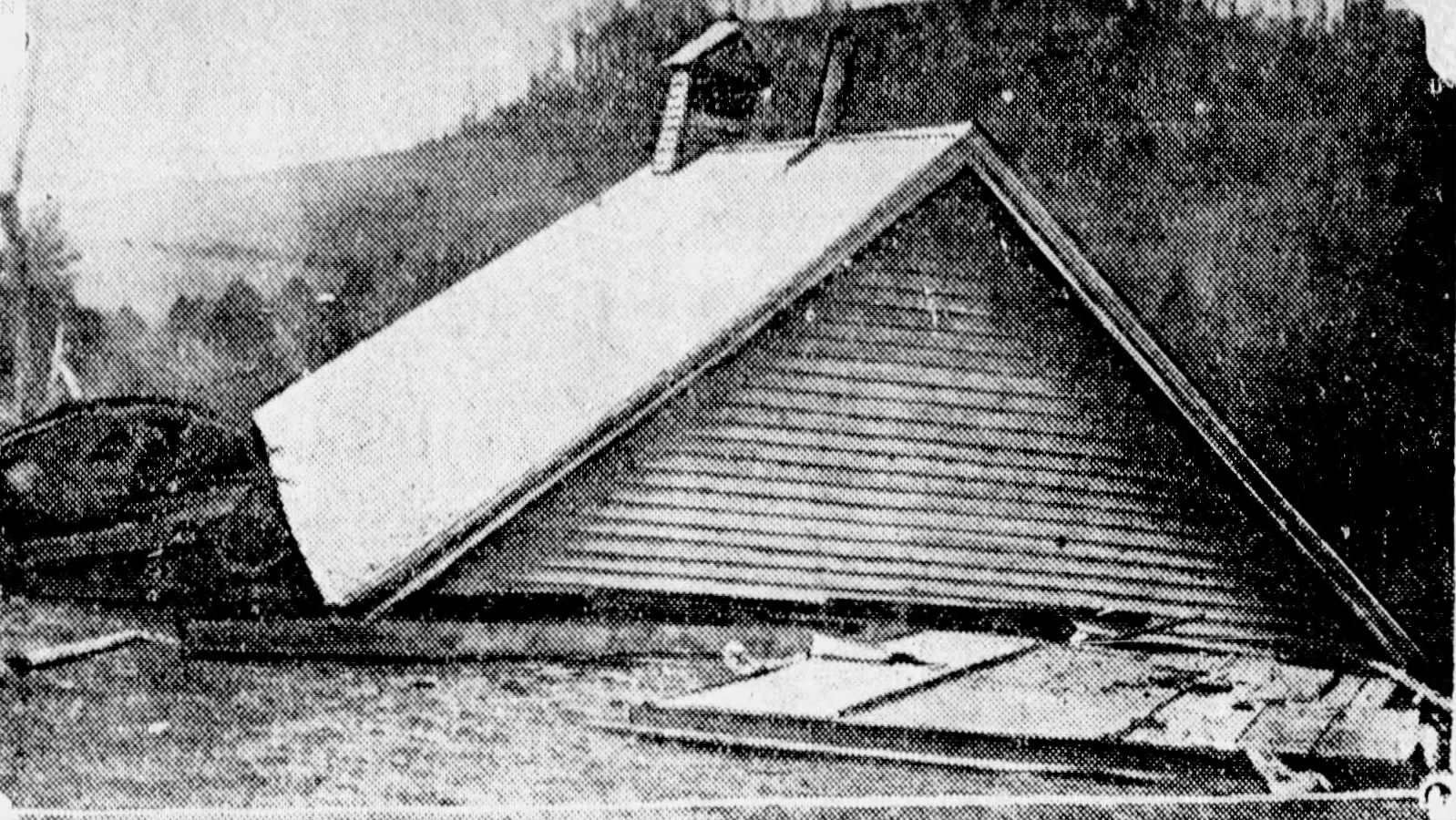
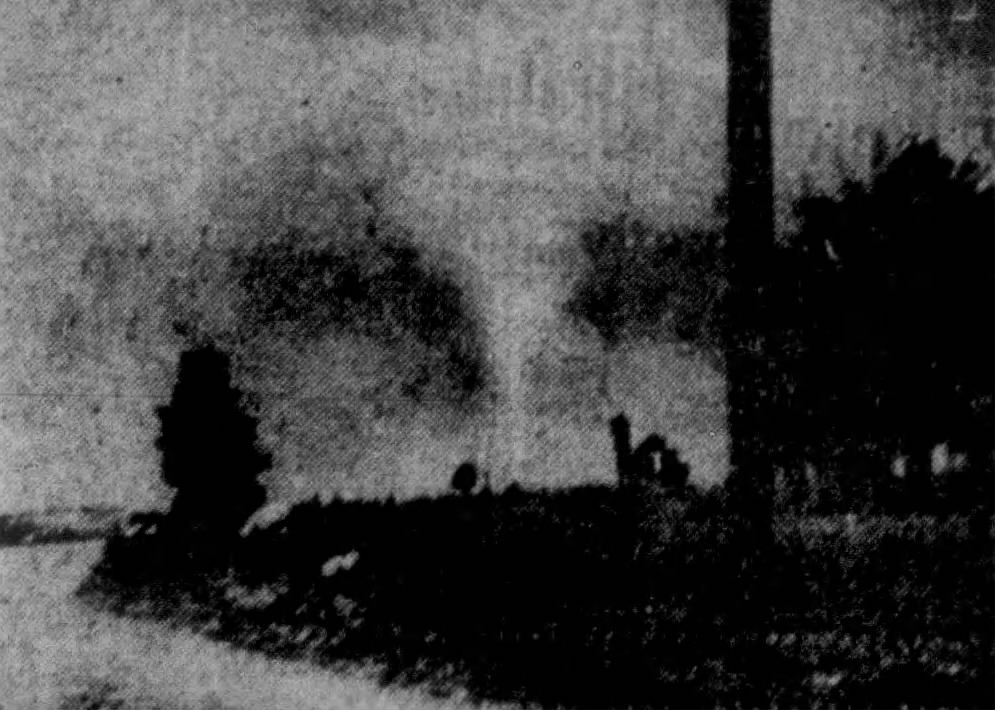
- Timespan: January 1 - December 31, 1928
- Maximum rated tornado: F4 tornado: Rockford, Illinois on September 14; Hostrup, Denmark on November 24
- Tornadoes in U.S.: ≥162
- Fatalities (U.S.): ≥94
- Fatalities (worldwide): ≥130

This page documents notable tornadoes and tornado outbreaks worldwide in 1928. Strong and destructive tornadoes form most frequently in the United States, Argentina, Southern Brazil, the Bengal region and China, but can occur almost anywhere under the right conditions. Tornadoes also develop occasionally in southern Canada during summer in the Northern Hemisphere and somewhat regularly at other times of the year across Europe, South Africa, Japan, Australia and New Zealand. Tornadic events are often accompanied by other forms of severe weather, including thunderstorms, strong winds and hail.

All documented significant tornadoes prior to 1950 in the United States were given unofficial ratings by tornado experts like Thomas P. Grazulis, which this article uses for the ratings below. Most of these records are limited to significant tornadoes; those rated F2 or higher on the Fujita scale, or which caused a fatality. Some events listed by Grazulis were likely tornado families rather than single tornadoes. There are also no official tornado counts for each month, so not every month is included in this article. In subsequent years, the documentation of tornadoes became much more widespread and efficient, with the average annual tornado count being around 1,253. Outside the United States, various meteorological organizations, like the European Severe Storms Laboratory rated tornadoes, which are considered official ratings.

== January ==
=== January 19 ===
Three tornadoes touched down across the lower Ohio River Valley during the early morning hours. Two tornadoes struck the outskirts of Louisville, Kentucky, with the first and more intense of the two tornadoes touching down 1 mile southwest of Shivley, Kentucky. The tornado moved east-northeast, un-roofing around 100 homes until reaching Anchorage, Kentucky, where the tornado lifted after tracking around 18 miles and injuring 17 people. The second tornado touched down around 12 miles east of where the first tornado formed, near the community of Fern Creek, and tracked parallel to the first tornado. The tornado destroyed one barn while damaging a few others before lifting near Jeffersonton, Kentucky after tracking for around 4 miles and causing no injuries or fatalities. Grazulis rated both tornadoes as F2.

The third, and strongest of the tornadoes touched down 1 mile west of Abbe Observatory in Cincinnati, Ohio at 9:07 a.m EST. The tornado moved northeast, having a path with ranging from 200 to 500 ft wide. Outside of toppled chimneys, all of the tornadoes destruction occurred around 200 ft east of Colerain Avenue, with two homes being un-roofed and one being left with only a few interior walls. Multiple eyewitnesses reported the tornado being surrounded by debris and balls of fire. However the latter appeared to be due to fallen electrical wires. The tornado tracked only around 1,000 ft, injured 18 people, and caused roughly $100,000 USD (1928) in damages. Grazulis rated the tornado as F3.

=== January 24 ===
A deadly tornado touched down near Smithville, Tennessee at around 2:00 p.m. CST. Eyewitnesses reported the tornado as having a black funnel as the tornado swept through Holmes Creek Hallow. The tornado struck a school house with 21 students and a teacher inside, resulting in the school being blown over. The tornado killed 4 of the students while injuring an additional 6 people, including the teacher. The tornado continued east-northeast before lifting shortly after. Grazulis rated the tornado as F1.

== June ==
=== June 30 ===
The 1928 Johnstown tornado for the region killed two people and destroyed several farmhouses. It is remembered for a motorcyclist who rode from farm to farm to warn residents, likely saving many lives.

== August ==
=== August 5 (Germany) ===
A tornado outbreak tore across northern Bavaria, Germany resulting in widespread damage and producing three tornadoes. An F2 tornado impacted downtown Bamberg, completely destroying the Volkspark festival hall and trees were uprooted near the Bavarian Air Sports. According to a newspaper; no house in the city remained undamaged and the destruction was catastrophic. Severe thunderstorms from the event were also accompanied by large hail and torrential rainfall.

=== August 27 ===
A tornado touched down near Claresholm, Alberta resulting in widespread damage to nearby farms and structures. Several animals died in the tornado.

=== August 29 ===
The 1928 Monza tornado struck the city of Monza, killing 8 people and injuring about 60 others.

== September ==
=== September 13–14 ===
September 1928 Upper Plains-Midwest tornado outbreak was the most intense September outbreak in US history. Several violent tornadoes, including one F4 that hit Rockford, Illinois. (15 significant, 3 violent, 3 killer)

=== September 14 ===
The 1928 Rockford tornado moved through the city of Rockford, located in the U.S. state of Illinois.

== November ==
=== November 24 (Denmark) ===
On November 24, 1928, an F4 tornado hit the villages of Hostrup and Alslev, along a 6.8 km long path, between Esbjerg and Varde, Denmark. The tornado erased a farmhouse to the ground, partially destroyed an assembly hall and deroofed several other homes. A pump was ripped off the ground and thrown 10 meters. At least 3 people were injured.
