= National Register of Historic Places listings in McCurtain County, Oklahoma =

Location of McCurtain County in Oklahoma

This is a list of the National Register of Historic Places listings in McCurtain County, Oklahoma.

This is intended to be a complete list of the properties and districts on the National Register of Historic Places in McCurtain County, Oklahoma, United States. The locations of National Register properties and districts for which the latitude and longitude coordinates are included below, may be seen in a map.

There are 16 properties and districts listed on the National Register in the county, including 1 National Historic Landmark.

This National Park Service list is complete through NPS recent listings posted August 28, 2026.

== Current listings ==
	Name on the Register	Image	Date listed	Location	City or town	Description
1	Barnes-Stevenson House	Barnes-Stevenson House	November 17, 1978 (#78003083)	302 Adams St., SE. 33°53′38″N 94°49′23″W	Idabel	
2	Grobin Davis Mound Group		November 23, 1984 (#84002637)	Address Restricted	Wright City	
3	Frisco Station	Frisco Station	May 21, 1979 (#79003137)	Texas Ave. 33°53′39″N 94°49′45″W	Idabel	
4	Jefferson Gardner House		April 4, 1975 (#75002068)	3 miles west of Eagletown off U.S. Route 70; 34°02′47″N 94°37′24″W	Eagletown	
5	Garvin Rock Church		June 16, 1980 (#80003275)	Love and Williams Sts. 33°57′19″N 94°56′25″W	Garvin	Destroyed
6	Harkey Site		December 19, 1978 (#78003084)	Address Restricted	Idabel	
7	Harris House		September 1, 1978 (#78003082)	6 miles (9.6 km.) south of Haworth; 33°46′06″N 94°41′00″W	Haworth	
8	Idabel Armory	Idabel Armory	September 8, 1988 (#88001409)	Washington St. and SE. Ave. F 33°53′43″N 94°49′16″W	Idabel	
9	Pine Creek Mound Group		January 21, 1974 (#74002194)	Address Restricted	Bethel	
10	Rouleau Hotel	Rouleau Hotel	September 14, 2002 (#02000974)	20 E. Main St. 33°53′44″N 94°49′37″W	Idabel	
11	Spaulding-Olive House	Spaulding-Olive House	September 28, 1979 (#79003138)	601 Adams, SE. 33°53′39″N 94°49′09″W	Idabel	
12	Tiner School		November 21, 1980 (#80003274)	East of Broken Bow; 34°02′24″N 94°38′03″W	Broken Bow	
13	Valliant School Gymnasium-Auditorium		September 8, 1988 (#88001410)	Wilbor and Lucas Sts. 34°00′15″N 95°05′16″W	Valliant	
14	Waterhole Cemetery		December 11, 1979 (#79002001)	Iron Stob Road/N4550 South of Garvin; 33°59′25″N 94°59′24″W	Garvin	
15	Wheelock Academy		October 15, 1966 (#66000949)	East of Millerton on U.S. Route 70; 33°59′38″N 94°59′18″W	Millerton	
16	Wheelock Church		November 9, 1972 (#72001464)	2 miles northeast of Millerton; 33°59′26″N 94°59′25″W	Millerton	

== See also ==
- List of National Historic Landmarks in Oklahoma
- National Register of Historic Places listings in Oklahoma
