= Frisco =

Frisco may refer to:

== Places in the United States ==
- Frisco, Alabama, an unincorporated community
- San Francisco, California, as a nickname
- Frisco, Colorado, a home rule municipality
  - Frisco Historic Park – see Frisco Schoolhouse
- Frisco, Idaho, a ghost town
- Frisco, Illinois, an unincorporated community
- Frisco, Louisiana, an unincorporated community
- Frisco, Missouri, an unincorporated community
- Frisco, North Carolina, an unincorporated community
- Frisco, Pennsylvania, an unincorporated community
- Frisco, Texas, a city
- Frisco, Utah, a ghost town
- Frisco Lake, Missouri
- Frisco Mountain, Washington
- Frisco Peak, Utah

== Railroad-related ==
- Frisco Bridge, a rail bridge between West Memphis, Arkansas and Memphis, Tennessee
- St. Louis–San Francisco Railway (1876–1980), also known as "the Frisco"
  - St. Louis and San Francisco Railway Depot (Fayetteville, Arkansas), or Frisco Depot
  - Idabel station, a railway station in Idabel, Oklahoma, called Frisco Station on the National Register of Historic Places
  - Frisco Depot (disambiguation), other stations on the line
- Frisco Station, Texas, a mixed-use development in Frisco, Texas

== People ==
- Frisco (rapper), English Grime MC Deshane Cornwall (born 1982)
- Joe Frisco, American vaudeville performer Louis Wilson Joseph (1889–1958)
- Rocky Frisco (1937–2015), stage name of Don Roscoe Joseph III, pianist with the JJ Cale Band

== Other uses ==
- Frisco (drink), a flavoured malt drink sold in Lithuania, Slovakia and the Czech Republic
- Frisco Building, St. Louis, Missouri, on the National Register of Historic Places
- Frisco High School, Frisco, Texas
- Frisco Jones (of Frisco Jones and Felicia Cummings), a character on the soap opera General Hospital
- Frisco League, a high school athletic conference in Missouri
- Hardee's Frisco 250, the name of the ToyotaCare 250 NASCAR Xfinity Series race in 1994
- San Francisco del Monte, Quezon City, Philippines, also referred to as "Frisco"
- Frisco Independent School District Frisco, Texas Schools

== See also ==
- Frisco City, Alabama, a town
