= Frisco Depot =

Frisco Depot or Frisco Station may refer to one of several depot or stations of the former St. Louis and San Francisco Railway (also known as the Frisco Lines).

- Fayetteville station (St. Louis–San Francisco Railway) in Fayetteville, Arkansas
- St. Louis-San Francisco Railroad Depot (Poplar Bluff, Missouri)
- Antlers Frisco Depot and Antlers Spring in Antler, Oklahoma
- Idabel station in Oklahoma
- St. Louis and San Francisco Railway Depot (Comanche, Texas)

== Other uses ==
- Frisco Station, Texas is a mixed use development in Frisco, Texas
- "Frisco Depot", a song by Mickey Newbury on his 1971 album Frisco Mabel Joy.
