= Oklahoma State Highway 98 =

Highway in Oklahoma

State Highway 98

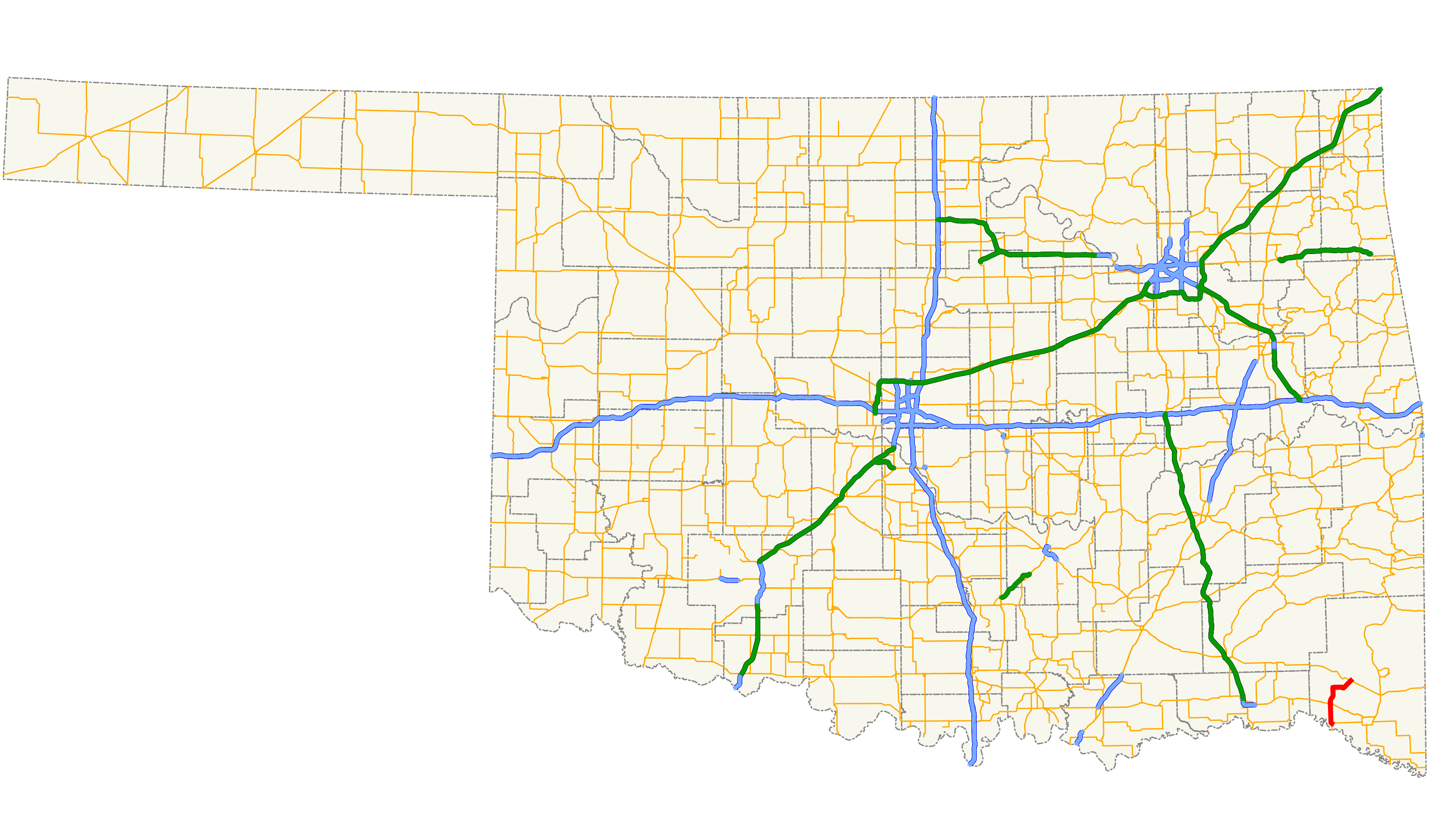

Route information
- Maintained by ODOT
- Length: 19.67 mi (31.66 km)
- Existed: ca. 1953–present

Major junctions
- South end: SH-37 north of Albion, Texas
- US 70 near Millerton
- North end: SH-3 near Glover

Location
- Country: United States
- State: Oklahoma

Highway system
- Oklahoma State Highway System; Interstate; US; State; Turnpikes
← SH-97	→ SH-99

State Highway 98, also abbreviated to SH-98 or OK-98, is a highway maintained by the U.S. state of Oklahoma. It travels for 19.67 miles (31.66 km) through McCurtain County It has one unsigned spur route, SH-98S.

SH-98 began as a short spur from US-70 to Wright City in 1953. In 1958, it was extended to its present extent, although the routing north of US-70 differed from that of the present day. By 1982, the highway had taken on its current routing and termini.

== Route description ==
SH-98 begins at the eastern SH-37 about 2 miles (3.2 km) north of the Red River (the Texas state line) and 10 miles (16 km) west of Idabel. The highway eventually heads northwest, but soon swings back around to head northward. The road continues due north on an arrow-straight course through the level terrain of the Whitegrass Flats. SH-98 intersects US-70 between Valliant and Millerton.

Highway 98 curves to the northeast, north of US-70. It then returns to a due north course, crossing the Little River. About 7 miles (11 km) north of US-70, it makes a sharp turn to the east. The highway skirts the north edge of Wright City, and SH-98S (see below) spurs off to serve the center of the town. SH-98 continues eastward, headed toward Glover, until turning northeast to meet SH-3, where it has its northern terminus.

== History ==
SH-98 first appeared on the 1954 official state highway map, implying that it was commissioned sometime in 1953. Originally, the highway began at US-70 and extended north to Wright City, where it ended; the route was effectively a spur to the town from US-70 and intersected no other highways. The route remained with this extent throughout much of the 1950s. In 1958, the road was extended in both directions—to the north, it headed due north from Wright City to end at SH-3 several miles further west than its present-day terminus, and to the south, where it followed a short section of SH-70 to link up with its present-day route and ending at its current terminus at SH-37. The route was realigned between Wright City and US-70 in 1960, shifting SH-98 further west to begin its US-70 concurrency in Valliant.

SH-98 was returned to a straighter alignment in 1975, eliminating the concurrency with US-70 and bypassing Valliant. The final major change to SH-98 occurred in 1982, when the road north of Wright City was removed from the highway system and SH-98 extended east toward Glover. This set the road at its present-day northern terminus.

== SH-98S ==
State Highway 98S
- Location: Wright City, Oklahoma
- Length: 0.10 mi (160 m)
- Existed: 1964–present

SH-98 has one spur highway, SH-98S. It is a 0.10 miles (0.16 km) connector highway to Wright City, but is now unsigned. However, as of 2012, it is still an active state highway.

SH-98S first appeared on the Oklahoma highway map in its 1965 edition. At this time, the highway was designated SH-198. The highway would retain this designation until 1985, when it was renumbered to SH-98S.

== Junction list ==
The entire route is in McCurtain County.

Location	mi	km	Destinations	Notes
	0.00	0.00	SH-37	Southern terminus
	6.89	11.09	US 70	
Wright City	13.3	21.4	SH-98S	Northern terminus of SH-98S
	19.67	31.66	SH-3	Northern terminus
1.000 mi = 1.609 km; 1.000 km = 0.621 mi
