= Randall Burks =

American football player (born 1953)

Randy Burks
No. 83
- Position: Wide receiver

Personal information
- Born: August 22, 1953 (age 73); Idabel, Oklahoma, U.S.
- Listed height: 5 ft 11 in (1.80 m)
- Listed weight: 170 lb (77 kg)

Career information
- College: Southeastern Oklahoma State; Oklahoma State
- NFL draft: 1976: 8th round, 233rd overall pick

Career history
- Chicago Bears (1976)

Career NFL statistics
- Receptions: 1
- Receiving yards: 55
- Receiving TDs: 1
- Stats at Pro Football Reference

Randall James Burks (born August 22, 1953) is a former NFL wide receiver who played a single game for the Chicago Bears in 1976. Burks was known for his speed, described as "electrifying".

== Athletic career ==
Born in Garvin, Oklahoma, Burks first gained notice in high school, in Idabel. He set the state record for the indoor 60-yard dash, with a time of 6.1 seconds, and in 1970 and 1971 he was Oklahoma state champion for the 100-yard dash. He first attended Oklahoma State University, but later transferred to the much smaller Southeastern Oklahoma State University, where he was twice named All Conference, and in his senior year he was Oklahoma Intercollegiate Conference and NAIA District-9 Player of the Year. That same year, he was named All-American as well as being voted most outstanding player for Southeastern Oklahoma State. That season Burks led the conference in receiving yardage, averaging 19.8 yards per game, for a total of 913 yards on the year. He scored eleven touchdowns, and was the leading kickoff returner, with a 36.9 yard return average.

He was drafted in the 8th round of the 1976 NFL draft by the St. Louis Cardinals. He was cut late in the pre-season and was signed by the Chicago Bears, where he played the 1976 season. In 1989, Burks was voted into the Southeastern Oklahoma State Athletic Hall of Fame.

Burks is the current NFL leader in receiving yards for players with one career game on their record after catching one touchdown pass for 55 yards for the Bears in a December 5, 1976 game against the Seattle Seahawks.
