= Jack Ridley =

Jack Ridley may refer to:

- Jack Ridley (baseball) (1905–?), American Negro leagues baseball player
- Jack Ridley (pilot) (1915–1957), colonel in the United States Air Force
- Jack Ridley (engineer) (1919–2006), civil engineer and New Zealand politician
- Jack Ridley (swim coach), American swimmer and swim coach

== See also ==
- John Ridley (disambiguation)
