= John Ridley (disambiguation) =

John Ridley (born 1965) is an American writer.

John Ridley may also refer to:

- John S. Ridley (1882–1934) politician in Manitoba, Canada
- John Ridley (footballer, born 1898) (1898–1977), English football player for South Shields, Manchester City, Reading and Queens Park Rangers
- John Ridley (footballer, born 1952) (1952–2020), English football player for Port Vale, Leicester City and Chesterfield
- John Ridley (inventor) (1806–1887), English-born miller and farming machinery inventor and manufacturer in South Australia
- Jack Ridley (engineer) (John Wallace Ridley, 1919–2006), New Zealand engineer and politician
- John Ridley (cricketer) (1879–1903), English cricketer

== See also ==
- Jack Ridley (disambiguation)
