= Wheelock Academy =

- U.S. National Register of Historic Places
- U.S. National Historic Landmark
- Location within Oklahoma Location within the United States
- Nearest city: Millerton, Oklahoma
- Coordinates: 33°59′38″N 94°59′18″W
- Built: 1832
- Architect: Alfred Wright
- NRHP reference No.: 66000949

Significant dates
- Added to NRHP: October 15, 1966
- Designated NHL: December 21, 1965

Wheelock Academy was the model academy for the Five Civilized Tribes' academies. It was started as a missionary school for Choctaw girls, (Note: The school has also been called Wheelock Female Seminary and Wheelock Female Orphan Academy.) and is still owned by the Choctaw nation. The school closed in 1955 and the only remaining Choctaw school, Jones Academy, became coeducational. The site is located 3 miles (4.8 km) east of Millerton in McCurtain County, Oklahoma. It is administered by the Bureau of Indian Affairs.

== History ==
In 1832 the Academy was initiated by Alfred Wright, a physician and Presbyterian missionary who co-founded the nearby Wheelock Church. He and his wife, Harriet Wright, had travelled with the Choctaw tribe when they were expelled from their previous homeland in the southeastern United States and forced to emigrate to Indian Territory. (Note: The Wrights missionary work was sponsored by the American Board of Commissioners for Foreign Missions (ABCFM, Congregationalist).) He named the school after Eleazar Wheelock, founder of Moor's Indian School, later known as Dartmouth College. Within a year, the Superintendent of the Choctaw Agency reported that Wheelock Academy had become a model for Indian education. In 1839, Wright expanded the school by building a large dormitory to accommodate boarding students. The institution he founded became the first Choctaw national academy in 1842. Alfred died March 31, 1853. Reverend John Edwards was asked to replace him as the head of the school. Harriet left the mission within a year because of ill health. She died in Florida in 1863.

== Impact of the Civil War ==
Wheelock Academy was closed during the Civil War (1861 - 1865). The American Board of Missions had ordered Rev. Edwards to close the school and the church and return to the North. (Note: At the outset of the war, the Union Army had abandoned all of its forts in Indian Territory and withdrawn all its troops to Kansas and Missouri, knowing that they would be needed to fight the Confederate Army elsewhere. Civil government essentially collapsed, and irregular guerrillas ran unchecked throughout the territory. John Libby, who had been sent as Edwards' assistant, had already married a Choctaw woman and was determined to remain to look after the mission facilities as best he could. All other non-Choctaw personnel also left.)

== Rebuilding ==
Libby's wife had been a student at Wheelock before the war. The couple maintained the buildings and continued to operate the facility as a day school, until a fire in 1869 destroyed many of the buildings. Classes resumed in some of the less damaged buildings. The Choctaw Nation rebuilt the facility in 1880 - 1884, with assistance from the Southern Presbyterian Church. Although the Presbyterian Home Missions Board and the Federal Government became involved in administering the school, it remained owned and financially supported by the Choctaw Nation.

The Choctaw Council created a National School Board in 1882. The board decided to rebuild the damaged and destroyed buildings and operate Wheelock as a boarding school for girls. John Edwards returned to teach at an academy near Boggy Depot, since his wife had died in 1881 in California. Edwards married a Wheelock teacher, Constance Hunter. The National School Board asked him to return to Wheelock as superintendent in 1884. Instead, he asked them to find another superintendent because he was in poor health. He remained as a mentor until the end of the 1886-87 school year.

Rev. William C. Robe was selected as the next superintendent. He elected to retire in 1890, and was succeeded by his son, J. C. Robe. Beginning in 1890, Wheelock Seminary operated as a "contract school", meaning that the school operated using tribal funds, but staff and superintendents were provided by the American Board of Missionaries.

== Curriculum ==
Children attending the Choctaw academies were ten to sixteen years old. When the boarding schools for females first opened, the girls were taught given English names and told that all instruction would be in English. They were forbidden to use their native language while they were at the school. The curriculum included sewing, making clothing and doing household chores. They also learned business skills, reading, writing and spelling in the English language. Additional courses included Arithmetic, music, and geography were also taught, and in some schools pupils learned algebra, geometry, U.S. history, chemistry, philosophy, botany, astronomy, painting, drawing, and Latin grammar.

== Closure of tribal schools ==
The 1898 Curtis Act had required the gradual closure of all tribal schools, as well as the disestablishments of tribal governments before statehood would be granted. By 1930, Wheelock and the Jones Academy in Hartshorne, Oklahoma were the only remaining Choctaw schools. In 1932, Wheelock became a United States Indian School. In 1955, its functions were merged with Jones Academy, and the Wheelock site was closed permanently. (Note: At present, Jones Academy is a residential care facility for elementary and secondary school age children.)

== NRHP listing ==
The site was declared a National Historic Landmark in 1965. It was added to the National Register of Historic Places in 1966.

== Present condition ==
Only seven buildings remain standing, most in deteriorated condition. Although the local people maintain the grounds, and one building, the former LeFlore Hall, has been turned into a museum.

In 1999, a news program noted that Delton Cox, treasurer of the Choctaw Nation was leading a project to restore the old academy. By then, all of the remaining buildings had been painted and reroofed, at a cost of $70,000. Complete restoration has been estimated to cost $3 million. Cox said that the Choctaw Nation would like to turn the restored facility into a college (which would be the first tribal-owned college in Oklahoma).

A 2001 report to Congress, National Historic Landmarks at the Millennium, listed Wheelock Academy as one of the "Threatened Landmarks in America". The report specifically cited deterioration, looting and vandalism as specific threats.

== See also ==
- Wheelock Church, listed on the National Register
- List of National Historic Landmarks in Oklahoma
- National Register of Historic Places listings in McCurtain County, Oklahoma
