= Wheelock Church =

Historic church in Oklahoma, United States

- U.S. National Register of Historic Places
- Location within Oklahoma Location within the United States
- Nearest city: Millerton, Oklahoma
- Coordinates: 33°59′26″N 94°59′25″W
- Area: 5 acres (2.0 ha)
- Built: 1846
- NRHP reference No.: 72001464
- Added to NRHP: November 9, 1972

Wheelock Church (also known as Wheelock Mission Church) is a historic church building in Millerton, McCurtain County, Oklahoma. Built in 1845-6, the existing stone structure is the oldest surviving church building in the state of Oklahoma and the oldest church congregation in the Choctaw Nation. The building was added to the National Register of Historic Places in 1972.

== History ==
The congregation was established in 1832, and the current stone church building was constructed in 1845–1846 with a cemetery established across the road. Buried in the cemetery is Alfred Wright, a physician and missionary to the Choctaw Native Americans. Wright translated many books into the Choctaw language, including the New Testament. Until the church building was completed, the services were held outdoors under a large oak tree. The congregation sat on logs placed in rows under the tree. Rev. Wright used an overturned 100-gallon barrel as his pulpit. He preached his first sermon there on December 9, 1832.

In 1832 Wright also built a small log cabin church and a larger log house to accommodate the family. He added a large room to the latter, where his wife, Harriet Bunce Wright, and teacher Anna Burnham (Note: Miss Burnham had begun working with the Wrights at Mayhew Mission in 1822. She was assigned by the American Board of Missions to travel with them to the Wheelock site.) could teach local Choctaw children, using a day school format. This would continue until 1839, and would become the nearby Wheelock Academy, a boarding school, which the Choctaw Council sanctioned as a girls' seminary in 1842.

=== The stone church ===
The new building, soon called the "Stone Church," was begun in 1845 and completed in 1846. Financed by donations and constructed by volunteer laborers (mostly Choctaw), it has 20 inches (0.51 m)-thick stone walls and a vaulted ceiling over the main floor and balcony. (Note: The stones were quarried from the Little River banks and dragged up to the building site by oxen drays.) It is about 40 by 50 feet (12 m × 15 m) in plan and its steeple rises to 35 feet (11 m) in height. A slogan favored by Rev. Wright, “Jehovah Jireh” (“the Lord will provide”) was carved into the gable and is said to be still legible. In 1866 the church was damaged by a fire that destroyed the mission to the east, and the church's roof was not restored until 1884. (Note: Another source claims that all of the Wheelock Academy buildings burned down in 1869, but that the church building, located a short distance from the school, survived. That author, Len Green, did not mention an 1866 fire.)

=== The Wrights' deaths ===
Wright was often absent from the pulpit because, as the only person in the area trained in medicine, he would ride out to the home of any one who he heard was ill. However, this practice aggravated his own frail health. He suffered from bursitis, intermittent fevers and an undefined heart problem. He suffered his last attack and died on March 31, 1853. As he had requested earlier, his body was buried in the Wheelock cemetery.

Harriet struggled to keep the mission and school operating, but her own health began failing about a year after Alfred's death. She had to leave Indian Territory and go back east to live with relatives. She died in Madison, Florida on Oct. 3, 1863, and was buried there.

=== Rev. John Edwards ===
The American Board of Missionaries sent Rev. John Edwards to replace Rev. Wright as Wheelock's superintendent, and John Libby as Edwards' assistant. In 1861, after the Choctaw Nation formally allied itself with the Confederate States of America, becoming a belligerent state in the American Civil War, the ABM ordered Edwards to leave Indian Territory and return to the North. (Note: A native of Bath, New York, Edwards was a graduate of Princeton College in 1848 and Princeton Seminary in 1851. From 1851 t0 1853, he taught at Spencer Academy near Fort Towson in Indian Territory. He was ordained by the Presbytery of Indian Territory on December 11, 1853.)

Edwards traveled to San Francisco, California in 1861, where he taught for two years. He then moved to Oakland, California and served as supply minister for several churches for the next 20 years. In 1882, he returned to work among the Choctaws, first at Atoka, then at Wheelock, where he reopened the academy in 1884. He served as academy superintendent until 1895, when the Choctaw Nation took it over. In 1896, he returned to San Jose, California, where he remained until his death December 18, 1903.

== Final year ==
Rev. Evan B. Evans came to Wheelock as the supply minister for one year in 1897. By that time, there were only 60 members, principally students at the school who lived some distance from Wheelock. The students were absent from church for much of the year, so services were discontinued at Wheelock at the end of the year. (Note: In 1910, Wheelock's church function was transferred to a new church in Garvin, Oklahoma, which was led by Rev. W. J. Willis.)

== See also ==
- Wheelock Academy
- Oldest churches in the United States
- Oldest buildings in Oklahoma
