= Grobin Davis Mound Group =

- U.S. National Register of Historic Places
- Nearest city: Wright City, Oklahoma
- Area: 25 acres (10 ha)
- Built: 1200
- NRHP reference No.: 84002637
- Added to NRHP: November 23, 1984

The Grobin Davis Mound Group is a prehistoric Caddoan site located in McCurtain County in Southeastern Oklahoma. It was listed on the National Register of Historic Places in 1984.

It is a relatively large Caddoan ceremonial center. It is located on a terrace above the confluence of Little River and White Oak Creek, and includes seven mounds and a central plaza in an approximately 25 acres (10 ha) area.
