= Simonburn =

Coordinates: 55.0558°N 2.1972°W

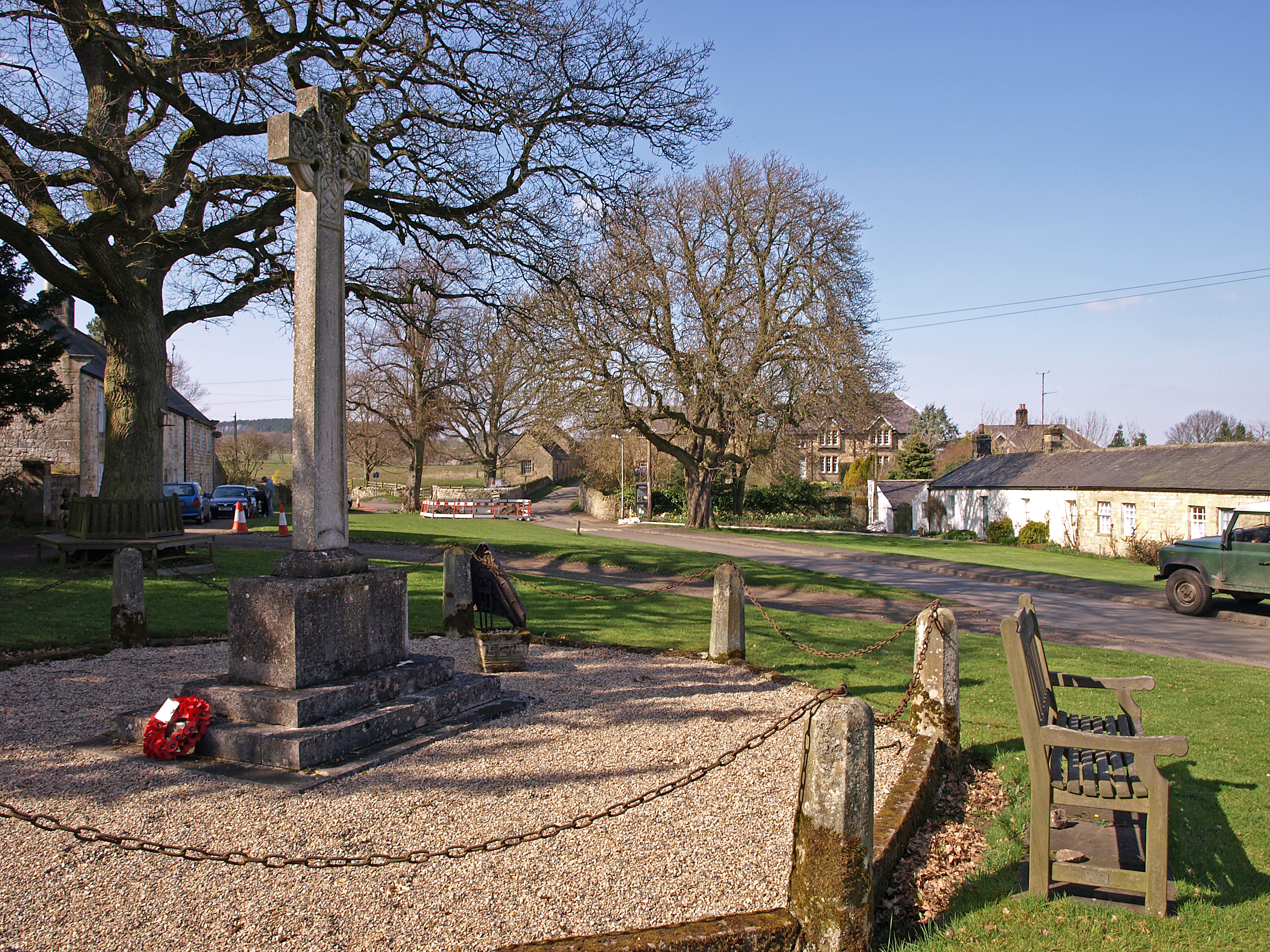

- Location within Northumberland
- Population: 192 (2011)
- OS grid reference: NY875735
- District: Northumberland
- Shire county: Northumberland
- Region: North East
- Country: England
- Sovereign state: United Kingdom
- Post town: Hexham
- Postcode district: NE48
- Police: Northumbria
- Fire: Northumberland
- Ambulance: North East
- UK Parliament: Hexham

Simonburn is a small human settlement in Northumberland, England.

== Early history ==
Simonburn lies to the north of Hadrian's Wall, the most noted Roman monument in Britain. The history of that wall as well as the Roman Stanegate forms the earliest recorded history of the Simonburn vicinity. The length of Hadrian's Wall is 117 kilometres, spanning the width of Britain; the wall incorporates the Vallum, a rearward ditch system, and was constructed chiefly to prevent harrying by small bands of raiders and unwanted immigration from the north, not as a fighting front for a major invasion.

== Landmarks ==
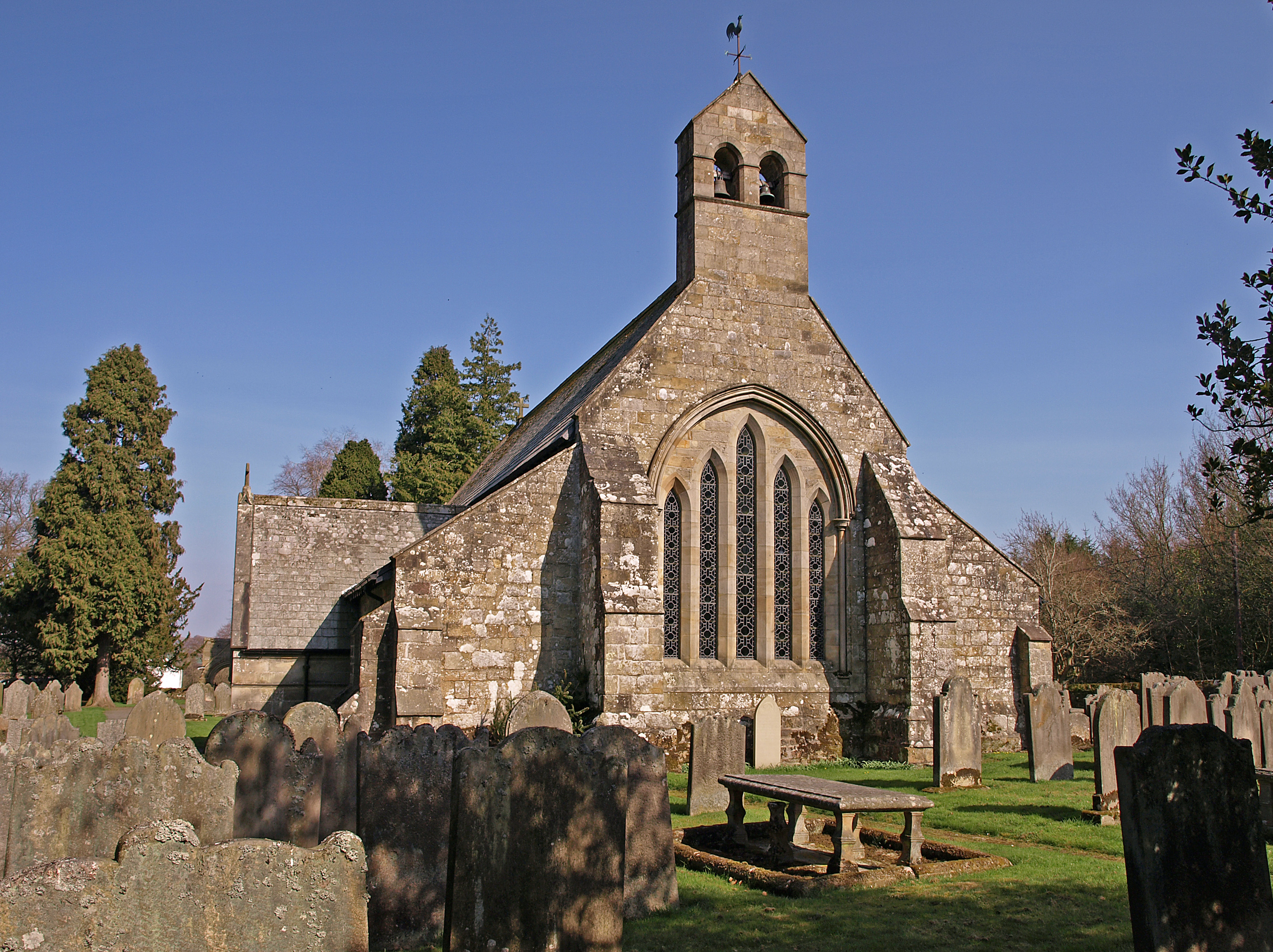
St Mungo's church

Nunwick Hall is a privately owned 18th-century country house nearby. The house is a Grade II* listed building.

Simonburn Castle was held by the Heron family of Chipchase Castle from the 14th century until it was sold in 1718. The castle was subsequently dismantled by treasure hunters.

== Notable people ==
- John Ridley (1879–1903), cricketer

== See also ==
- Walwick
