= Forest Grove School District (Oklahoma) =

School district in Oklahoma

Coordinates: 33.926°N 94.929°W

Address
- 1941 Forest Grove Road Garvin, Oklahoma, 74736; United States

District information
- Type: Public
- Grades: PreK–8
- NCES District ID: 4011850

Students and staff
- Students: 125
- Teachers: 10.39
- Staff: 24.76
- Student–teacher ratio: 12.03

Other information
- Website: forestgrove.k12.ok.us

Forest Grove Public School is a school district in McCurtain County, Oklahoma. Its sole school is Forest Grove School in Garvin, which serves PreK-8. As of 1999 it had 123 students. In addition to Garvin, the district includes a part of Idabel.
