= Larzette Hale-Wilson =

American accountant

Larzette Golden Hale-Wilson
- Born: June 8, 1920; Idabel, Oklahoma, US
- Died: February 5, 2015 (aged 94); Vancouver, Washington, US
- Occupations: Accountant, educator
- Spouse: Henry William Hale

Academic background
- Education: Langston University (BS); University of Wisconsin-Madison (MA, PhD)
- Thesis: Relationship of Cost Accounting Concepts to Corporate Product-Line Analysis and Pricing Policy (1955)

Academic work
- Discipline: Accounting
- Institutions: Brigham Young University; Clark Atlanta University; Langston University; Utah State University; University of Utah

Larzette Golden Hale-Wilson (June 8, 1920 – February 5, 2015) was an American accountant, educator, and former international president of the Alpha Kappa Alpha sorority. She is recognized as the first Black woman certified public accountant (CPA) to earn a PhD in accounting and the first Black female CPA in the state of Georgia.

== Early life and education ==
Larzette Golden was born on June 8, 1920, in Idabel, Oklahoma, to Thomas and Mary Golden. After her father died when she was age 10, her mother, unable to care for her and her sister, placed them in the Industrial Institute for the Deaf, Blind and Orphans of the Colored Race in Taft, Oklahoma. She excelled at typing and started performing clerical and bookkeeping tasks at the orphanage, eventually finding a mentor in the orphanage's accountant.

After graduation from high school, she went on to enroll at Langston University. While at Langston, she became a charter member of the Alpha Zeta chapter of Alpha Kappa Alpha sorority in 1939. In 1940, she graduated summa cum laude and class valedictorian from Langston University with a Bachelor of Science degree in Business Administration and Secondary Education. She married her college classmate, William Henry Hale, on May 24, 1940, and began working as a secretary to the business manager at Langston University until 1942. She then enrolled at the University of Wisconsin-Madison, where she earned a Master of Arts degree in accounting and finance in 1943.

== Career ==
In 1943, Hale-Wilson and her husband accepted positions at Bethune-Cookman College in Daytona Beach, Florida. She served as a faculty member in the Business Administration department and as secretary to the president. During this period, she undertook finance coursework at the University of Chicago during the summer of 1945. In 1948, the Hales relocated to Atlanta, Georgia, where she joined the faculty of Clark College (now known as Clark Atlanta University) as a professor in the Department of Business Administration and Secretarial Science. During her time at Clark College, Hale-Wilson was encouraged by a mentor to pursue her CPA license. Due to Jim Crow segregation practices at the time, she was required to sit at the back of the examination room while taking the CPA exam but ultimately passed and obtained her CPA license in 1951 from the Georgia State Board of Accountancy. Following her licensure, she pursued her doctoral studies at the University of Wisconsin-Madison, receiving her PhD in accounting in 1955, being the first Black woman in the US to do so. Her dissertation was titled "Relationship of Cost Accounting Concepts to Corporate Product-Line Analysis and Pricing Policy". In the same year, she also opened a public accounting practice in Atlanta and began serving as Acting Chairman of the Business Administration Department at Clark College, a position she held until 1960.

From 1958 to 1962, Hale-Wilson served as national treasurer for Alpha Kappa Alpha. In 1960, the Hales returned to Langston University, where William Hale became president. At Langston, Larzette Hale-Wilson held roles as Director of Development and Public Relations and Professor in the Division of Education and the Department of Business Administration. In 1964, she formally joined the Langston faculty as a professor. In 1966, she became the international president of Alpha Kappa Alpha, serving until 1970. In 1968, while at Langston, she was appointed acting chairman of the department of business administration and initiated Langston University's Industrial Orientation Program. Following her husband's departure from Langston in 1969, Hale-Wilson remained on the faculty for the 1971–1972 academic year.

In 1972, she joined the faculty of Utah State University (USU) in Logan, Utah. From 1977 to 1990, she served as accountancy department head at USU. During this period, the department achieved designation as a School of Accountancy and secured accreditation. From 1978 to 1979, she served on the American Accounting Association (AAA) Committee on Minorities. From 1984 to 1985, she served as president of the American Woman's Society of Certified Public Accountants (AWSCPA).

Following her retirement from USU in 1990, she held the Georgia White Distinguished Professorship at Brigham Young University for two years. From 1990 to 1993, she served as chairperson of the American Institute of Certified Public Accountants (AICPA) Academic and Career Development Executive Committee. In 1992, she chaired the Utah Association of CPAs (UACPA) first Educators Conference. In 1993, she served as a council member-at-large for the AICPA and also began her service on the Utah State Board of Regents, a role she held until 1999. In the late 1990s, she held visiting positions at the University of St. Thomas for two summers and returned to Langston University, serving as interim dean in 1997 and then dean of the School of Business in 1998. Her final academic appointment was a semester teaching at the University of Utah in 1998. In 1999, she received the UACPA's Distinguished Service Award.

== Death ==
Larzette Golden Hale-Wilson died on February 5, 2015, in Vancouver, Washington. In 2019, the Jon M. Huntsman School of Business at Utah State University created the Larzette Hale Scholarship in Accounting to honor her.
