= Garvin Rock Church =

Historic church in Oklahoma, United States

- U.S. National Register of Historic Places
- Location within Oklahoma Location within the United States
- Location: Love and Williams Sts., Garvin, Oklahoma
- Coordinates: 33.95521°N 94.94034°W
- Area: less than one acre
- Built: 1910
- Built by: Morris, M.C.
- Architect: Campbell & Owens
- NRHP reference No.: 80003275
- Added to NRHP: June 16, 1980

The Garvin Rock Church is a historic church at Love and Williams Streets in Garvin, Oklahoma. Also known as Old Rock Church, it was built in 1910 and added to the National Register in 1980.

It was an impressive church for its small town, when completed in 1910. It is about 44 by 64 feet (13 m × 20 m) in plan, with three crenelated towers, the tallest of which stands 25 feet (7.6 m) tall. It has two sets of stained glass windows.

In 2001, the church was in disrepair and deemed too expensive to repair.
