= Phillip Balisle =

American Navy admiral

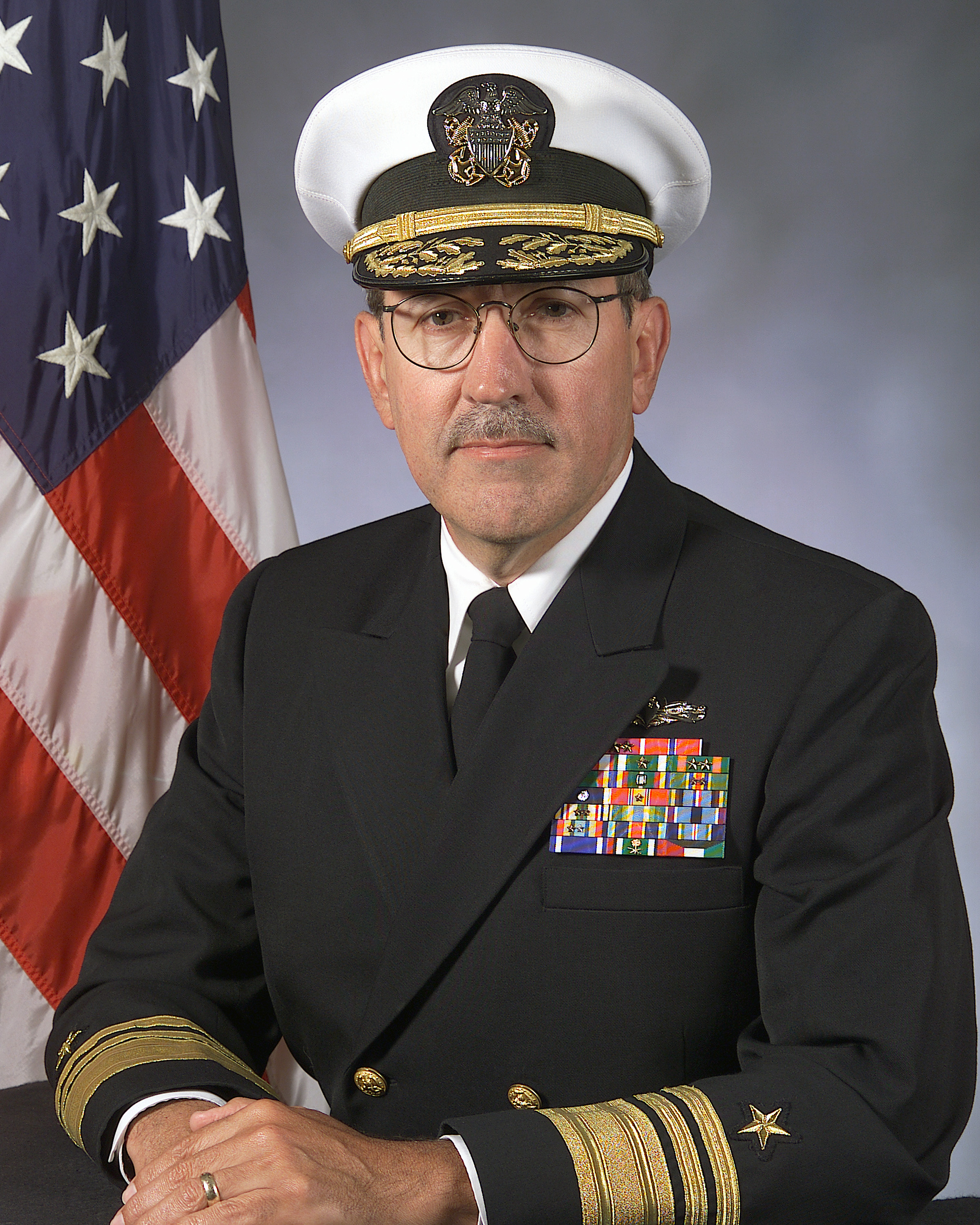
Vice Adm. Phillip Balisle

Vice Adm. Phillip Monroe Balisle (born 1948) a native of Idabel, Oklahoma, was commissioned in the United States Navy in 1970 after graduating from Oklahoma State University. At sea, he commanded the destroyer USS Kidd (DDG-993), the cruiser USS Anzio (CG-68) and the USS Abraham Lincoln (CVN-72) Battle Group. He served as Director, Surface Warfare Division (OPNAV N76) on the Chief of Naval Operations staff at the Pentagon.

Balisle assumed command of Naval Sea Systems Command (NAVSEA) 28 June 2002, where he previously served as vice commander.

Balisle has received the Distinguished Service Medal, five awards of the Legion of Merit, seven Meritorious Service Medals and the Bronze Star Medal.

After retiring from the Navy, Balisle took a role as executive vice president of DRS Technologies, Inc.
