= Millerton, Oklahoma =

- Town
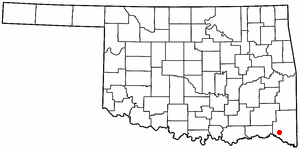
- Location in Oklahoma
- Coordinates: 33°59′09″N 95°01′10″W
- Country: United States
- State: Oklahoma
- County: McCurtain

Area
  - Total: 1.63 sq mi (4.22 km^{2})
  - Land: 1.62 sq mi (4.19 km^{2})
  - Water: 0.0077 sq mi (0.02 km^{2})
- Elevation: 502 ft (153 m)

Population (2020)
  - Total: 215
  - Density: 133/sq mi (51.3/km^{2})
- Time zone: UTC-6 (Central (CST))
  - Summer (DST): UTC-5 (CDT)
- ZIP Code: 74750 (Millerton); 74736 (Garvin); 74764 (Valliant)
- Area code: 580
- FIPS code: 40-48600
- GNIS feature ID: 2412998

Millerton is a town in McCurtain County, Oklahoma, United States. The population was 215 at the 2020 census, down from 320 in 2010. The oldest church building in Oklahoma, Wheelock Church, is located near Millerton.

== Geography ==
Millerton is in western McCurtain County along U.S. Route 70, which leads southeast 13 miles (21 km) to Idabel, the county seat, and west 30 miles (48 km) to Hugo. Oklahoma State Highway 98 passes just west of Millerton, leading north 6 miles (10 km) to Wright City and south 9 miles (14 km) to the Texas border on the Red River at Albion.

According to the U.S. Census Bureau, the town of Millerton has a total area of 1.63 square miles (4.22 km^{2}), of which 0.01 square miles (0.03 km^{2}), or 0.55%, are water. The town sits on high ground which drains south toward Buzzard Creek, a direct tributary of the Red River, and north to Wheelock Creek, a tributary of the Little River, which joins the Red River in Arkansas.

== Demographics ==
Historical population
Census	Pop.	Note	%±
1980	262		—
1990	234		−10.7%
2000	359		53.4%
2010	320		−10.9%
2020	215		−32.8%
U.S. Decennial Census

=== 2020 census ===
As of the 2020 census, Millerton had a population of 215. The median age was 47.2 years. 26.0% of residents were under the age of 18 and 27.0% of residents were 65 years of age or older. For every 100 females there were 110.8 males, and for every 100 females age 18 and over there were 103.8 males age 18 and over.

0.0% of residents lived in urban areas, while 100.0% lived in rural areas.

There were 94 households in Millerton, of which 34.0% had children under the age of 18 living in them. Of all households, 43.6% were married-couple households, 24.5% were households with a male householder and no spouse or partner present, and 26.6% were households with a female householder and no spouse or partner present. About 28.8% of all households were made up of individuals and 8.5% had someone living alone who was 65 years of age or older.

There were 103 housing units, of which 8.7% were vacant. The homeowner vacancy rate was 0.0% and the rental vacancy rate was 0.0%.

Racial composition as of the 2020 census
Race	Number	Percent
White	156	72.6%
Black or African American	14	6.5%
American Indian and Alaska Native	23	10.7%
Asian	0	0.0%
Native Hawaiian and Other Pacific Islander	0	0.0%
Some other race	0	0.0%
Two or more races	22	10.2%
Hispanic or Latino (of any race)	3	1.4%

=== 2000 census ===
As of the census of 2000, there were 359 people, 145 households, and 100 families residing in the town. The population density was 201.4 inhabitants per square mile (77.8/km^{2}). There were 188 housing units at an average density of 105.5 per square mile (40.7/km^{2}). The racial makeup of the town was 73.82% White, 4.18% African American, 14.76% Native American, 0.28% from other races, and 6.96% from two or more races. Hispanic or Latino of any race were 1.11% of the population.

There were 145 households, out of which 34.5% had children under the age of 18 living with them, 53.8% were married couples living together, 6.9% had a female householder with no husband present, and 31.0% were non-families. 26.9% of all households were made up of individuals, and 6.2% had someone living alone who was 65 years of age or older. The average household size was 2.48 and the average family size was 3.02.

In the town, the population was spread out, with 27.6% under the age of 18, 7.5% from 18 to 24, 27.9% from 25 to 44, 26.5% from 45 to 64, and 10.6% who were 65 years of age or older. The median age was 35 years. For every 100 females, there were 115.0 males. For every 100 females age 18 and over, there were 98.5 males.

The median income for a household in the town was $19,375, and the median income for a family was $31,875. Males had a median income of $30,577 versus $15,000 for females. The per capita income for the town was $11,168. About 21.6% of families and 26.7% of the population were below the poverty line, including 24.0% of those under age 18 and 29.4% of those age 65 or over.

== Education ==
It is in the Valliant Public Schools school district.
