= John Ridley (cricketer) =

English cricketer

Personal information
- Full name: John Nicholas Ridley
- Born: 7 June 1879; Simonburn, Northumberland, England
- Died: 28 March 1903 (aged 23); Sydney, New South Wales, Australia
- Batting: Unknown
- Bowling: Unknown

Career statistics
Competition	First-class
Matches	3
Runs scored	59
Batting average	19.66
100s/50s	–/–
Top score	30*
Balls bowled	132
Wickets	0
Bowling average	–
5 wickets in innings	–
10 wickets in match	–
Best bowling	–
Catches/stumpings	1/–
- Source: Cricinfo, 26 July 2019

John Nicholas Ridley (7 June 1879 – 28 March 1903) was an English first-class cricketer.

Ridley was born at Simonburn, Northumberland and later studied at the University of Oxford. He later toured British India with the Oxford University Authentics in 1902–03, making three first-class appearances on the tour against Bombay, the Parsees and the Gentlemen of England. He scored 59 in his three first-class matches, with a high score of 30 not out. After departing from the touring party following the conclusion of the tour, Ridley intended to return home having travelled via Ceylon, Australia, China, Japan, and the United States. He made it as far as Australia, where he became stricken with typhoid fever. He died from the disease at Sydney in March 1903.
