= Frisco League =

High school athletic conference in Missouri, United States

- Association: MSHSAA
- Founded: 1924; 102 years ago
- Sports fielded: 10; men's: 5; women's: 5
- No. of teams: 9
- Region: Mid-Missouri
- Website: friscoleague.com

The Frisco League is a high school athletic conference consisting of nine high schools in Mid-Missouri. All the schools in the conference are Class 2 and 3, a norm for small rural schools in the area. The league takes its name from the St. Louis – San Francisco Railway (the Frisco), which was, and still is, a major presence in the area— especially before the birth of Route 66.

The league officially offers championships for girls in Basketball, Cross Country, Softball, Track & Field and Volleyball. And for boys the league officially sponsors championships in Baseball, Basketball, Cross Country, Soccer and Track & Field. Some schools sponsor sports that are not sponsored by the league but are sponsored by the Missouri State High School Activities Association, such as Golf, Tennis and Girls soccer.

The league is also somewhat unusual among those in Missouri in that it offers official fall baseball and spring softball competition.

== Member schools ==
| School | Nickname | Colors | Town | County | School Enrollment (2014–16) | Primary MSHSAA class* |
|---|---|---|---|---|---|---|
| Crocker High School | (Lady) Lions | | Crocker | Pulaski | 150 | 2 |
| Dixon High School | (Lady) Bulldogs | | Dixon | Pulaski | 312 | 3 |
| Iberia High School | Lady Rangers | | Iberia | Miller | 220 | 2 |
| Laquey High School | (Lady) Hornets | | Laquey | Pulaski | 209 | 2 |
| Licking High School | (Lady) Wildcats | | Licking | Texas | 271 | 3 |
| Newburg High School | (Lady) Wolves | | Newburg | Phelps | 160 | 2 |
| Plato High School | (Lady) Eagles | | Plato | Texas | 207 | 2 |
| Richland High School | (Lady) Bears | | Richland | Pulaski | 199 | 2 |
| Stoutland High School | (Lady) Tigers | | Stoutland | Camden | 133 | 2 |

*The class in which a school competes depends on the size of the school, and the particular sport or activity. Most activities (for example softball, track, cross country) compete in four classes, but basketball competes in five and football in six. Because basketball is by far the most popular sport in the state in regards to school participation, MSHSAA officially uses the five-class system to classify schools.

== History ==
The league was organized in Lebanon in 1924 by future governor of Missouri Phil M. Donnelly, a Lebanon attorney. Teams in the league represented Lebanon, Stoutland, Richland, Crocker, Linn Creek, Conway, Niangua and Marshfield. That league was known as the Frisco High School Athletic Association.

The league was composed of those area schools whose major sport was basketball, but who did not have an indoor court. Another requirement was that none of the conference schools could have a football program because of obvious scheduling conflicts. Although this is no longer a rule today, none of the Frisco League schools currently have football teams. Iberia had a team in the late 1980s but it was disbanded in 1987.

The Frisco High School Athletic Association gradually became known as the Frisco League. League competition branched out into baseball, academic areas and other areas.

== State championships ==
Dixon

- 1969 Boys Basketball (M)
- 1976 Baseball (A)

Iberia

- 2001 Baseball (2A)
- 2024 Baseball (Class 2)

Licking

- 1975 Volleyball
- 1979 Volleyball (1A-2A)
- 1988 Baseball (2A)
- 1989 Baseball (2A)
- 1989 Boys Basketball (2A)
- 2002 Boys Cross Country (2)
- 2023 Baseball

Plato

- 2005 Baseball (1)

Richland

- 1996 Academic Competition (2A)
- 1997 Academic Competition (2A)
- 1998 Academic Competition (2A)
- 1999 Academic Competition (2A)
- 2000 Academic Competition (2A)
- 2001 Academic Competition (2A)
- 2003 Academic Competition (2)
- 2004 Academic Competition (2)
- 2005 Academic Competition (2)
- 2006 Academic Competition (2)
- 2007 Academic Competition (2)
- 2008 Academic Competition (2)
- 2009 Academic Competition (2)
- 2011 Scholar Bowl (2)
- 2014 Scholar Bowl (2)

== Conference Championships ==
=== Boys Basketball ===
| Year | School | Wins | Losses | Overall Record |
|---|---|---|---|---|
| 2024 | Crocker Licking | 7 7 | 1 1 | 20-6 20-6 |
| 2023 | Licking | 7 | 1 | 18-9 |
| 2022 | Richland | 8 | 0 | 22-4 |
| 2021 | Iberia* | 4 | 0 | 20-3 |
| 2020 | Iberia | 8 | 0 | 22-5 |
| 2019 | Licking | 7 | 1 | 24-5 |
| 2018 | Licking | 8 | 0 | 22-7 |
| 2017 | Licking | 8 | 0 | 25-4 |
| 2016 | Iberia | 7 | 1 | 28-4 |
| 2015 | Licking | 7 | 0 | 24-5 |
| 2014 | Iberia | 8 | 0 | 29-2 |
| 2013 | Dixon | 8 | 0 | 19-8 |
| 2012 | Licking | 7 | 1 | 22-6 |
| 2011 | Dixon | 7 | 1 | 24-4 |
| 2010 | Laquey | 8 | 0 | 22-6 |
| 2009 | Laquey | 8 | 0 | 26-2 |

=== Girls Basketball ===
| Year | School | Wins | Losses | Overall Record |
|---|---|---|---|---|
| 2024 | Licking | 8 | 0 | 20-7 |
| 2023 | Licking | 8 | 0 | 22-6 |
| 2022 | Licking | 8 | 0 | 24-5 |
| 2021 | Richland* | 6 | 0 | 18-4 |
| 2020 | Richland | 7 | 1 | 18-6 |
| 2019 | Licking | 8 | 0 | 26-6 |
| 2018 | Licking | 8 | 0 | 26-3 |
| 2017 | Newburg Licking Richland | 7 | 1 | 24-5 23-6 17-10 |
| 2016 | Crocker | 8 | 0 | 24-3 |
| 2015 | Licking | 7 | 0 | 24-5 |
| 2014 | Licking | 8 | 0 | 22-5 |
| 2013 | Dixon | 8 | 0 | 25-4 |
| 2012 | Crocker Licking Dixon | 7 | 1 | 24-6 17-9 21-4 |
| 2011 | Crocker | 6 | 2 | 17-7 |
| 2010 | Crocker | 8 | 0 | 19-7 |
| 2009 | Laquey | 7 | 1 | 23-2 |

== Conference Tournament Champions ==
=== Boys Basketball ===
| Year | Championship | | 3rd Place Game | | Consolation |
|---|---|---|---|---|---|
| | 1st | 2nd | 3rd | 4th | |
| 2024 | Dixon 69 | Stoutland 57 | Crocker | Plato | Licking |
| 2023 | Licking 69 | Newburg 42 | Iberia 56 | Dixon 49 | Crocker |
| 2022 | Licking 59 | Stoutland 49 | Dixon 68 | Iberia 56 | Newburg |
| 2021 | Dixon 28 | Richland 27 | Licking 81 | Plato 60 | Crocker |
| 2020 | Iberia 66 | Richland 45 | Dixon 65 | Plato 31 | Licking |
| 2019 | Iberia 46 | Dixon 40 | LIcking 72 | Plato 59 | Richland |
| 2018 | Licking 61 | Iberia 31 | Plato 70 | Richland 50 | Dixon |
| 2017 | Licking 68 | Crocker 58 | Plato 91 | Dixon 71 | Newburg |
| 2016 | Licking 53 | Newburg 36 | Iberia 69 | Richland 68 | Crocker |
| 2015 | Iberia 58 | Licking 47 | Dixon 59 | Richland 49 | Plato |
| 2014 | Iberia 68 | Licking 59 | Plato 55 | Newburg 31 | Dixon |
| 2013 | Iberia 72 | Licking 55 | Newburg 52 | Crocker 38 | Plato |
| 2012 | Iberia 52 | Licking 42 | Dixon 77 | Crocker 53 | Newburg |
| 2011 | Licking 74 | Iberia 58 | Richland 72 | Dixon 68 | Stoutland |
| 2010 | Stoutland 102 | Dixon 92 | Richland 72 | Laquey 50 | Plato |
| 2009 | Stoutland 65 | Laquey 48 | Plato 52 | Dixon 44 | Newburg |
| 2008 | Laquey 56 | Stoutland 52 | Plato 68 | Iberia 60 | Dixon |

=== Girls Basketball ===
| Year | Championship | | 3rd Place Game | | Consolation |
|---|---|---|---|---|---|
| | 1st | 2nd | 3rd | 4th | |
| 2024 | Iberia | Crocker | Licking | Richland | |
| 2023 | Licking 58 | Richland 41 | Iberia 61 | Stoutland 43 | Crocker |
| 2022 | Licking 66 | Stoutland 44 | Crocker 56 | Newburg 44 | Laquey |
| 2021 | Licking 62 | Newburg 45 | Richland 71 | Crocker 69 | Laquey |
| 2020 | Richland 39 | Licking 27 | Crocker 62 | Newburg 37 | Plato |
| 2019 | Licking 62 | Richland 43 | Newburg 57 | Stoutland 45 | Crocker |
| 2018 | Licking 55 | Stoutland 33 | Newburg 59 | Richland 53 | Plato |
| 2017 | Licking 52 | Richland 44 | Plato 68 | Dixon 45 | Stoutland |
| 2016 | Licking 62 | Plato 51 | Newburg 30 | Richland 24 | Dixon |
| 2015 | Crocker 67 | Plato 59 | Stoutland 38 | Newburg 29 | Richland |
| 2014 | Plato 62 | Licking 53 | Crocker 63 | Newburg 44 | Dixon |
| 2013 | Plato 54 | Licking 49 | Laquey 38 | Dixon 33 | Newburg |
| 2012 | Crocker 52 | Dixon 47 | Licking 57 | Laquey 42 | Plato |
| 2011 | Dixon 39 | Crocker 33 | Laquey 49 | Licking 40 | Richland |
| 2010 | Richland 68 | Crocker 57 | Laquey 62 | Dixon 50 | Newburg |
| 2009 | Laquey 62 | Richland 35 | Newburg 73 | Crocker 54 | Stoutland |
| 2008 | Laquey 48 | Licking 41 | Richland 84 | Newburg 50 | Crocker |

=== Baseball ===
| Year | Championship | | 3rd Place Game | | Consolation |
|---|---|---|---|---|---|
| | 1st | 2nd | 3rd | 4th | |
| 2023 | Iberia 6 | Licking 2 | Crocker 3 | Dixon 2 | Stoutland |
| 2022 | Licking 5 | Dixon 3 | Iberia 10 | Stoutland 9 | Crocker |
| 2021 | Licking 11 | Iberia 4 | Plato 5 | Stoutland 4 | Dixon |
| 2020 | Licking 16 | Iberia 10 | Dixon 13 | Plato 7 | Richland |
| 2019 | Iberia 11 | Licking 3 | Dixon 12 | Newburg 2 | Crocker |
| 2018 | Iberia 6 | Dixon 4 | Licking 10 | Plato 0 | Richland |
| 2017 | Iberia 9 | Dixon 2 | Licking 9 | Plato 5 | Newburg |
| 2016 | No | Tournament | | | |
| 2015 | Plato 10 | Dixon 0 | Crocker 9 | Licking 2 | Iberia |
| 2014 | No | Tournament | | | |
| 2013 | No | Tournament | | | |
| 2012 | No | Tournament | | | |
| 2011 | No | Tournament | | | |
| 2010 | No | Tournament | | | |
