= Idabel Armory =

- U.S. National Register of Historic Places
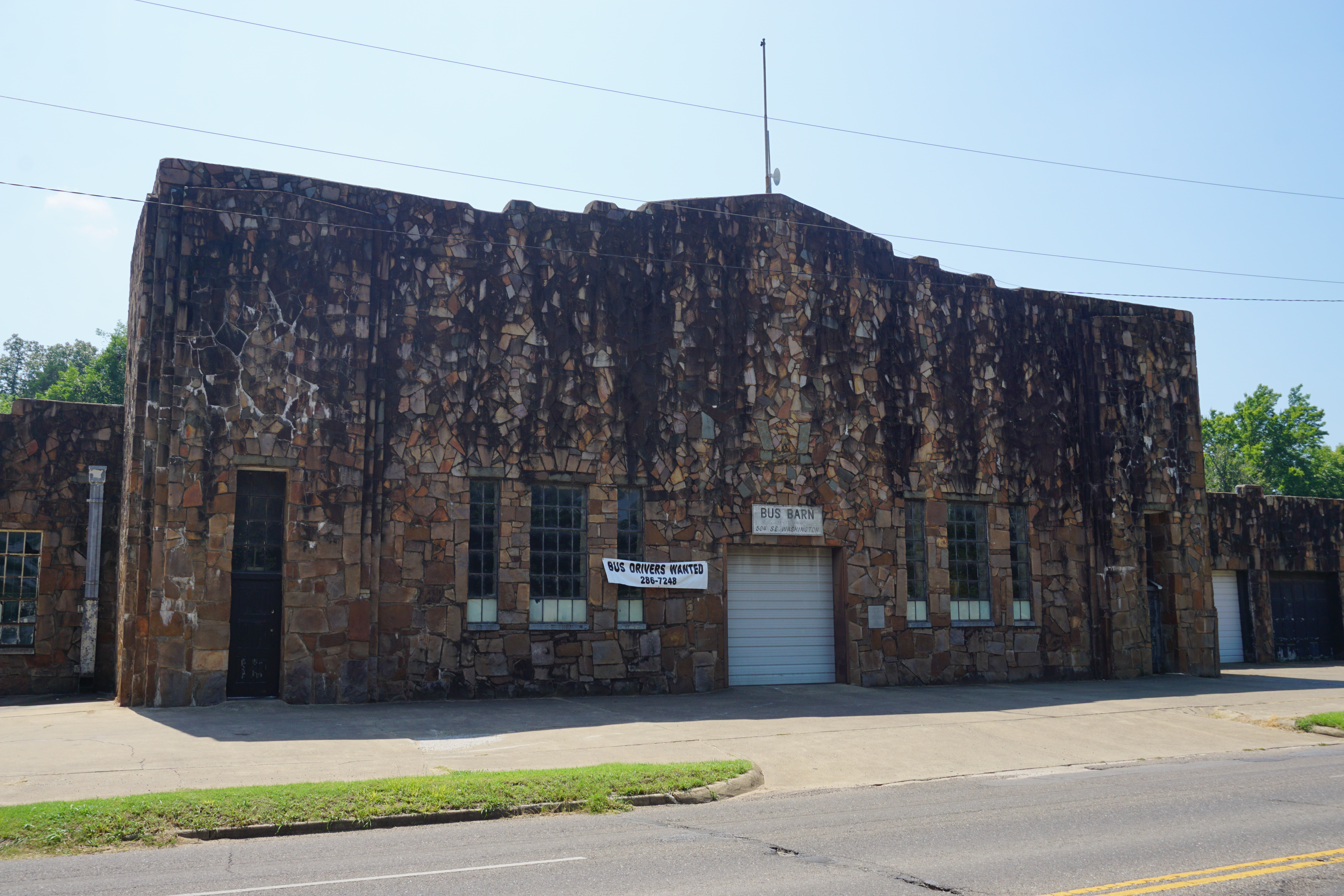

- Location within Oklahoma Location within the United States
- Location: Washington and SE Avenue F Sts., Idabel, Oklahoma
- Coordinates: 33°53′43″N 94°49′16″W
- Area: less than one acre
- Built: 1936
- Architectural style: Romanesque, Vernacular Romanesque
- MPS: WPA Public Bldgs., Recreational Facilities and Cemetery Improvements in Southeastern Oklahoma, 1935--1943 TR
- NRHP reference No.: 88001409
- Added to NRHP: September 8, 1988

The Idabel Armory in Idabel, Oklahoma was built in 1936 as a Works Progress Administration (WPA) project. It was listed on the National Register of Historic Places in 1988.

It is a single-story building built of sandstone. Its main portion is 86 by 124 feet (26 m × 38 m) and it has two 30 by 92 feet (9.1 m × 28.0 m) wings.

Its NRHP nomination notes:

As a WPA building, the armory is notable primarily for its scale. That quality makes the structure significant within the community of Idabel, but more important is its type, materials of construction and character of workmanship. Equally significant is that the building itself contributed to a state of military preparedness which enabled the Oklahoma National Guard to contribute to the allied victory during World War II. Among other things, it contains an in-door rifle range. Construction of the armory likewise provided jobs for destitute workers at a point in the depression of the 1930s when there were none in the private sector, resulting in some economic security and greater self-esteem.
