= Jack Ridley (pilot) =

United States Air Force officer (1915–1957)

Jackie Lynwood Ridley
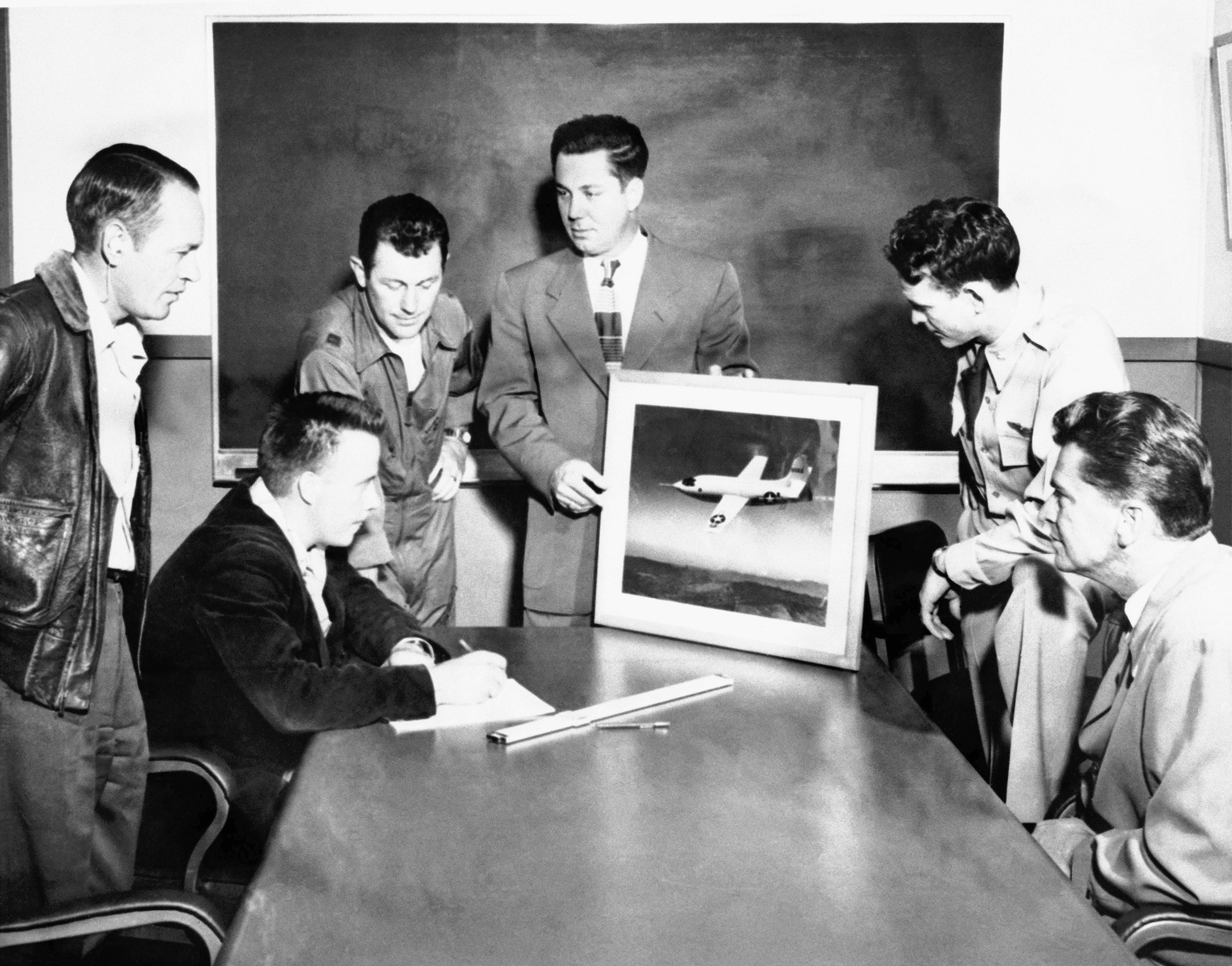
- XS-1 Research Team. Jack Ridley is 2nd from right.
- Born: June 16, 1915; Garvin, Oklahoma, U.S.
- Died: March 12, 1957 (aged 41) northwest of Tokyo, Japan
- Education: University of Oklahoma, B.S. 1939; Caltech, M.S. 1945
- Military career
- Allegiance: United States
- Branch: United States Army Air Forces; United States Air Force
- Rank: Colonel
- Nickname: Jack

Colonel Jackie Lynwood Ridley (June 16, 1915 – March 12, 1957) was an aeronautical engineer, USAF test pilot and chief of the U.S. Air Force's Flight Test Engineering Laboratory. He helped develop and test many Cold War era military aircraft. He worked on the Bell X-1, the first aircraft to achieve supersonic flight, and was highly respected among fellow test pilots, most notably Chuck Yeager, for his engineering skills.

== Early life and military career ==
Jack Ridley was born on June 16, 1915, in Garvin, Oklahoma. Ridley graduated from a high school in Sulphur, Oklahoma in 1935. Following high school, he entered the ROTC program at the University of Oklahoma where he received his Bachelor of Science degree in mechanical engineering in 1939. In July 1941, the young engineer received a commission in the U.S. Army field artillery and began a military career, which would continue for the rest of his life. The science of flight soon attracted him, however, and it was not long before he transferred to the Army Air Forces. Lieutenant Ridley was sent to the Flying Training School at Kelly Army Air Base in Texas, where he earned his pilot wings in May 1942.

== Wartime career as a test pilot ==
The Air Corps needed engineering-trained pilots and, instead of being sent into an operational combat unit, Ridley was ordered to the Consolidated Vultee plant in Fort Worth, Texas, where his initial assignment was to conduct acceptance tests on four-engine B-24 Liberator bombers. Soon thereafter, he was named as engineering liaison officer on both the B-24 and B-32 programs. Even at that early date, the Air Corps was developing the six-engine B-36 intercontinental bomber, later to become the mainstay of the postwar Strategic Air Command, and Ridley found himself assigned to that program as well.

In 1944, Ridley was sent off to further his education. After attending the Army Air Forces School of Engineering at Wright Field (later renamed the Air Force Institute of Technology), Ridley was sent to the California Institute of Technology where he received his Master of Science degree in aeronautical engineering in July 1945.

== Postwar career ==
Ridley was sent to Wright Field, Ohio, and assigned to the Air Materiel Command's Flight Test Division. Ridley went to the Air Materiel Command Flight Performance School from January through May 1946. In the spring of 1946, he graduated with Class 46A.

Even as Ridley was attending the Flight Performance School, the revolutionary X-1 rocket research airplane was making its initial unpowered check flights and, within a year, the USAAF (soon to achieve independence as the United States Air Force) would assume control of the supersonic research program. Colonel Albert Boyd, the chief of the Flight Test Division selected the project team that would attempt the world's first supersonic flight. In the spring of 1947, Boyd appraised his roster of 125 test pilots and finally selected three volunteers who were considered very junior in terms of their flight test experience: Captain Charles E. "Chuck" Yeager, 1st Lieutenant Robert A. "Bob" Hoover, and Ridley. He named Yeager and Hoover as primary and backup pilot respectively, and Ridley as project engineer.

The choice was a happy one. As Yeager later explained:

"Well, ... Hoover and I were definitely not flight test engineers! We could fly airplanes and we had an instinct for aerodynamics ... but Jack Ridley ... was a brain! Jack Ridley knew everything there was to know about aerodynamics and he was practical. And, besides, he was a good pilot ... and he fit right in with us. He spoke our language. Bob was a Tennessean and I was a West Virginian and, being an Okie, Jack spoke real good language for us."

"Even before we flew the X-1, I talked to him at great length about ‘what are we getting into? You know, what's it mean? We're going to be fooling around out of my realm…and you may understand this stuff but I don't. What the hell are we getting into?' And Jack would patiently explain. And I had a great deal of confidence in him and, you know, if he said something, that, to me, was from the Bible. You could take it to the bank."

Ridley's task was to analyze all of the technical data that was generated during the X-1 flights as it proceeded toward the unexplored region of supersonic flight. Studying the phenomena that the research plane encountered as it passed through the transonic region, he translated all of the information into pilot terminology for Yeager so that the flight program could be carried forward expeditiously, yet with safety. As Yeager later explained:

"I trusted Jack with my life. He was the only person on earth who could have kept me from flying the X-1. As committed as I was to the program, and with all that was riding on these flights, if Jack had said, 'Chuck, if you fly in that thing, you're not gonna make it,' that would have been it for yours truly."

Ridley had to rise to meet unexpected problems and new aerodynamic principles. He faced the problem of complete loss of elevator effectiveness which Yeager experienced during his eighth powered flight as his Mach meter indicated a speed of Mach 0.94 (his true airspeed was in the range of 0.96-0.99 Mach, just below the speed of sound). At that speed, the small research plane stopped responding to all elevator control inputs, leaving the pilot unable to change his pitch angle or to raise or lower the plane's nose. When speed decreased slightly, the problem abruptly disappeared. Analysis suggested that a shock wave was forming along the elevator's hinge line, leaving it ineffective. Ridley determined in that speed range, the elevator itself could safely be dispensed with and the X-1's entire horizontal stabilizer, which could be adjusted for trim changes, be used for pitch control. The idea worked, and Ridley's concept eventually came to be incorporated in all supersonic aircraft--the "flying tail."

Ridley also improvised a vital piece of equipment at the last minute. Two days before taking the X-1 on its first supersonic flight, Yeager broke two ribs in a horseback riding accident. With the aid of an understanding civilian doctor, he was able to conceal his condition from everyone but Ridley. Without the full use of his right arm, however, it would be impossible to seal himself into the tiny X-1 cockpit. Ridley quietly provided a length of broom handle that Yeager was able to use to close the hatch without difficulty.

If Yeager was a superb "intuitive engineer," able to identify the cause of any unexpected event in the air, Ridley was equally skilled in his computational and reasoning abilities. Yeager often called him "the brains behind the whole X-1 test program." All three team members worked well together. All were hands-on types with an instinct to ferret out a practical solution to each problem as soon as it arose. The result was an energetic team of young professionals who fulfilled Colonel Boyd's most exacting expectations and, on October 14, 1947, led the world into the supersonic age. The Air Force recognized his efforts three years later by awarding him the Commendation Ribbon for meritorious achievement.

Ridley worked on the X-1 project until May 1948, when he was sent to the state of Washington for temporary assignment to the XB-47 program. The swept-wing Stratojet, powered by six J-47 turbojet engines and capable of high subsonic speeds, was in its way as revolutionary as the X-1 had been. His expertise proved instrumental in bringing the revolutionary jet bomber to operational status with the Strategic Air Command. A year later, he was permanently assigned to Muroc Army Air Field (soon to be renamed Edwards Air Force Base) where he remained, with interruptions, until 1956.

Returning to Edwards Air Force Base, Ridley applied his reasoning skills to many of the new generation of jet and rocket aircraft then arriving on the ramp: the delta-winged XF-92A, the F-84F Thunderstreak, and the nation's new heavyweight bomber, the B-52. He worked on the entire family of Air Force research airplanes from the X-1 through the variable-sweep wing X-5. His responsibilities included planning flight test programs for various aircraft, identifying the stability characteristics and gathering the performance data which would later be used in writing Pilots Operating Handbooks and compiling standard aircraft characteristic charts.

Ridley corrected a problem with over-sensitive controls on the F-86E Sabre, which was still unsolved after several test flights. Waiting until night had fallen, Ridley led a team of engineers into a darkened hangar. There, he placed a flashlight on the horizontal tail and climbed into the cockpit. The flashlight beam, moving across the hangar door in response to his control inputs, easily revealed a lag problem, which would soon be corrected.

He never really turned off the computational portion of his mind, even when he was absorbed in other work. One evening found him deep in conversation at the officers club, planning the engineering aspects of an upcoming test series with the project pilot for the XF-91 rocket-assisted fighter program. Four master's degree hopefuls from MIT were seated at a nearby table, fretting at their inability to solve a complex problem which they had been assigned. Never breaking the thread of his own conversation, Ridley abruptly handed the students a notepad he had been scribbling on: "Would this help you any?" Cries of joy followed by hearty thumps on his back acknowledged his ingenious solution to their dilemma.

From project engineer, he was selected to be chief of the Test Engineering Branch. From this post he was subsequently promoted to Chief, Flight Test Engineering Laboratory. The responsibility of this division-level organization was to carry out the research and engineering phases of all of the experimental flight test programs assigned to the AFFTC, including overseeing such details as the human factors program and overseeing the weighing and balancing of aircraft. Ridley's new organization included separate branches for Data Reduction, Performance Engineering and Flight Research. It was in this post that he made his longest-lasting contributions to the science of flight testing.

Working with the Flight Test Center's Technical Director, Paul Bikle, he defined the basic flight test techniques that are still used by the Air Force Flight Test Center. Aiming to reduce the increasing length of time and costs required to determine the results of the center's flight tests, they standardized all of its data acquisition methods and set up a centralized Data Processing System. This made it possible for test teams to analyze their test data more rapidly, and to publish their Technical Reports more quickly. He also established training and indoctrination procedures for new military and civilian flight test engineers. Impressing his own long-thought-out ideals upon these changes and goals, Ridley is credited for creating the Flight Test Center's basic philosophy in use today.

By this point in his career, his professional reputation had already spread far afield. Dr. Theodore von Kármán, Chairman of the Advisory Group for Aeronautical Research and Development (AGARD), nominated Ridley to represent the United States on its Flight Test Techniques Panel. AGARD, a Standing Group of the North Atlantic Treaty Organization had been created to bring together the leading aeronautical experts from each of the member nations to find ways to use aviation research and development personnel and facilities for the common benefit of the member nations. Ridley served in this position from 1952 until 1956.

Ridley was promoted to full colonel in 1956 and became a member of the U.S. Military Assistance Advisory Group-Japan.

== Death and legacy ==
Flying as co-pilot in a C-47 over Japan on March 12, 1957, Ridley died at age 41 when the transport crashed into a snow-covered Mt. Shirouma, northwest of Tokyo. In 1980, the Ridley Mission Control Center at Edwards Air Force Base was dedicated in Ridley's honor. In the 1983 film The Right Stuff, Ridley was portrayed, including beyond the time of his death, by Levon Helm. Scenes with the Bell X-1 occurred while Ridley was still alive. However, the scene in which Yeager crashes the Lockheed F-104 Starfighter in 1963 occurred after Ridley's death in the 1957 plane crash.

In 1996, Ridley was inducted into the Aerospace Walk of Honor and was inducted into the National Aviation Hall of Fame in Dayton, Ohio, in 2004. He was survived by his wife, Nell, and son Jack Ridley, Jr. He is buried at Arlington National Cemetery.
