= Frisco Lake =

- Location within Missouri Location within the United States
- Location: Phelps County, Missouri
- Coordinates: 37°57′19″N 91°46′02″W
- Type: lake
- Basin countries: United States
- Surface area: 5 acres (2.0 ha)
- Surface elevation: 1,086 ft (331 m)

Frisco Lake is a small lake in Rolla, Phelps County in the U.S. state of Missouri.

Frisco Lake was both named for and owned by the Frisco Railroad, and is 5 acres (2.0 ha) in area.
