= Fayetteville station (St. Louis–San Francisco Railway) =

- Frisco Depot
- U.S. National Register of Historic Places
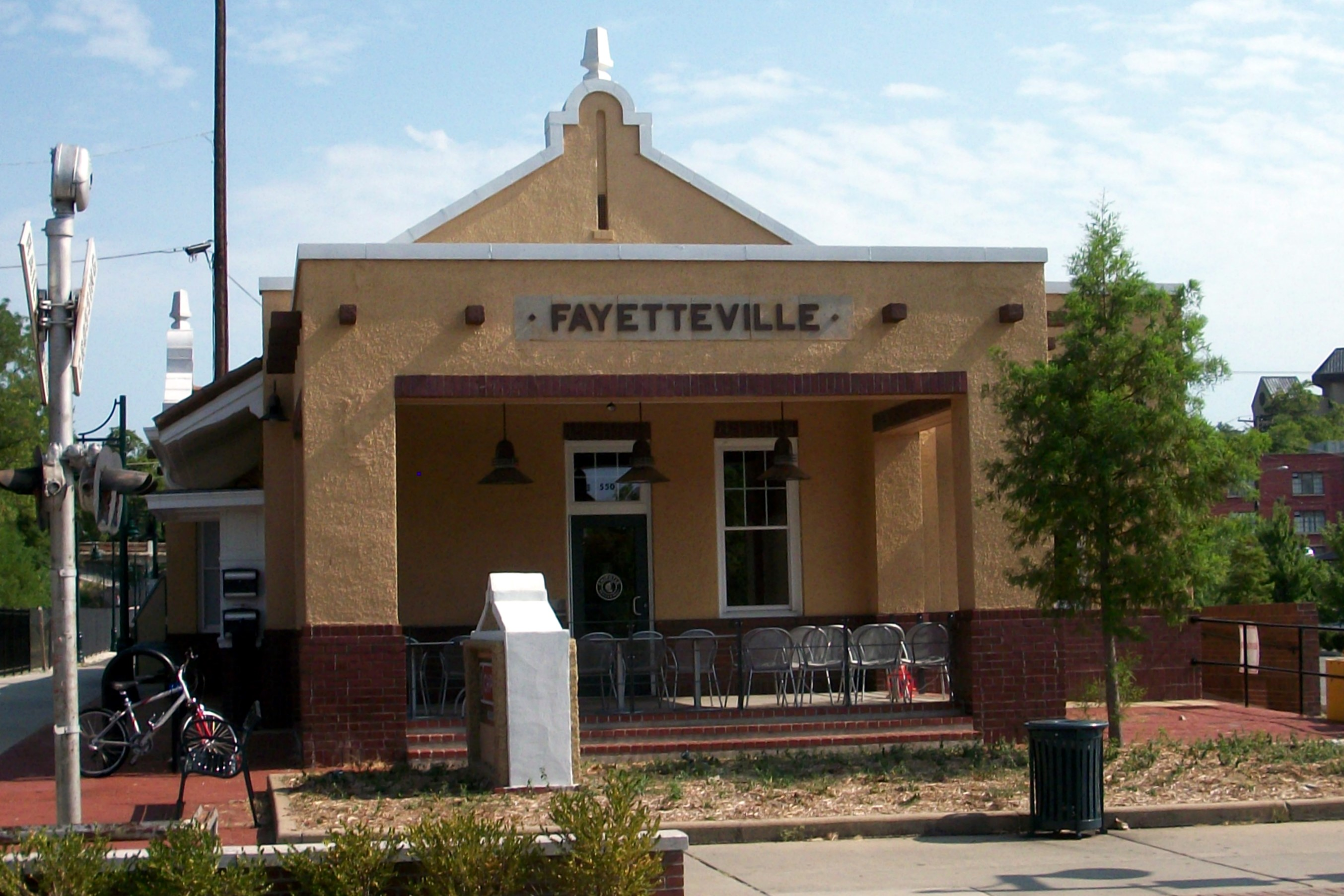

- Location within Arkansas Location within the United States
- Location: 550 W. Dickson Street, Fayetteville, Arkansas
- Coordinates: 36°4′0″N 94°9′17″W
- Area: less than one acre
- Built: 1925
- Architectural style: Mission/Spanish Revival
- NRHP reference No.: 88002819
- Added to NRHP: December 08, 1988

The Frisco Depot (Frisco being a common shortening of the St. Louis – San Francisco Railway) in Fayetteville, Arkansas, is a railroad depot built in 1925. The last passenger trains left Frisco Depot in 1965, and starting in 2011, the depot's interior houses a Chipotle Mexican Grill. The property was listed on the National Register of Historic Places on December 8, 1988.

== History ==
=== Railroads in Northwest Arkansas ===
The North Arkansas and Western Railroad was chartered on November 29, 1899, to connect Fayetteville with nearby Indian Territory. Track was completed to Tahlequah, Oklahoma, under the name Ozark and Cherokee Central Railway, which was based in Fayetteville. This track also connected Fayetteville to Westville, Oklahoma, which gave access to the Kansas City Southern Railway. Now with access to the Kansas City Southern in Westville and the Frisco in Fayetteville, bushels of apples and other fruits grown in the Illinois River Valley south of Fayetteville were able to be shipped elsewhere. The first train arrived in Fayetteville on August 22, 1901.

The tracks were extended west to Fort Gibson and Muskogee, Oklahoma, by 1903 after bridging the Arkansas River. The Ozark and Cherokee Central was leased and later bought by the Frisco. The Frisco also maintained a junction where the St. Paul, Arkansas, rail connected to the main line. This junction was named Fayette Junction and is now within the Fayetteville city limits.

== Location ==
The depot built in 1925 was preceded by two other depots on the same plot. As its predecessors did, the Frisco Depot has served as a place for locals, travelers, and University of Arkansas students to mingle. It is centrally located within Fayetteville on Dickson Street (one of the best-known entertainment districts in Arkansas).

== See also ==
- National Register of Historic Places listings in Washington County, Arkansas

Preceding station	St. Louis–San Francisco Railway	Following station
Van Buren toward Paris	Paris – Monett	Rogers toward Monett
