= Wright City, Oklahoma =

- Town
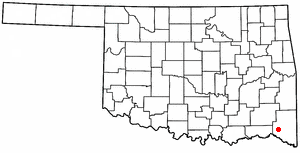
- Location in Oklahoma
- Coordinates: 34°03′53″N 95°00′26″W
- Country: United States
- State: Oklahoma
- County: McCurtain

Area
  - Total: 0.89 sq mi (2.30 km^{2})
  - Land: 0.88 sq mi (2.29 km^{2})
  - Water: 0.0039 sq mi (0.01 km^{2})
- Elevation: 404 ft (123 m)

Population (2020)
  - Total: 616
  - Density: 695.6/sq mi (268.59/km^{2})
- Time zone: UTC-6 (Central (CST))
  - Summer (DST): UTC-5 (CDT)
- ZIP Code: 74766
- Area code: 580
- FIPS code: 40-82200
- GNIS feature ID: 2413514

Wright City is a town in McCurtain County, Oklahoma, United States, along the Little River. The population was 616 at the 2020 census, down from 762 in 2010. Wright City hosts one of the oldest continuous rodeos in Oklahoma, known as Little Cheyenne, held each July 1 through 4. In 1933 a few local cowboys started it as a rodeo, barbecue, and dance. Since 1935, the American Legion, William Wright Post Number 74, has sponsored the event.

Wright City was once home to a Weyerhaeuser plant; it closed permanently in March 2009 due to the slowed lumber industry. The company sold its cardboard product line to International Paper. Weyerhaeuser was Wright City's economic power engine, and its closing affected 165 employees.

== History ==
=== Founding ===
Wright City, formerly known as "Bismark" and "Wright", was founded circa 1909 as the site for a major processing plant of the Choctaw Lumber Company, a subsidiary of the Dierks Lumber and Coal Company, that utilized abundant timber harvested from the region's virgin forests.

At the time of its founding, the community was located in Towson County, a part of the Apukshunnubbee District, one of three administrative super-regions comprising the Choctaw Nation.

=== Etymology ===
On March 24, 1910, a post office charter was issued for Bismark, a name chosen by the Dierks brothers, the company founders, for a Nebraska town where they had operated a lumber outlet. The name of the town and post office changed to Wright during World War I because of public association of the Bismark name with that of the former German chancellor, Otto von Bismarck, despite the discrepancy in spelling. (Note: George Shirk states that this change was made on September 13, 1918.)

The present name was chosen to honor William Wiley Wright, the county's first war casualty. On May 18, 1920, the name was altered to Wright City.

=== Company town ===
The "company town" included a sawmill, planer, railroad maintenance shops, housing stores, a bank, hotel, The Choctaw motion picture theater, a high school with athletic teams known as the LumberJax, an ice factory, and provision for fire and police protection. The lumber conglomerate also provided land for construction of a school and churches. The company, then known as Dierks Forests, Inc., divested itself of residential and other properties unrelated to the primary mission on August 13, 1965. In 1966 the town incorporated and elected its first officials. No longer just a "mill town", citizens took the initiative to create an independent, distinctive municipality. A business district was developed, utilities were upgraded and expanded, and new schools, a community building, and a medical center were built.

In 1969, the Weyerhaeuser Company of Tacoma, Washington, purchased the Dierks's holdings, including the Wright City production complex. Operations continued, remaining the economic base of the community until March 2009, when all operations of the mill ceased due to low demand for lumber and the worsening economy. The town population initially was included in a large census tract and not counted separately until 1950 when the residents numbered 1,121. In the 1920s the population was estimated to be less than five hundred. In 1980 the count stood at 1,168 but by 1990 had decreased to 836. At the turn of the twenty-first century the town had 848 residents. The 2010 census showed a further decline to 762.

=== "Pig tale" ===
In 1956, events in the city raised the eyebrows of newspaper readers around the country. A drought drove pig-herding squatters from nearby hills to release seven or eight hundred hogs – all of them "rail thin" and starving – to graze near the city. Razorbacks ate flower gardens and had to be kicked out of the drugstore. In the Methodist church, a sermon was stopped by the noise of nine pigs fighting in the basement.

== Geography ==
Wright City is in western McCurtain County, 6 miles (10 km) north of Millerton and less than 2 miles (3 km) north of the Little River on State Highway 98. According to the U.S. Census Bureau, the town has a total area of 0.89 square miles (2.31 km^{2}), of which 0.004 square miles (0.010 km^{2}), or 0.45%, are water.

== Demographics ==
Historical population
Census	Pop.	Note	%±
1950	1,121		—
1960	1,161		3.6%
1970	1,068		−8.0%
1980	1,168		9.4%
1990	836		−28.4%
2000	848		1.4%
2010	762		−10.1%
2020	616		−19.2%
U.S. Decennial Census

=== 2020 census ===
As of the 2020 census, Wright City had a population of 616. The median age was 35.3 years. 26.5% of residents were under the age of 18 and 13.8% of residents were 65 years of age or older. For every 100 females there were 90.1 males, and for every 100 females age 18 and over there were 84.1 males age 18 and over.

0.0% of residents lived in urban areas, while 100.0% lived in rural areas.

There were 250 households in Wright City, of which 36.8% had children under the age of 18 living in them. Of all households, 36.4% were married-couple households, 18.0% were households with a male householder and no spouse or partner present, and 38.4% were households with a female householder and no spouse or partner present. About 30.4% of all households were made up of individuals and 13.6% had someone living alone who was 65 years of age or older.

There were 271 housing units, of which 7.7% were vacant. The homeowner vacancy rate was 0.0% and the rental vacancy rate was 10.6%.

Racial composition as of the 2020 census
Race	Number	Percent
White	244	39.6%
Black or African American	35	5.7%
American Indian and Alaska Native	253	41.1%
Asian	1	0.2%
Native Hawaiian and Other Pacific Islander	0	0.0%
Some other race	8	1.3%
Two or more races	75	12.2%
Hispanic or Latino (of any race)	36	5.8%

=== 2000 census ===
As of the census of 2000, there were 848 people, 302 households, and 233 families residing in the town. The population density was 1,017.6 inhabitants per square mile (392.9/km^{2}). There were 326 housing units at an average density of 391.2 per square mile (151.0/km^{2}). The racial makeup of the town was 46.93% White, 7.31% African American, 38.44% Native American, 0.24% from other races, and 7.08% from two or more races. Hispanic or Latino of any race were 2.24% of the population.

There were 302 households, out of which 39.4% had children under the age of 18 living with them, 51.3% were married couples living together, 18.5% had a female householder with no husband present, and 22.8% were non-families. 21.9% of all households were made up of individuals, and 9.6% had someone living alone who was 65 years of age or older. The average household size was 2.81 and the average family size was 3.28.

In the town, the population was spread out, with 32.2% under the age of 18, 6.8% from 18 to 24, 27.4% from 25 to 44, 22.1% from 45 to 64, and 11.6% who were 65 years of age or older. The median age was 33 years. For every 100 females, there were 91.9 males. For every 100 females age 18 and over, there were 87.9 males.

The median income for a household in the town was $29,196, and the median income for a family was $31,917. Males had a median income of $30,694 versus $13,667 for females. The per capita income for the town was $13,032. About 18.2% of families and 19.6% of the population were below the poverty line, including 24.7% of those under age 18 and 22.6% of those age 65 or over.

== Education ==
It is in the Wright City Public Schools school district.
