= Frisco Station, Texas =

Frisco Station is a 242-acre mixed-use development located in the northwest quadrant of the Dallas North Tollway and Warren Parkway in Frisco, Texas.

== History ==
Frisco Station is one of the primary projects that make up Frisco's “$5 Billion Mile,” a name given by the Frisco Economic Development Corp to the one-mile stretch along the Dallas North Tollway that includes four mixed-use developments totaling more than $5 billion in capital investment. It is being developed by Frisco Station Partners.

=== The Hub ===
The development includes office, residential, retail, restaurant and medical space. Frisco Station will include a medical and wellness campus, a regional hub for fitness, retail, luxury restaurants, outdoor spaces for community programming and hiking and biking trails. Development will be centered around a 200,000 square-foot shopping and entertainment district known as "The Hub". The Hub also includes a hotel campus consisting of four hotel brands with over 600 total rooms.

The Hub includes over 5 million square feet of office space, including mid-rise buildings and corporate campuses, and is projected to employ more than 15,000 people. In May 2016, the Frisco Station Partnership announced plans to begin the first phase of development with a seven-story, 228,000-square-foot office building that will include a fitness center and conference facilities. There is also a luxury 16-story hotel, located next to the Ford Center.

=== Ford Center ===
The stadium serves as the new Dallas Cowboys training facility, which is located next door the Cowboys’ headquarters at the Star in Frisco.
