= Idabel, Oklahoma =

Idabel, Oklahoma Bokhoma (Choctaw)
- City and County seat
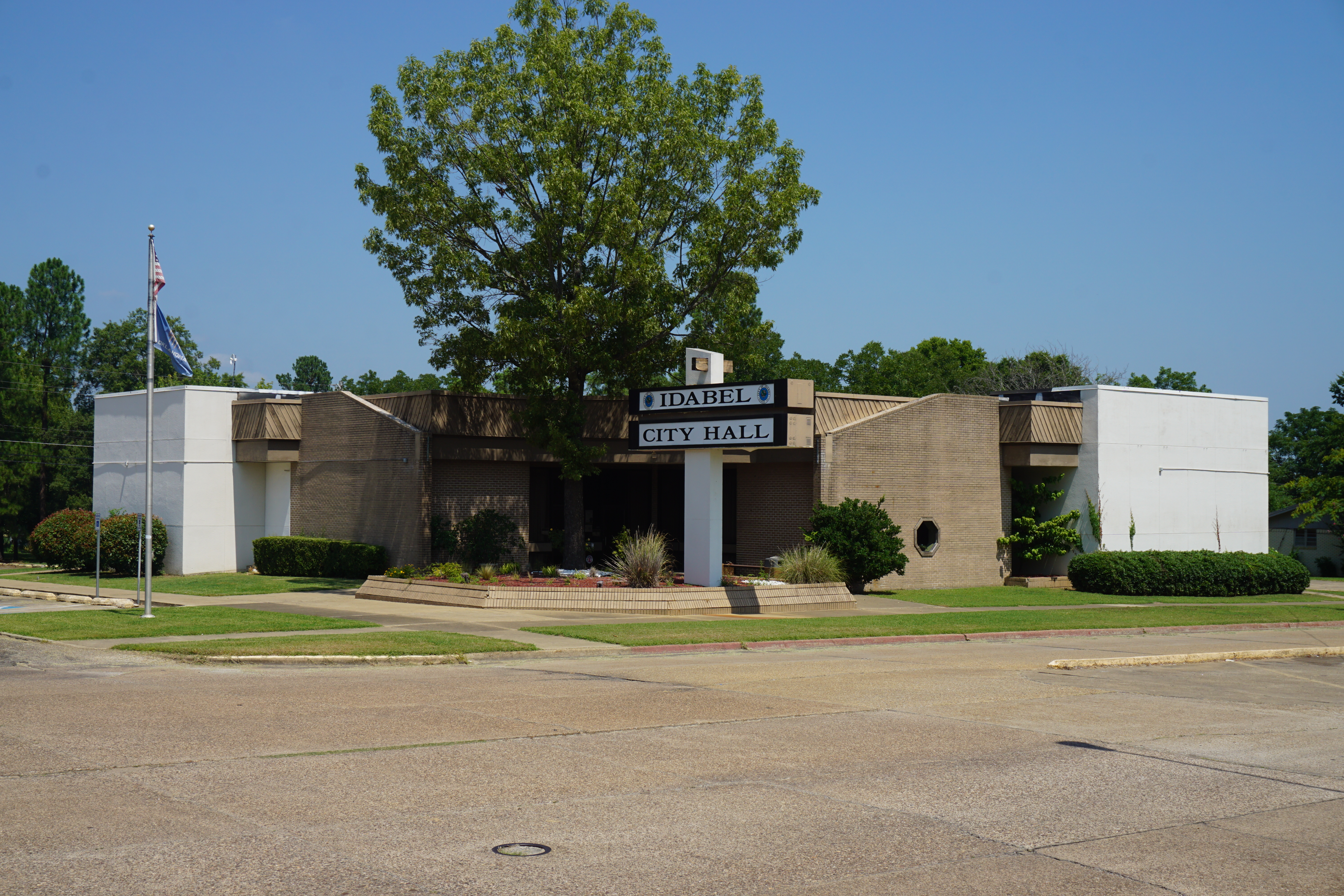
- Idabel City Hall (2018)
- Nickname: Dogwood Capital of Oklahoma
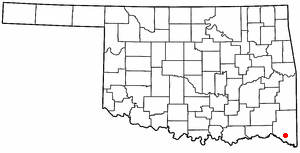
- Location within Oklahoma
- Coordinates: 33°53′44″N 94°49′35″W
- Country: United States
- State: Oklahoma
- County: McCurtain
- Founded: 1902

Government
  - Type: Mayor–Council
  - Mayor: Craig Young

Area
  - Total: 16.75 sq mi (43.38 km^{2})
  - Land: 16.63 sq mi (43.08 km^{2})
  - Water: 0.12 sq mi (0.30 km^{2})
- Elevation: 463 ft (141 m)

Population (2020)
  - Total: 6,961
  - Density: 418.5/sq mi (161.6/km^{2})
- Time zone: UTC−6 (CST)
  - Summer (DST): UTC−5 (CDT)
- ZIP Code: 74745
- Area code: 580
- FIPS code: 40-36750
- GNIS ID: 2410089
- Website: idabel-ok.gov

Idabel is a city in and the county seat of McCurtain County, Oklahoma, United States. As of the 2020 census, the population of the city was 6,961. It is located in Oklahoma's southeast corner, a tourist region known as Choctaw Country.

== History ==
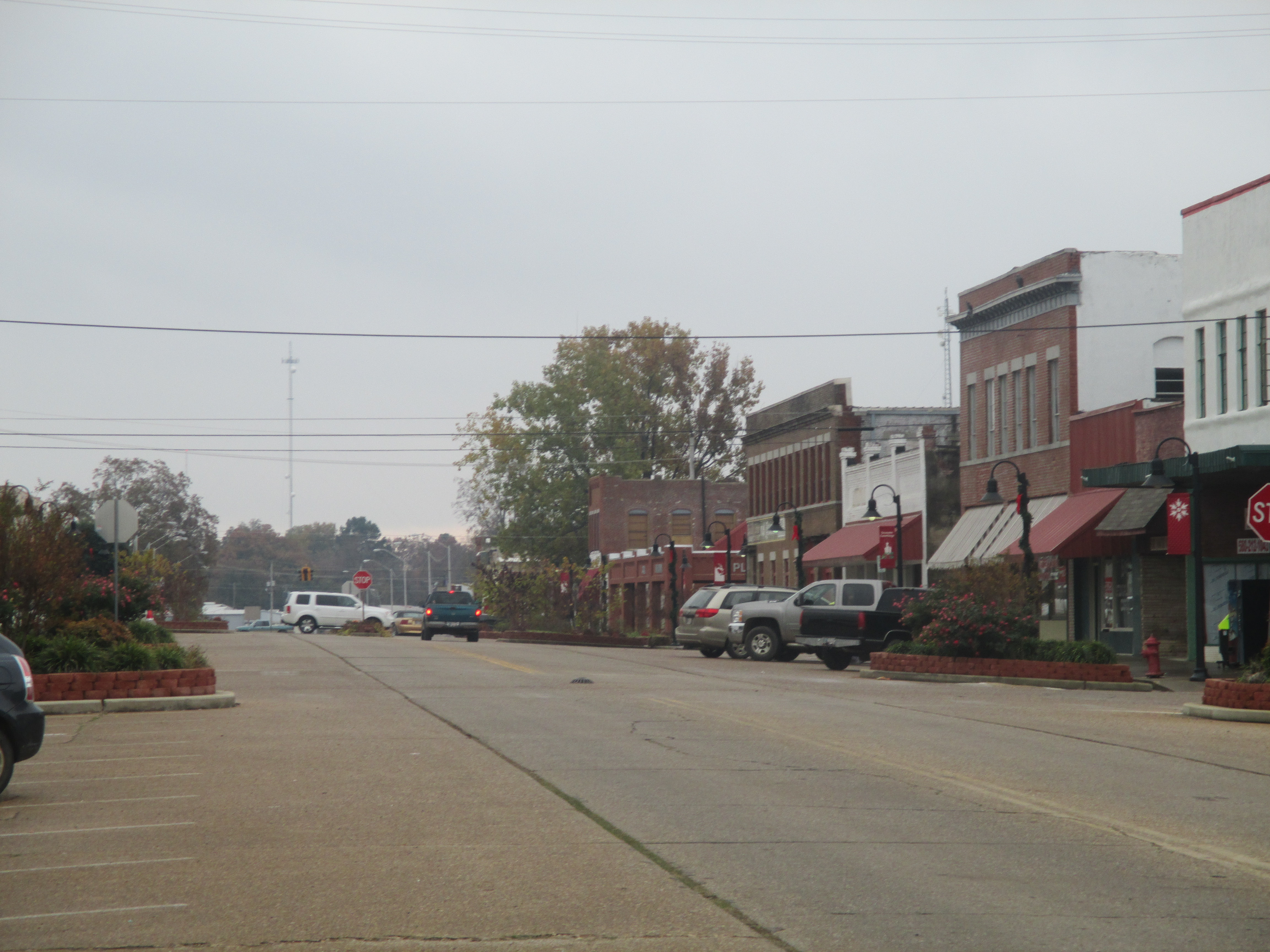
Part of downtown Idabel (2013)

Idabel was established in 1902 as a station by the Arkansas and Choctaw Railway. (This was later part of the St. Louis and San Francisco Railway, and the line is now operated by the Kiamichi Railroad).

The city was first named Purnell, after Isaac Purnell, a railroad official. When postal officials rejected that designation, the name was changed to Mitchell, honoring another railroad company officer. Postal officials rejected that name because another post office of the same name already existed elsewhere in the territory. They named the post office Bokhoma (a Choctaw word meaning Red River); it opened December 15, 1902.

Railroad officials then chose the name Idabel, a compound of the names of Isaac Purnell's two daughters, Ida and Bell. The post office was renamed as Idabel.

At the time of its founding, Idabel was located in Bok Tuklo County, a part of the Apukshunubbee District of the Choctaw Nation, within what was known as Indian Territory.

For the first four years, Idabel local government was conducted by the Choctaw tribe for its people. The federal government had legal jurisdiction in most matters over non-Choctaws. In 1906, the citizens elected their first mayor and established a mayor-council form of government.

At the time of statehood, November 16, 1907, the town was designated as the county seat of McCurtain County. A census in that year reported 726 residents. By 1910, the population had grown to 1,493. In 1920, there were 3,617 residents, but the number fell to 2,581 in 1930. Growth resumed by the end of the Great Depression in the late 1930s.

The death of Henry Lee Johnson in 1980 resulted in a riot in the town that resulted in two deaths.

Idabel residents elected their first African-American mayor in April 2019, mayor Craig Young.

=== 2022 tornado ===
On November 4, 2022, Idabel was hit by a destructive EF4 tornado. The tornado warranted a tornado emergency and was at EF3 strength when it struck the city. It caused heavy damage, mainly to the southeast portion of the city.

== Geography ==
Idabel is in southern McCurtain County, lying between the Little River and the Red River, about 21 miles (34 km) west of the Oklahoma-Arkansas state line and 43 miles (69 km) east of Hugo.

According to the U.S. Census Bureau, the city has an area of 16.8 square miles (44 km^{2}), of which 0.1 square miles (0.3 km^{2}), or 0.70%, are water. The Little River passes 2 miles (3 km) north of the city, and the Red River is 9 miles (14 km) to the south.

=== Climate ===
The climate in this area is characterized by hot, humid summers and generally mild to cool winters. According to the Köppen Climate Classification system, Idabel has a humid subtropical climate, abbreviated "Cfa" on climate maps.

Climate data for Idabel, Oklahoma (1991–2020 normals, extremes 1907–present)
Month	Jan	Feb	Mar	Apr	May	Jun	Jul	Aug	Sep	Oct	Nov	Dec	Year
Record high °F (°C)	87 (31)	89 (32)	94 (34)	97 (36)	99 (37)	107 (42)	111 (44)	114 (46)	109 (43)	101 (38)	89 (32)	83 (28)	114 (46)
Mean maximum °F (°C)	73.7 (23.2)	76.6 (24.8)	83.1 (28.4)	85.9 (29.9)	90.8 (32.7)	95.5 (35.3)	99.9 (37.7)	100.7 (38.2)	96.5 (35.8)	90.2 (32.3)	80.2 (26.8)	73.9 (23.3)	102.0 (38.9)
Mean daily maximum °F (°C)	54.4 (12.4)	58.9 (14.9)	67.3 (19.6)	74.9 (23.8)	81.8 (27.7)	89.1 (31.7)	93.5 (34.2)	93.6 (34.2)	87.1 (30.6)	77.1 (25.1)	65.4 (18.6)	56.7 (13.7)	75.0 (23.9)
Daily mean °F (°C)	41.9 (5.5)	46.3 (7.9)	54.1 (12.3)	61.4 (16.3)	70.2 (21.2)	77.5 (25.3)	81.8 (27.7)	81.3 (27.4)	74.3 (23.5)	63.1 (17.3)	52.2 (11.2)	44.4 (6.9)	62.4 (16.9)
Mean daily minimum °F (°C)	29.4 (−1.4)	33.8 (1.0)	40.9 (4.9)	48.0 (8.9)	58.7 (14.8)	66.0 (18.9)	70.1 (21.2)	68.9 (20.5)	61.4 (16.3)	49.0 (9.4)	39.1 (3.9)	32.2 (0.1)	49.8 (9.9)
Mean minimum °F (°C)	13.2 (−10.4)	18.8 (−7.3)	23.5 (−4.7)	32.0 (0.0)	43.2 (6.2)	56.7 (13.7)	62.8 (17.1)	61.6 (16.4)	47.3 (8.5)	33.6 (0.9)	24.1 (−4.4)	18.2 (−7.7)	10.2 (−12.1)
Record low °F (°C)	−6 (−21)	−12 (−24)	9 (−13)	21 (−6)	31 (−1)	45 (7)	45 (7)	49 (9)	36 (2)	23 (−5)	11 (−12)	−2 (−19)	−12 (−24)
Average precipitation inches (mm)	3.77 (96)	4.09 (104)	5.02 (128)	5.37 (136)	6.35 (161)	4.12 (105)	3.61 (92)	3.03 (77)	4.31 (109)	5.18 (132)	4.68 (119)	4.98 (126)	54.51 (1,385)
Average snowfall inches (cm)	0.6 (1.5)	0.9 (2.3)	0.2 (0.51)	0.0 (0.0)	0.0 (0.0)	0.0 (0.0)	0.0 (0.0)	0.0 (0.0)	0.0 (0.0)	0.0 (0.0)	0.0 (0.0)	0.3 (0.76)	2.0 (5.1)
Average precipitation days (≥ 0.01 in)	8.7	8.5	9.6	8.5	9.9	7.5	6.3	6.6	6.2	8.0	8.2	9.3	97.3
Average snowy days (≥ 0.1 in)	0.3	0.5	0.1	0.0	0.0	0.0	0.0	0.0	0.0	0.0	0.0	0.1	1.0
Source: NOAA

== Demographics ==
Historical population
Census	Pop.	Note	%±
1910	1,493		—
1920	3,067		105.4%
1930	2,581		−15.8%
1940	3,689		42.9%
1950	4,671		26.6%
1960	4,967		6.3%
1970	5,946		19.7%
1980	7,622		28.2%
1990	6,957		−8.7%
2000	7,658		10.1%
2010	7,010		−8.5%
2020	6,961		−0.7%
2021 (est.)	7,004		0.6%
U.S. Decennial Census

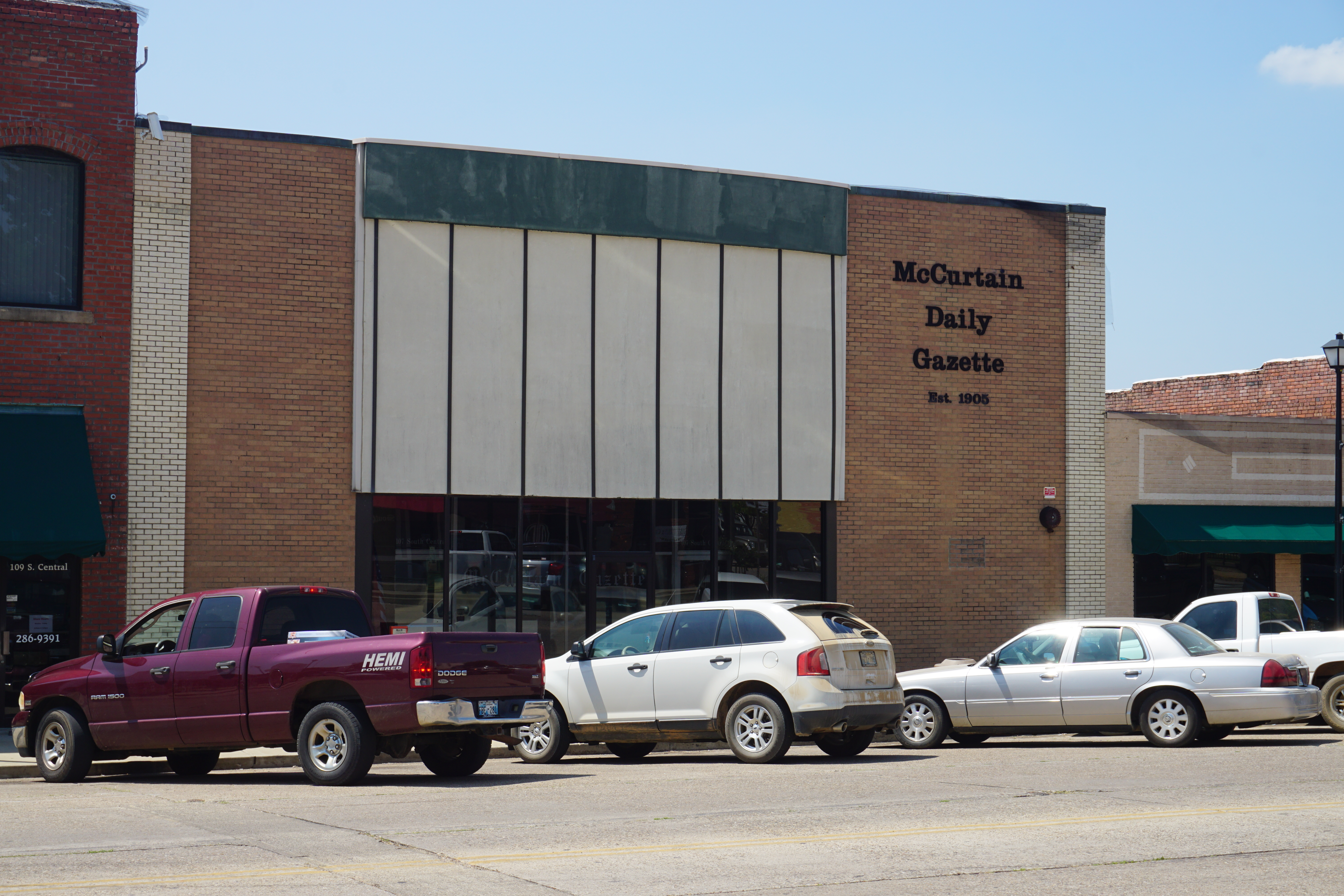
McCurtain Daily Gazette office (2018)

=== 2020 census ===
As of the 2020 census, Idabel had a population of 6,961, 2,721 households, and 1,790 families residing in the city. The median age was 35.1 years; 28.1% of residents were under the age of 18 and 16.8% of residents were 65 years of age or older. For every 100 females there were 89.4 males, and for every 100 females age 18 and over there were 83.4 males age 18 and over.

79.3% of residents lived in urban areas, while 20.7% lived in rural areas.

There were 2,721 households in Idabel, of which 35.0% had children under the age of 18 living in them. Of all households, 34.4% were married-couple households, 18.7% were households with a male householder and no spouse or partner present, and 40.1% were households with a female householder and no spouse or partner present. About 33.3% of all households were made up of individuals and 14.5% had someone living alone who was 65 years of age or older.

There were 3,128 housing units, of which 13.0% were vacant. Among occupied housing units, 51.2% were owner-occupied and 48.8% were renter-occupied. The homeowner vacancy rate was 1.4% and the rental vacancy rate was 12.1%.

Racial composition as of the 2020 census
Race	Percent
White	46.4%
Black or African American	22.6%
American Indian and Alaska Native	10.9%
Asian	0.5%
Native Hawaiian and Other Pacific Islander	1.8%
Some other race	5.6%
Two or more races	12.3%
Hispanic or Latino (of any race)	10.4%

=== 2000 census ===
As of the census of 2000, there were 7,658 people, 2,735 households, and 1,785 families residing in the city. The population density was 436.3 inhabitants per square mile (168.5/km^{2}). There were 3,129 housing units at an average density of 196.4 per square mile (75.8/km^{2}). The racial makeup of the city was 56.99% White, 24.45% African American, 10.44% Native American, 0.30% Asian, 0.01% Pacific Islander, 3.37% from other races, and 4.43% from two or more races. Hispanic or Latino of any race were 4.96% of the population.

There were 2,735 households, out of which 34.4% had children under the age of 18 living with them, 39.6% were married couples living together, 21.2% had a female householder with no husband present, and 34.7% were non-families. 31.6% of all households were made up of individuals, and 12.9% had someone living alone who was 65 years of age or older. The average household size was 2.45 and the average family size was 3.08.

In the city, the population was spread out, with 29.5% under the age of 18, 9.2% from 18 to 24, 26.0% from 25 to 44, 20.7% from 45 to 64, and 14.6% who were 65 years of age or older. The median age was 34 years. For every 100 females, there were 85.6 males. For every 100 females age 18 and over, there were 81.0 males.

The median income for a household in the city was $20,496, and the median income for a family was $24,189. Males had a median income of $24,182 versus $16,958 for females. The per capita income for the city was $12,241. About 28.7% of families and 31.3% of the population were below the poverty line, including 42.5% of those under age 18 and 18.4% of those age 65 or over.

== Economy ==
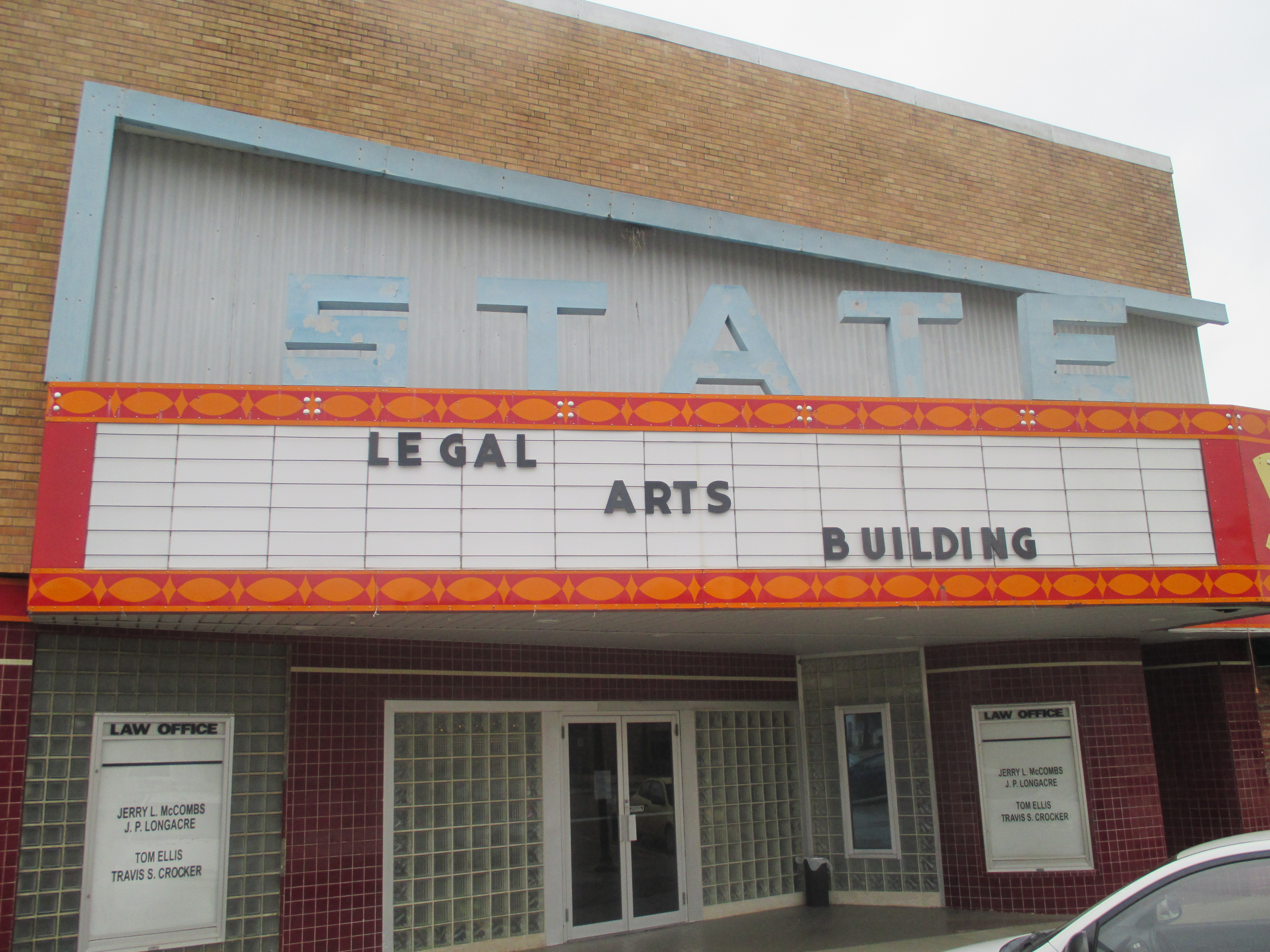
The former State Theater, across from the courthouse, houses a law office, the Legal Arts Building (2013)

Initially, timber was the basis for the local economy, but this was supplanted by cotton production after the nearby forests were cleared. One cotton gin operated in Idabel in 1904, but six were in business in 1930. However, the Great Depression, depleted soil and destructive pests essentially wiped out this industry around Idabel. Landowners converted their properties to pastures and expanded beef production. Chicken farms were also established in the area and marginal agricultural land was turned into pine plantations.

== Parks, recreation and attractions ==
Parks actually within Idabel include Garvin City Park.

Little River National Wildlife Refuge is to the northeast; further to the northeast are Broken Bow Lake, Beavers Bend State Park, Hochatown State Park (now part of Beavers Bend), McCurtain County Game Reserve, and the Carson Creek Recreation Area. To the southeast is the Red Slough Wildlife Management Area.

The Museum of the Red River houses art as well as archaeology, including Acrocanthosaurus atokensis, the Oklahoma State Dinosaur.

The Barnes-Stevenson House is a 1912 restored Victorian house complete with period furnishings, and is on the National Register of Historic Places listings in McCurtain County, Oklahoma. Other Idabel locales on the list include the Frisco Station, the Idabel Armory, the Rouleau Hotel, and the Spaulding-Olive House.

== Education ==
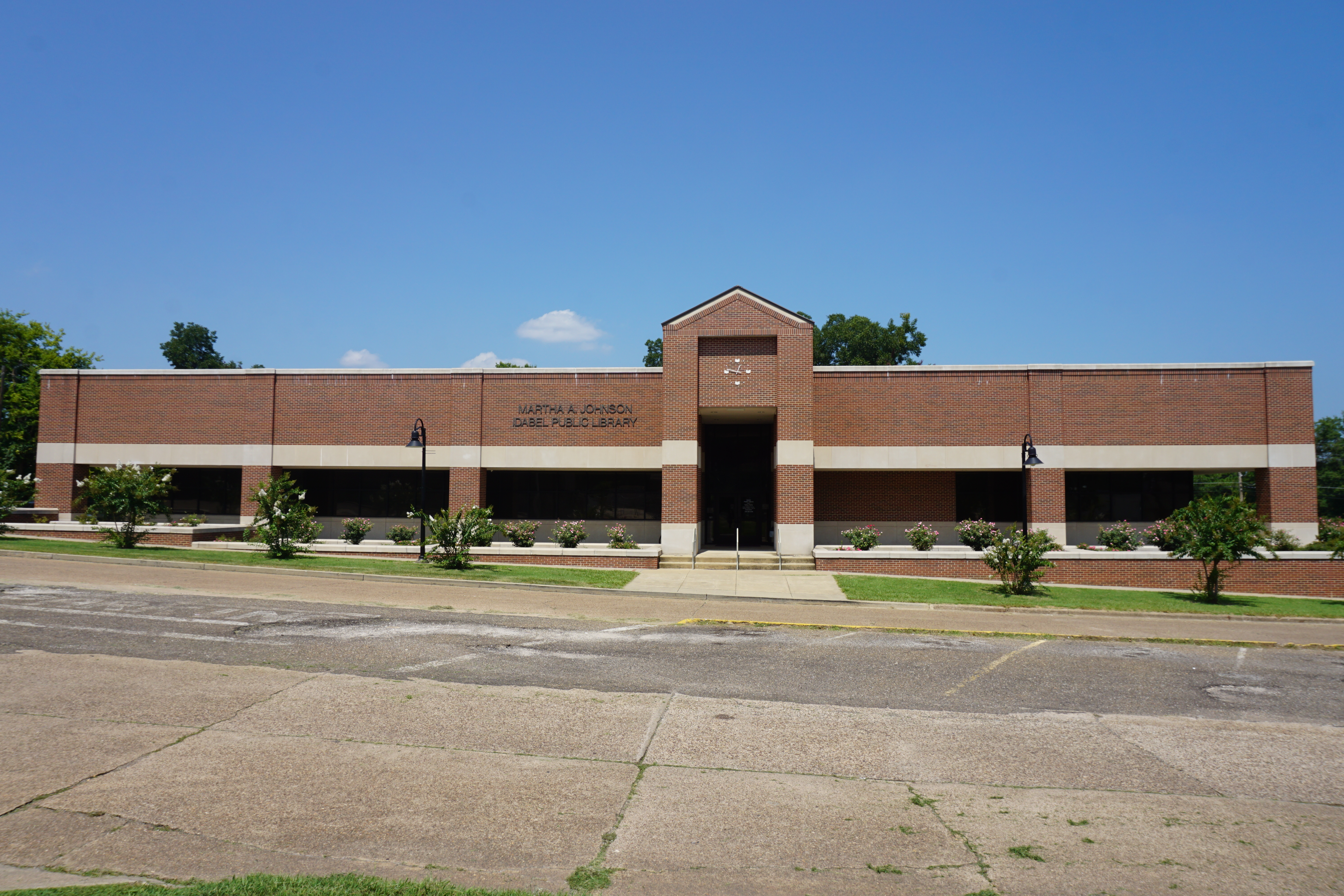
Martha A. Johnson Library (2018)

=== Public schools ===
The majority of the municipality is in the Idabel Public Schools school district.

- Idabel High School - Grades 9–12
- Idabel Middle School - Grades 6–8
- Central Elementary - Grades 3–5
- Idabel Primary South - Grades 1–2 PRE-K–K
- EvenStart - Ages 2–4
- Southeast Elementary - pre-k–4–Adult Ed
- Denison Elementary - Pre-Kindergarten - 8th

Portions are in the following elementary school districts: Forest Grove Public School and Denison Public School.

=== Advanced education ===
- Kiamichi Technology Center
- Southeastern Oklahoma State University, McCurtain County campus (formerly called the ET Dunlap Center)
- Eastern Oklahoma State College

== Transportation ==
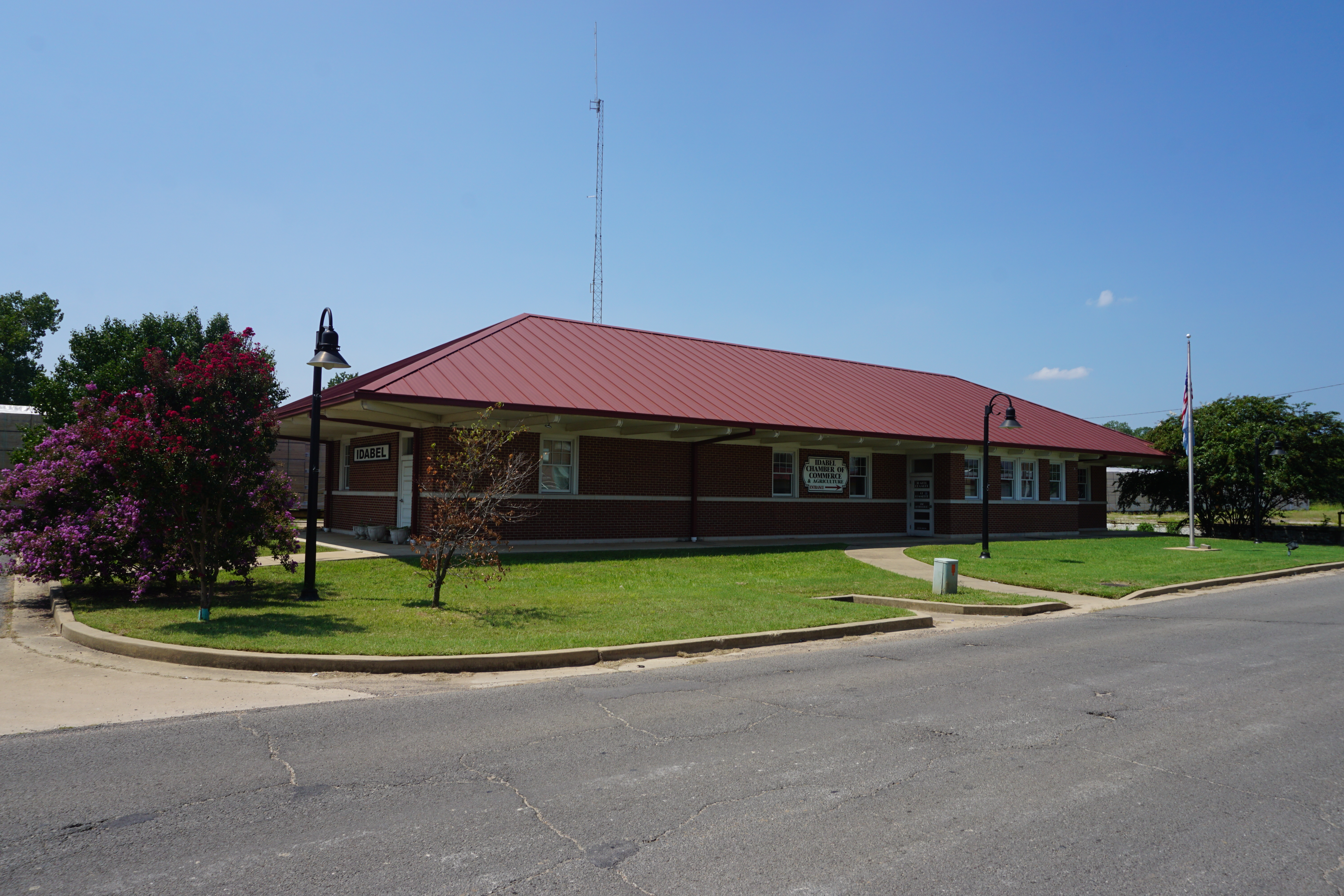
Idabel train station, aka Frisco Station (2018)

Idabel is served by US-259, US-70, SH-3, and SH-37.

McCurtain County Regional Airport (FAA ID: 4O4) is 2 miles (3 km) northwest of Idabel, and features a 5,002-by-75-foot (1,525 by 23 m) paved runway.

Commercial air transportation is available out of Texarkana Regional Airport, about 73 miles southeast.

Idabel has rail freight service through the Kiamichi Railroad.

== Notable people ==
- Phillip Balisle, Vice Admiral in United States Navy
- Randall Burks, former professional football player
- Ray Burris, professional baseball player
- Hadley Caliman, jazz musician
- Robert Evans, podcaster and journalist
- Earl Grant, organist
- Larzette Hale-Wilson, first Black woman in US to earn a PhD in accounting and the first Black female CPA in the state of Georgia.
- Jeff Keith, lead singer for the rock band Tesla
- Sunny Murray, jazz drummer, composer and band leader
- Harold Stevenson, artist (1929–2018)
- Countess Vaughn, actress

== See also ==
- Kill. Bury. Print. - 2026 American documentary film about journalism, press intimidation, and corrupt police in Idabel.
