= Garvin, Oklahoma =

- Town
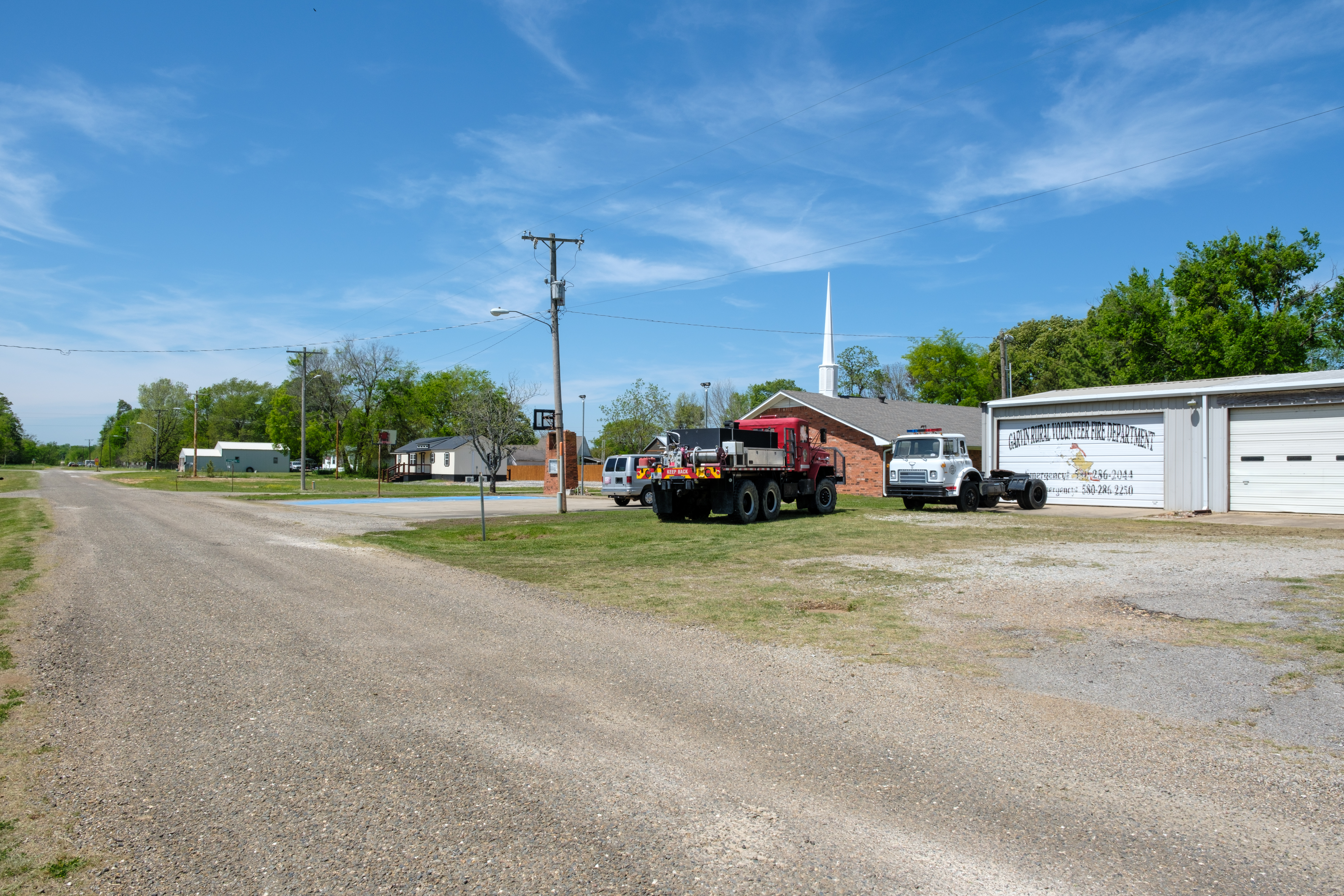

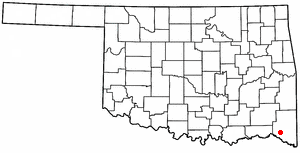
- Location in Oklahoma
- Coordinates: 33°57′22″N 94°56′09″W
- Country: United States
- State: Oklahoma
- County: McCurtain

Area
  - Total: 1.90 sq mi (4.93 km^{2})
  - Land: 1.90 sq mi (4.92 km^{2})
  - Water: 0 sq mi (0.00 km^{2})
- Elevation: 502 ft (153 m)

Population (2020)
  - Total: 177
  - Density: 93.1/sq mi (35.95/km^{2})
- Time zone: UTC-6 (Central (CST))
  - Summer (DST): UTC-5 (CDT)
- ZIP Codes: 74736 (Garvin); 74745 (Idabel)
- Area code: 580
- FIPS code: 40-28700
- GNIS feature ID: 2412671

Garvin is a town in McCurtain County, Oklahoma, United States. The population was 177 at the 2020 census, down from 256 in 2010.

== History ==
Garvin began as a trading post in the Choctaw Nation, approximately 1.5 miles (2.4 km) southeast of the present community bearing the same name. A post office named Garvin was established at the trading post on February 19, 1894. James W. Kirk, owner of the trading post, was the first postmaster, and chose to name the post office "Garvin", after his father-in-law, Isaac L. Garvin, who had been chief of the Choctaw Nation from 1878 to 1880.

At the time of its founding, Garvin was located in Bok Tuklo County, a part of the Apukshunnubbee District of the Choctaw Nation.

In 1902, the Choctaw Land Commission selected a new site along the railroad that was being constructed across what would become McCurtain County. The 126-acre (51 ha) site, which would reclaim the name Garvin, was halfway between Valliant and Purnell (later renamed Idabel). The new Garvin began to develop rapidly. The first newspaper to serve that part of the country was the Garvin Graphic, which began publishing in 1903. A school opened in September 1904, with an enrollment of 50 students. A cotton gin began operation in the same year. In 1905, Garvin had a telephone system. The town had a population of 800 in 1906; 15 stores had opened by then and several professional people (e.g., doctors and lawyers) had established practices.

Statehood caused the dissolution of the Choctaw Nation as a political entity, replaced by the creation of several counties of the new state of Oklahoma. Garvin fell within the boundaries of McCurtain County. Idabel was chosen as the county seat, although Garvin then had the larger population. Its economic base was forest products, because of the dense forests in its vicinity. The town had several wood processing businesses, creating job opportunities. There was a large sawmill, a veneering plant, a barrel hoop plant and a barrel stave plant. Whole logs could be shipped to other markets over several miles of a tramway that led south toward the Red River. Garvin's population rose to a peak of 957 in 1910, then dropped to only 293 at the 1920 census. (Note: The steep decline between 1910 and 1920 largely resulted from the heavy use of nearby forests. Agriculture, especially cotton farming, supplanted wood products, as a primary source of jobs around Garvin. The Great Depression added further economic woes. Many of the former Garvin residents moved to Idabel seeking work.) Garvin never regained its previous growth. Meanwhile, its local rival Idabel had surged ahead to a 1910 population of 1,493 and continued growth, with a total of 3,067 residents in 1920.

== Geography ==
Garvin is in southwestern McCurtain County along U.S. Route 70, which leads southeast 8 miles (13 km) to Idabel, the county seat, and northwest 4 miles (6 km) to Millerton. According to the U.S. Census Bureau, Garvin has an area of 1.9 square miles (4.9 km^{2}), of which 0.002 square miles (0.005 km^{2}), or 0.1%, are water. It is approximately 1.5 miles (2.4 km) south of the Little River, an east-flowing tributary of the Red River.

== Demographics ==
Historical population
Census	Pop.	Note	%±
1910	957		—
1920	293		−69.4%
1930	263		−10.2%
1940	170		−35.4%
1950	155		−8.8%
1960	109		−29.7%
1970	117		7.3%
1980	162		38.5%
1990	128		−21.0%
2000	143		11.7%
2010	256		79.0%
2020	177		−30.9%
U.S. Decennial Census

=== 2020 census ===
As of the 2020 census, Garvin had a population of 177. The median age was 38.5 years. 27.1% of residents were under the age of 18 and 13.6% of residents were 65 years of age or older. For every 100 females there were 115.9 males, and for every 100 females age 18 and over there were 115.0 males age 18 and over.

0.0% of residents lived in urban areas, while 100.0% lived in rural areas.

There were 70 households in Garvin, of which 41.4% had children under the age of 18 living in them. Of all households, 44.3% were married-couple households, 20.0% were households with a male householder and no spouse or partner present, and 28.6% were households with a female householder and no spouse or partner present. About 18.6% of all households were made up of individuals and 12.9% had someone living alone who was 65 years of age or older.

There were 80 housing units, of which 12.5% were vacant. The homeowner vacancy rate was 0.0% and the rental vacancy rate was 9.5%.

Racial composition as of the 2020 census
Race	Number	Percent
White	121	68.4%
Black or African American	6	3.4%
American Indian and Alaska Native	27	15.3%
Asian	0	0.0%
Native Hawaiian and Other Pacific Islander	0	0.0%
Some other race	6	3.4%
Two or more races	17	9.6%
Hispanic or Latino (of any race)	8	4.5%

=== 2000 census ===
As of the census of 2000, there were 143 people, 53 households, and 39 families residing in this town. The population density was 471.2 inhabitants per square mile (181.9/km^{2}). There were 57 housing units at an average density of 187.8 per square mile (72.5/km^{2}). The racial makeup of the town was 88.11% White, 9.09% Native American, and 2.80% from two or more races.

There were 53 households, out of which 34.0% had children under the age of 18 living with them, 58.5% were married couples living together, 11.3% had a female householder with no husband present, and 26.4% were non-families. 22.6% of all households were made up of individuals, and 9.4% had someone living alone who was 65 years of age or older. The average household size was 2.70 and the average family size was 3.15.

In the town, the population was spread out, with 33.6% under the age of 18, 4.9% from 18 to 24, 32.2% from 25 to 44, 18.2% from 45 to 64, and 11.2% who were 65 years of age or older. The median age was 32 years. For every 100 females, there were 93.2 males. For every 100 females age 18 and over, there were 93.9 males.

The median income for a household in the town was $29,375, and the median income for a family was $30,833. Males had a median income of $23,125 versus $19,375 for females. The per capita income for the town was $11,633. There were 8.3% of families and 10.0% of the population living below the poverty line, including 16.3% of under eighteens and 27.3% of those over 64.

== Education ==
The school district is an elementary school district, the Forest Grove Public School District, which operates Forest Grove Public School.

== Notable people ==
- Blanche Barrow, born Bennie Caldwell, married to Buck Barrow, who was the brother of Clyde Barrow (Bonnie and Clyde)
- Jack Ridley, aeronautical engineer, USAF test pilot and chief of the U.S. Air Force's Flight Test Engineering Laboratory
