= Idabel station =

- Frisco Station
- U.S. National Register of Historic Places
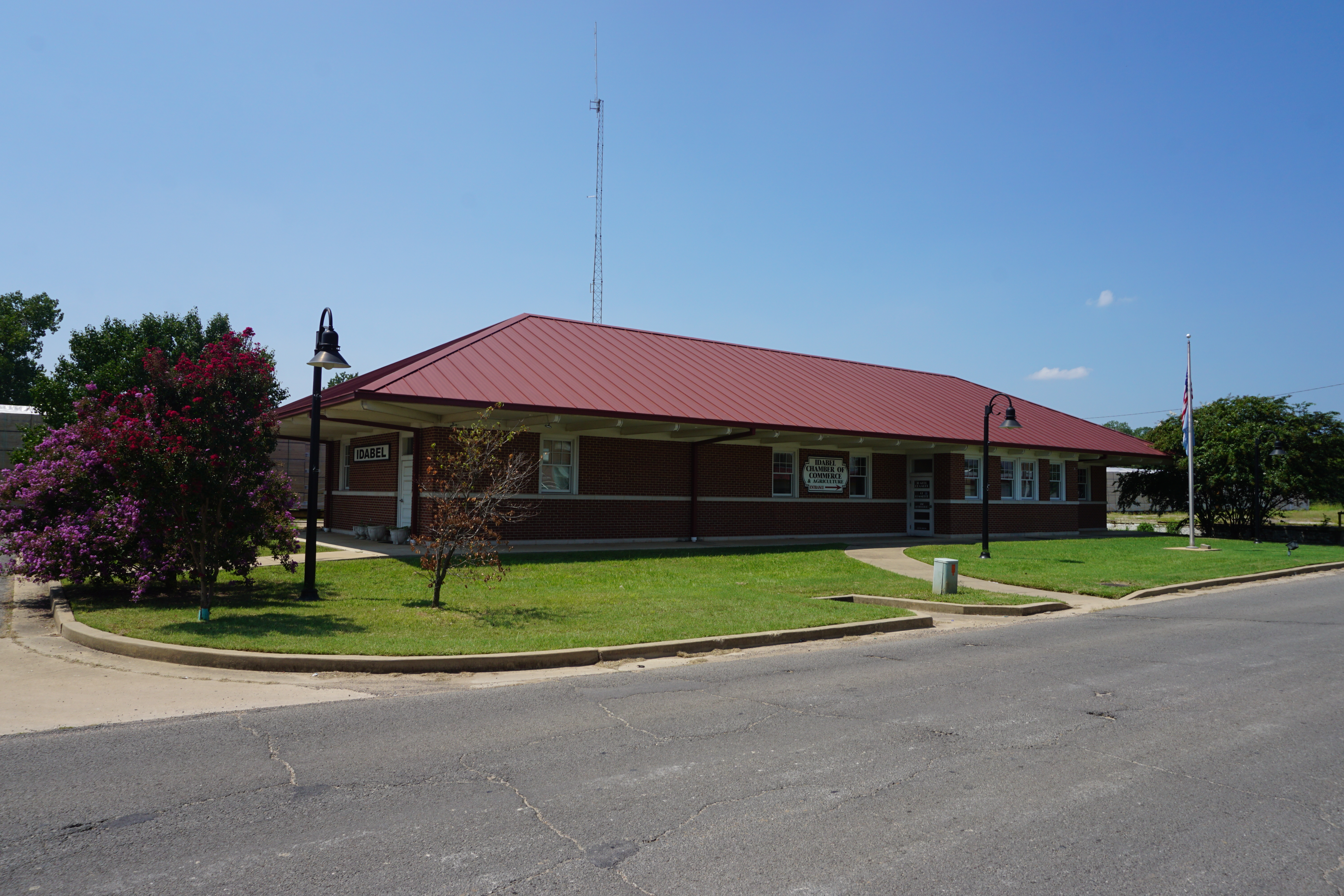

- Location within Oklahoma Location within the United States
- Location: Texas Ave., Idabel, Oklahoma
- Coordinates: 33°53′40″N 94°49′45″W
- Built: 1912
- Built by: Vanderslip, E.M. & Co.
- Website: www.theidabelchamber.com
- NRHP reference No.: 79003137
- Added to NRHP: May 21, 1979

Idabel station, also known as Frisco Station, is a train station that was built in 1912 by the St. Louis–San Francisco Railway in Idabel, Oklahoma. It replaced an earlier frame structure that had been constructed in 1902. It was listed on the U.S. National Register of Historic Places in 1979. Today it is the headquarters of the Idabel Chamber of Commerce and Agriculture.

== Description ==
The building footprint is 102 feet (31 m) long by 24 feet (7.3 m) wide. The walls are red brick, and the entire building is covered with a clay tile roof. The roof has eyelid dormers on the north and south faces. A notable feature is that the eaves have an unusually wide 8 foot (2.4 m) overhang beyond the walls, because of the relatively high rainfall in this part of Oklahoma. It cost $10,000 to construct in 1912, and was built by the E. M. Vanderslip and Company of Oklahoma City.

== NRHP listing ==
At the time the NRHP application was submitted, the station was still owned by the Frisco Railroad, which was using the building as a freight office with a one-man staff. However, the company was already planning to close the office, in which case it would demolish the structure to eliminate future maintenance costs. The Idabel Chamber of Commerce has moved into the building since then.

The McCurtain County Historical Society argued the building was the center of commercial and social activity for Idabel for 40 years, being the host of four passenger trains daily and also of freight trains, while there were no other common carriers serving Idabel. "Idabel" itself is named for Ida and Belle Purnell, daughters of a railway official.

Preceding station	St. Louis–San Francisco Railway	Following station
Garvin toward Ardmore	Ardmore – Hope	Duval toward Hope
