= National Register of Historic Places listings in Sevier County, Arkansas =

Location of Sevier County in Arkansas

Sevier County, Arkansas, United States, has 18 properties listed on the National Register of Historic Places. Two sites that were once listed have been removed.

The locations of National Register properties for which the latitude and longitude coordinates are included below may be seen in a map.

Contents: Counties in Arkansas
- Arkansas
- Ashley
- Baxter
- Benton
- Boone
- Bradley
- Calhoun
- Carroll
- Chicot
- Clark
- Clay
- Cleburne
- Cleveland
- Columbia
- Conway
- Craighead
- Crawford
- Crittenden
- Cross
- Dallas
- Desha
- Drew
- Faulkner
- Franklin
- Fulton
- Garland
- Grant
- Greene
- Hempstead
- Hot Spring
- Howard
- Independence
- Izard
- Jackson
- Jefferson
- Johnson
- Lafayette
- Lawrence
- Lee
- Lincoln
- Little River
- Logan
- Lonoke
- Madison
- Marion
- Miller
- Mississippi
- Monroe
- Montgomery
- Nevada
- Newton
- Ouachita
- Perry
- Phillips
- Pike
- Poinsett
- Polk
- Pope
- Prairie
- Pulaski (Little Rock)
- Randolph
- St. Francis
- Saline
- Scott
- Searcy
- Sebastian
- Sevier
- Sharp
- Stone
- Union
- Van Buren
- Washington
- White
- Woodruff
- Yell

This National Park Service list is complete through NPS recent listings posted August 7, 2026.

== Current listings ==
	Name on the Register	Image	Date listed	Location	City or town	Description
1	Bishop Brookes House	Bishop Brookes House	November 18, 1999 (#99001352)	407 N. 6th St. 34°02′23″N 94°20′39″W	De Queen	
2	DeQueen & Eastern Railroad Machine Shop	DeQueen & Eastern Railroad Machine Shop	June 20, 1996 (#96000643)	Northwestern edge of the De Queen and Eastern railroad yard, adjacent to Highway 329; 34°02′08″N 94°19′59″W	De Queen	part of the Railroad Era Resources of Southwest Arkansas Multiple Property Submission (MPS)
3	De Queen & Eastern Railroad Overpass		May 19, 2023 (#100008976)	US 71 over the De Queen & Eastern RR Line; 33°58′12″N 94°10′06″W	Lockesburg	
4	DeQueen Commercial Historic District	DeQueen Commercial Historic District	January 26, 2012 (#11001051)	Roughly bounded by W. DeQueen Ave., N. 2nd St., W. Stilwell Ave. & N. 4th Ave. 34°02′14″N 94°20′25″W	De Queen	
5	First Presbyterian Church	First Presbyterian Church	December 1, 1994 (#94001419)	Southwestern corner of the junction of Vandervoort and N. 5th Sts. 34°02′24″N 94°20′34″W	De Queen	
6	First United Methodist Church	First United Methodist Church	May 19, 1994 (#94000468)	East of the junction of 2nd St. and 5th Ave. 33°58′05″N 94°09′55″W	Lockesburg	
7	Gillham City Jail	Gillham City Jail	January 27, 2012 (#11001052)	Approximately 325 feet (99 m) southeast of Hornberg Ave. & Front St. 34°10′07″N 94°18′51″W	Gillham	
8	Goff and Gamble Merchandise Store	Goff and Gamble Merchandise Store	June 20, 1996 (#96000646)	1 block north of the Kansas City Southern railroad tracks in the center of Gillham; 34°10′08″N 94°18′54″W	Gillham	part of the Railroad Era Resources of Southwest Arkansas MPS
9	Hale Creek Bridge	Hale Creek Bridge	May 26, 2004 (#04000489)	County Road 271; 34°04′47″N 94°11′09″W	Red Wing	part of the Historic Bridges of Arkansas MPS
10	Hayes Hardware Store	Hayes Hardware Store	December 3, 1980 (#80000787)	314 DeQueen St. 34°02′16″N 94°20′27″W	De Queen	
11	King Schoolhouse	King Schoolhouse	June 20, 1996 (#96000645)	Approximately 1 mile (1.6 km) east of U.S. Highway 71 near central King; 34°08′51″N 94°17′58″W	King	part of the Railroad Era Resources of Southwest Arkansas MPS
12	Little Bear Creek Bridge		May 22, 2026 (#100013025)	East Stilwell Avenue over Little Bear Creek; 34°02′03″N 94°18′36″W	De Queen	
13	Little Cossatot River Bridge	Little Cossatot River Bridge	April 6, 1990 (#90000538)	County Road 139H over the Little Cossatot River; 33°58′29″N 94°12′18″W	Lockesburg	part of the Historic Bridges of Arkansas MPS
14	Lockesburg High School Gymnasium		May 18, 2018 (#100002458)	128 E Main St. 33°58′02″N 94°10′04″W	Lockesburg	
15	Lockesburg Waterworks	Lockesburg Waterworks	September 20, 2007 (#07000964)	Junction of Hickory and Azalea Sts. 33°58′07″N 94°10′01″W	Lockesburg	part of the New Deal Recovery Efforts in Arkansas MPS
16	Oak Grove Rosenwald School	Oak Grove Rosenwald School	May 26, 2004 (#04000494)	Oak Grove Rd. 33°53′11″N 94°08′00″W	Oak Grove	
17	Old US 71-Little River Approach	Old US 71-Little River Approach	May 26, 2004 (#04000493)	Ashely Camp Rd. from the northern bank of the Little River to south of the old U.S. Highway 71 and Highway 27; 33°47′41″N 94°08′39″W	Ben Lomond	part of the Arkansas Highway History and Architecture MPS
18	Otis Theodore and Effiegene Locke Wingo House	Otis Theodore and Effiegene Locke Wingo House	June 1, 2004 (#04000501)	510 W. De Queen Ave. 34°02′22″N 94°20′39″W	De Queen	

== Former listings ==
	Name on the Register	Image	Date listed	Date removed	Location	City or town	Description
1	Hotel Dee Swift		June 20, 1996 (#96000644)	January 25, 2010	123 N. Port Arthur St. 34°02′15″N 94°20′13″W	De Queen	
2	Locke-Nall House		May 1, 1989 (#89000340)	September 25, 2012	Off U.S. Highways 59/71 north of Lockesburg; 33°58′30″N 94°10′33″W	Lockesburg	

== See also ==
- List of National Historic Landmarks in Arkansas
- National Register of Historic Places listings in Arkansas
