= Hale Creek Bridge =

- U.S. National Register of Historic Places
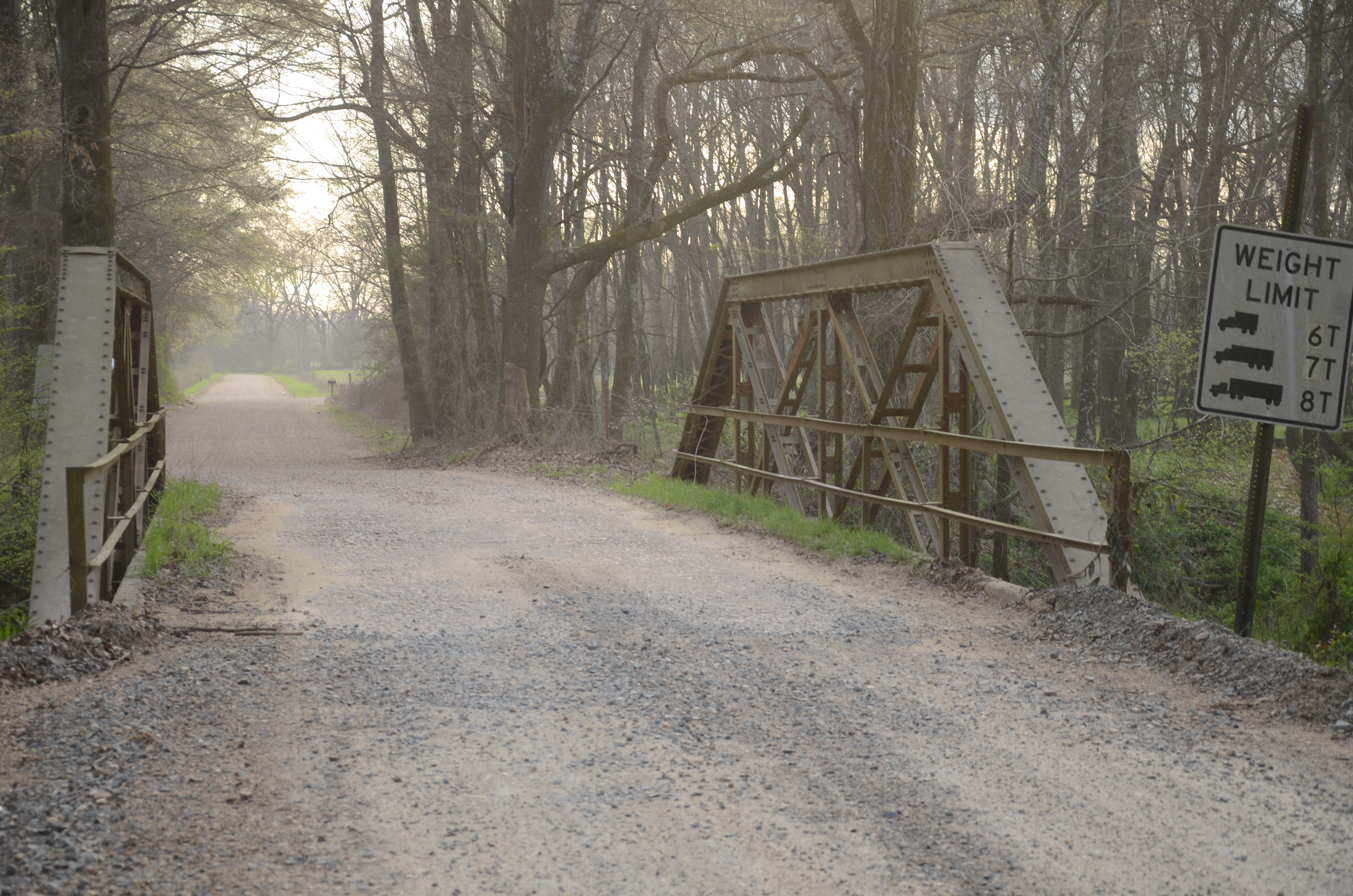

- Location within Arkansas Location within the United States
- Nearest city: Red Wing, Arkansas
- Coordinates: 34°4′47″N 94°11′9″W
- Area: less than one acre
- Built: 1919
- Architectural style: Pratt pony-truss
- MPS: Historic Bridges of Arkansas MPS
- NRHP reference No.: 04000489
- Added to NRHP: May 26, 2004

The Hale Creek Bridge is a historic bridge carrying County Road 271 (a.k.a. Fletcher Road) over Hale Creek in Sevier County, Arkansas, near the village of Red Wing and about halfway between De Queen and Dierks. It consists of a single-span Pratt pony truss 30 feet (9.1 m) long, resting on concrete abutments. The bridge deck is 18 feet (5.5 m) wide and is surfaced in gravel. When the bridge was built in 1919, the roadway it carried was the major east–west route in the area. In 1926 this route was designated U.S. Route 70. It retained this designation until the current alignment of US 70 was built in 1952. The bridge is a fine local example of a Pratt truss bridge.

The bridge was listed on the National Register of Historic Places in 2004.

== See also ==
- National Register of Historic Places listings in Sevier County, Arkansas
- List of bridges on the National Register of Historic Places in Arkansas
