= Hayes Hardware Store =

- U.S. National Register of Historic Places
- U.S. Historic district – Contributing property
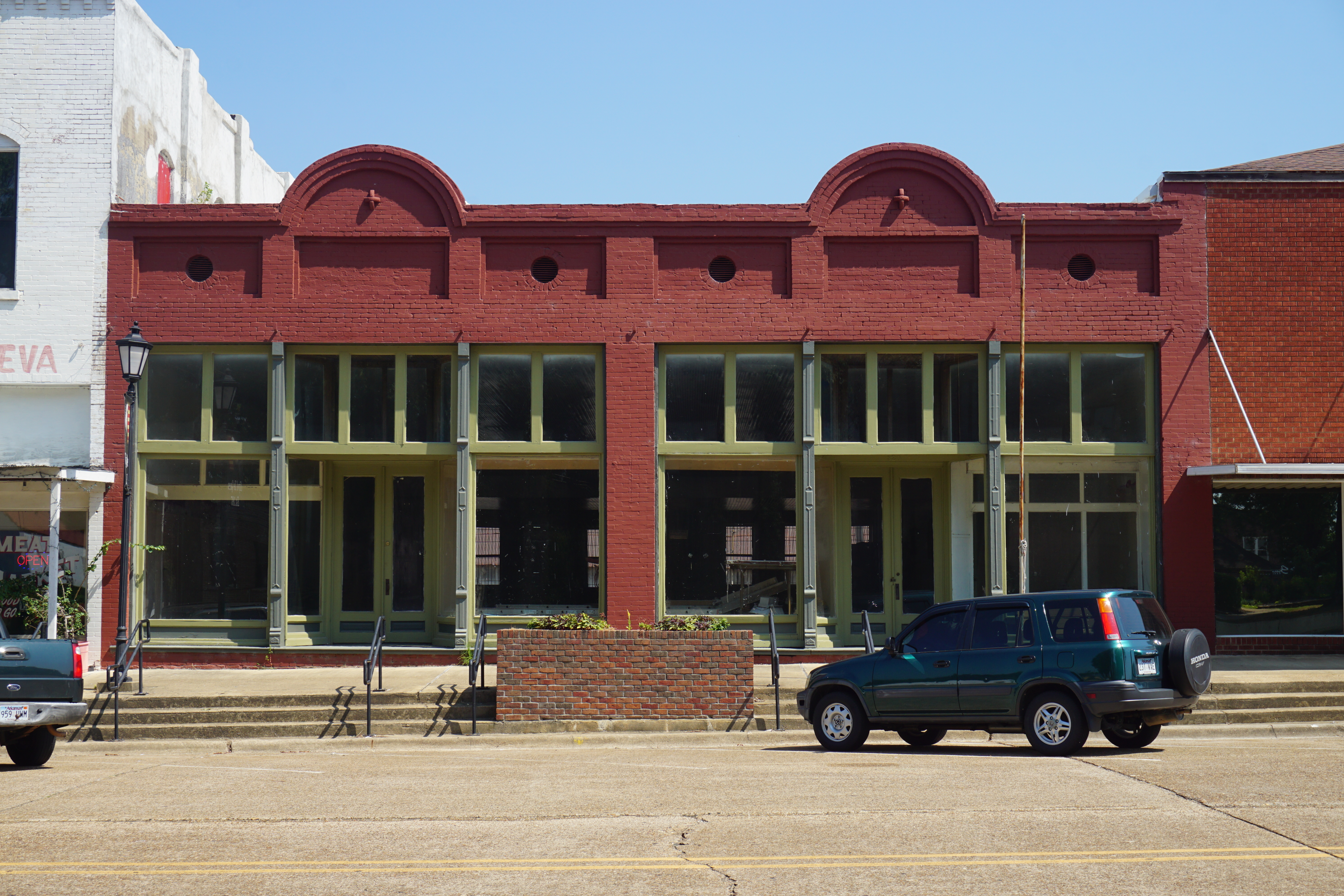

- Location within Arkansas Location within the United States
- Location: 314 DeQueen St., DeQueen, Arkansas
- Coordinates: 34°2′16″N 94°20′27″W
- Area: 1 acre (0.40 ha)
- Built: 1900
- Part of: DeQueen Commercial Historic District (ID11001051)
- NRHP reference No.: 80000787

Significant dates
- Added to NRHP: December 3, 1980
- Designated CP: January 26, 2012

The Hayes Hardware Store is a historic commercial building at 314 DeQueen Street in downtown De Queen, Arkansas. It is a brick 1 1/2-story structure, sharing party walls with adjoining buildings on either side. Its brick facade is divided into two three-bay sections, with brick pilasters at the ends and in the center. Above the first-floor storefront windows is a clerestory level, above which is an attic space, where each of the six bays has a small oculus window. Above the second and fifth bays (the center bays of each group of three) is a rounded arch. The building was built c. 1900 by the Dierks Lumber and Coal Company, which built the De Queen and Eastern Railroad, making the city the commercial center of Sevier County. The building was acquired in 1908 by the Hayes Hardware Company.

The building was listed on the National Register of Historic Places in 1980.

== See also ==
- National Register of Historic Places listings in Sevier County, Arkansas
