= Gillham City Jail =

- U.S. National Register of Historic Places
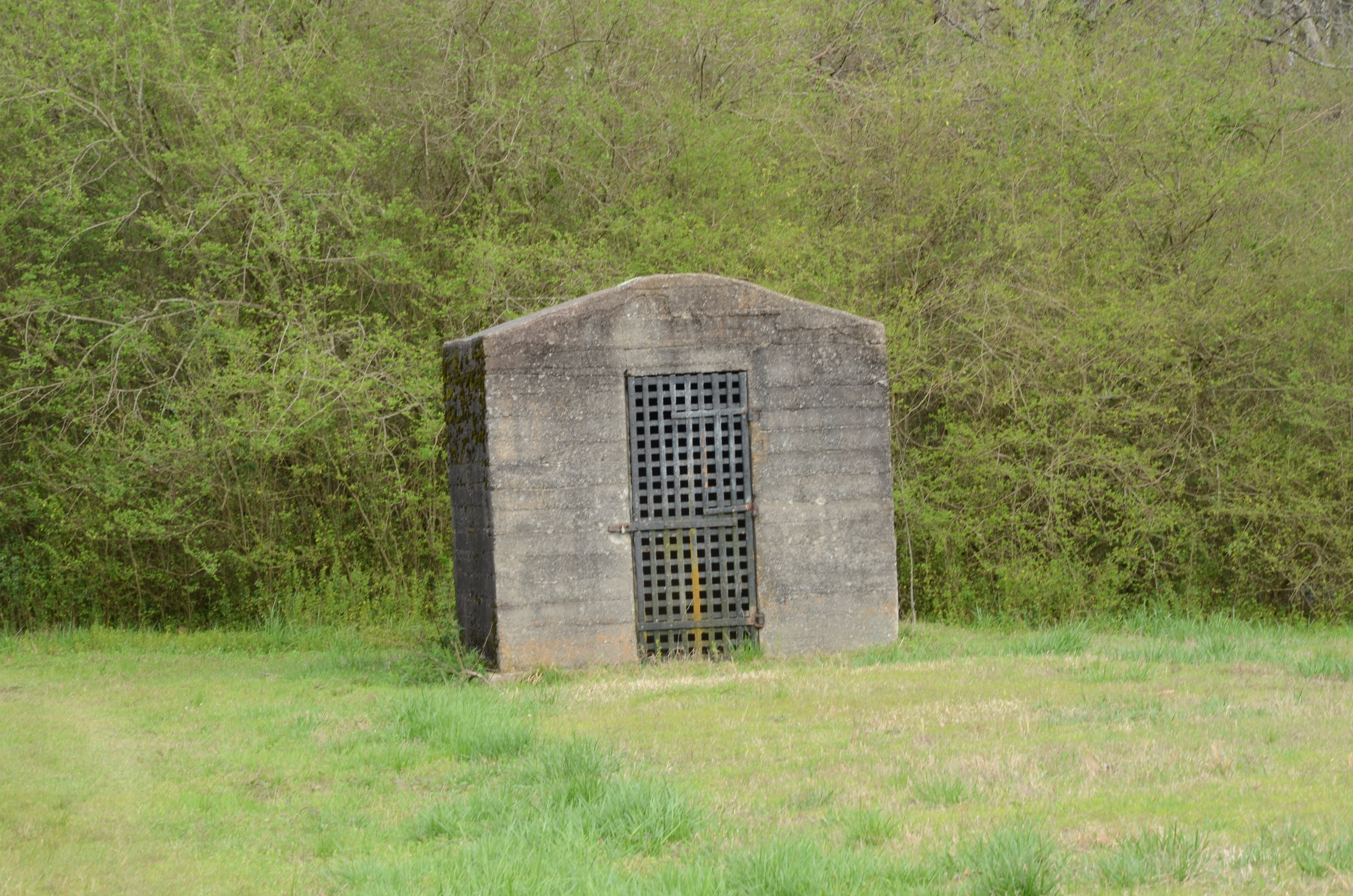

- Location within Arkansas Location within the United States
- Location: Approximately 325 feet (99 m) southeast of Hornberg Ave. & Front St., Gillham, Arkansas
- Coordinates: 34°10′7″N 94°18′51″W
- Area: less than one acre
- Built: 1914
- NRHP reference No.: 11001052
- Added to NRHP: January 27, 2012

The Gillham City Jail is a historic jail building standing in a small park near the junction of Hornberg and Front Streets in Gillham, Arkansas. It is a single-story single-room structure built entire of concrete. It has small barred windows on three elevations, and a barred door on the western elevation. The building was built sometime between 1914 and 1917 as the city was growing rapidly, and is one of the few buildings of that period to survive in the city. It is unknown when the jail ceased to be used; the community suffered economic decline in the Great Depression and after World War II, and probably fell out of use sometime thereafter.

The building was listed on the National Register of Historic Places in 2012.

== See also ==
- National Register of Historic Places listings in Sevier County, Arkansas
