= King Schoolhouse =

- U.S. National Register of Historic Places
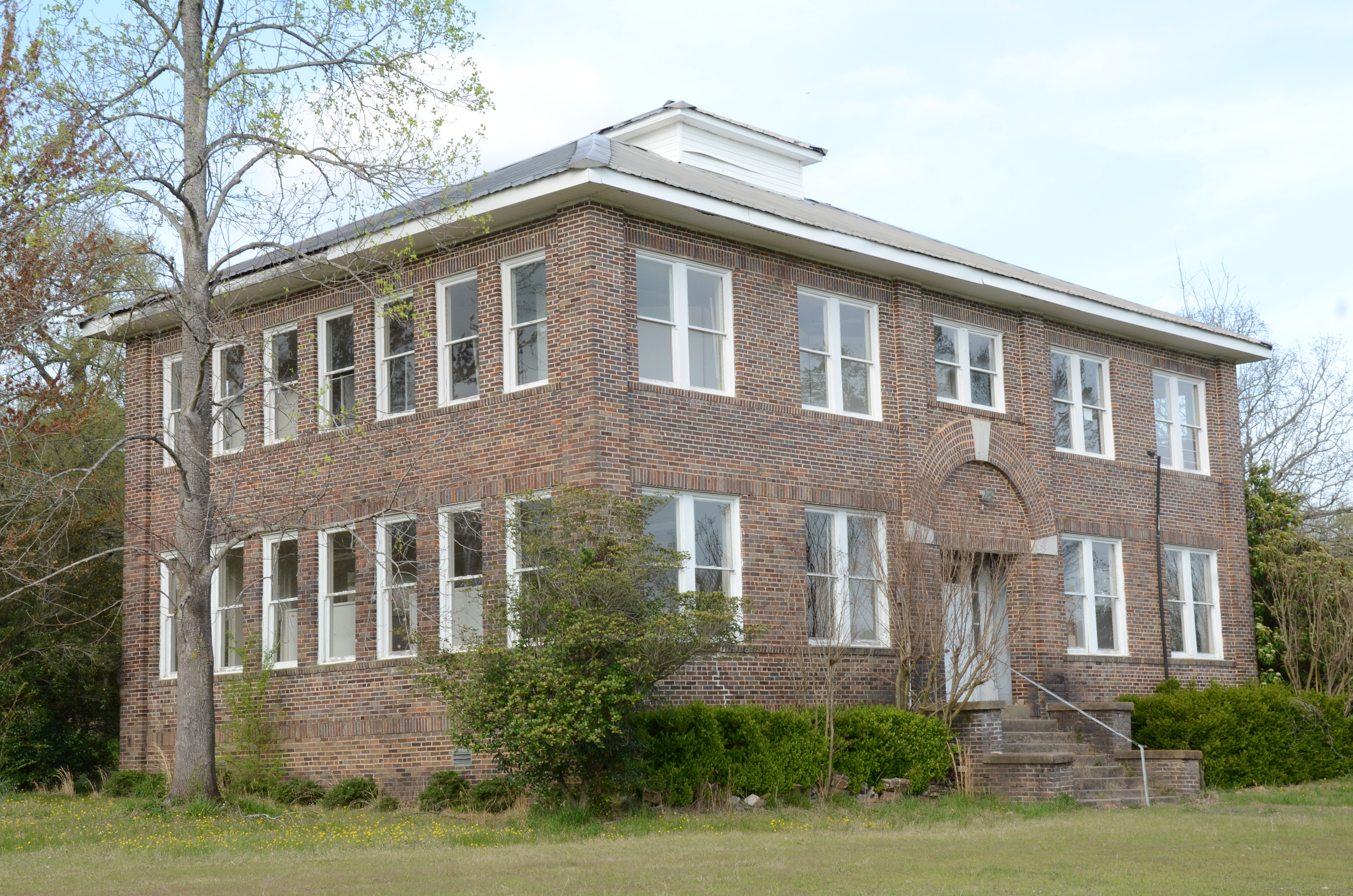

- Location within Arkansas Location within the United States
- Location: Approximately 1 mi. E of AR 71 near center of King, King, Arkansas
- Coordinates: 34°8′51″N 94°17′58″W
- Area: less than one acre
- Built: 1915
- Architectural style: Colonial Revival
- MPS: Railroad Era Resources of Southwest Arkansas MPS
- NRHP reference No.: 96000645
- Added to NRHP: June 20, 1996

The King Schoolhouse is a historic school building in the small town of King, Arkansas. Located near the center of King, about 1 mile (1.6 km) east of United States Route 71, it is a two-story brick building with a hip roof and a hip-roof dormer. Its main entry is centered on the southern facade, slightly recessed under an arch, with sidelight and transom windows. The Colonial Revival building was built in 1915, when King was a bustling lumber and railroad community, and served it as a school, church, and community center, and is the only known Colonial Revival school building in Sevier County. It continues to be used as a community center.

The building was listed on the National Register of Historic Places in 1996.

== See also ==
- National Register of Historic Places listings in Sevier County, Arkansas
