= Two-room school =

Small rural school building

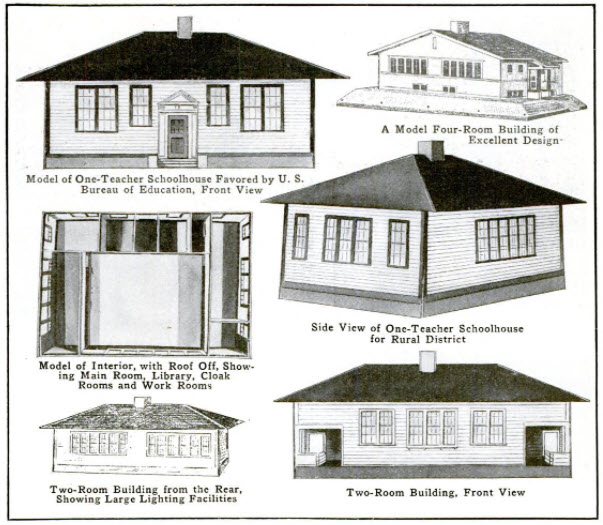
Models of small schools available from the United States Bureau of Education

A two-room schoolhouse is a larger version of the one-room schoolhouse, with many of the same characteristics, providing the facility for primary and secondary education in a small community or rural area. While providing the same function as a contemporary primary school or secondary school building, a small multi-room school house is more similar to a one-room schoolhouse, both being architecturally very simple structures. While once very common in rural areas of many countries, one and two-room schools have largely been replaced although some are still operating. Having a second classroom allowed for two teachers to operate at the school, serving a larger number of schoolchildren and/or more grade levels. Architecturally, they could be slightly more complex, but were still usually very simple. In some areas, a two-room school indicated the village or town was more prosperous.

== Design ==
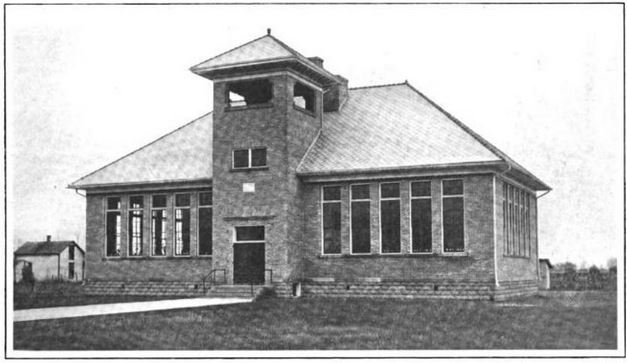
Two-room masonry school built c. 1914 in Osgood, Ohio

A 1909 school planning guide from New Mexico suggests a school room be no bigger than 24 by 30 feet (7.3 m × 9.1 m) which would seat up to 40 students, as "a teacher having charge of more than this number cannot do satisfactory work - especially in a rural school". The width was also the limit of acceptable daylighting from windows on the opposite wall. The guide recommended a vestibule between the entrance and the classrooms to separate the outdoor climate from the classrooms. Coatrooms off the vestibule allowed a place for wet clothes to dry while keeping their "disagreeable offensive odors" out of the classrooms.

North Carolina issued a guide in 1914 with a floorplan of a similar two-room school with the same layout of a front entrance into a vestibule, two coatrooms off the vestibule, and a large room divided by a moveable wall into two 26 ft × 32 ft (7.9 m × 9.8 m) classrooms.

Oklahoma presented a similar design in 1913 for a 23 ft × 30 ft (7.0 m × 9.1 m) one-room school house and a 46 ft × 30 ft (14.0 m × 9.1 m) two-room school, again with a movable wall between the two classrooms. These dimensions do not include the shared vestibule and coat rooms.

A 1916 bulletin issued by the Oregon school superintendent included plans for six different variations of a two-room school house prepared by the Oregon chapter of the American Institute of Architects and the architecture departments of the University of Oregon and Oregon Agricultural College. One plan also featured two similarly sized classrooms, vestibule, coat rooms and the added amenities of an enclosed porch and a 88 sq ft (8.2 m^{2}) library in the front and a wood shed attached to the back with a wood-fired heater for each classroom.

South Carolina noted that school districts in the state that used a standard design from its bulletin, prepared by Clemson Agricultural College, would receive one-half of the construction cost from the state and county. South Carolina recommended one-room schools only if "after careful consideration, and after all efforts to maintain a two-room, two-teacher school have failed.

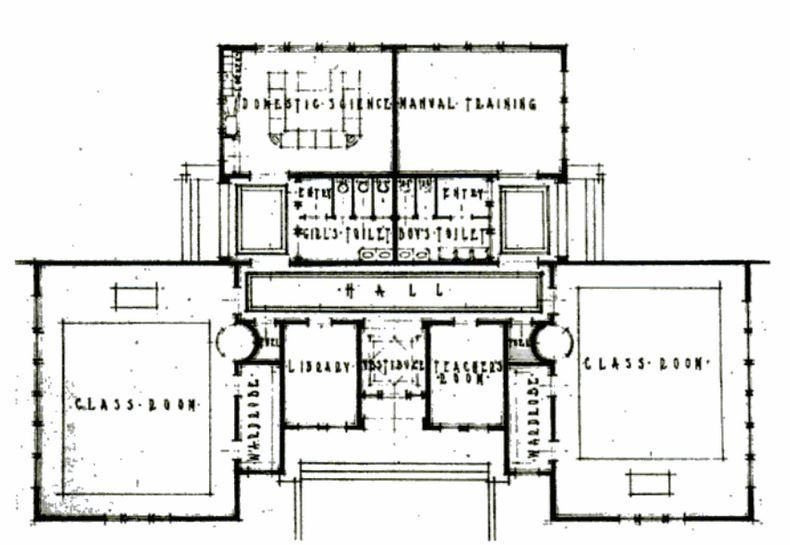
A California plan with opposing classrooms

Instead of adjacent classrooms, a California two-room school plan separates the rooms with long hallway, with the vestibule, coatrooms, a library and teacher's office between the classrooms. A rear projection includes toilets and lab/shop spaces.

A Minnesota design for rural schools gives special attention to minimizing heating duct length to a basement furnace with a compact design with the classroom, library, vestibule, and coatroom clustered together. This one-room school can be expanded to two rooms by mirroring the entire building. The two room school affords for indoor toilets as the "second" library space can be used for a girls' toilet room (a boys' toilet would go under the entrance stairs).

A two-room schoolhouse in Osgood, Ohio, designed by architect C. F. Bowdle of Piqua, Ohio, was cited in the October 1914 issue of Building Age magazine as an example of a "modern" school. To meet state building codes, the entire foundation and exterior walls are made of masonry, with a roof of asbestos shingles. The simple design includes two 31 ft × 38 ft (9.4 m × 11.6 m) classrooms separated by the vestibule and coat rooms. This design included a rear vestibule and exit for each classroom.

== Larger schools ==
To facilitate expansion of schools associated with the growth of a community, plans were also developed to enlarge a school not only from one to two rooms, but also from two to four classrooms, three to six, or four to six or eight. These plans were designed to expand an architecturally simple small school at minimal cost with near complete re-use of the prior building. North Carolina is one state that had such plans.

In the early 20th century, the United States Bureau of Education made scale models of one, two, and four room schoolhouses available to rural communities by parcel post. The models were sufficiently detailed that "any competent carpenter" could replicate the model in full-size. The program was designed to aid small districts that could not afford to pay architects to develop plans for schools with modern standards of "health and efficiency". In 1914, at the program's initiation, it was estimated that there had been 212,000 rural schools built in the United States, most of which had been planned without "any regard to light, ventilation, or sanitation".

== Contemporary use ==
While many small schools were closed after consolidation into larger districts, some remained. A two-room school was operating in the farming community of Ellensburg, Washington, in 1987. The Damman School taught 27 children that year in two classes, those in Kindergarten through second grade in one classroom and those in third through sixth grade in the other. According to the district superintendent, who had attended the school herself, enrollment fell in the late 1960s to as low as four as parents felt their children would be socially disadvantaged by attending a small rural school. Enrollment climbed again in the 1980s as parents sought to avoid problems with peer pressure and drugs in bigger schools. Enrollment climbed to 47 in 2014. After receiving funding in 2019 from a state grant for improving small schools, the school added a third classroom and performed other repairs and modernization of the school.

The two-room Venice School in Tulare County, California, opened in 1892 and served farm families until 1957. It reopened as a private school in 1996 and later became a library for the larger Eleanor Roosevelt Learning Center which supports hundreds of home-schooled students. The image of two-room school is used as the logo for the Learning Center because it is an "important symbol of aspirational leadership in education" and the school provides "a sense of turning back to the successful basics."

One notable two-room teacher is Bonnie Boggs who taught for 14 years in the two-room elementary school in rural Loma, Montana. One room was a classroom, and the other was a science lab and Bogg's innovative use of science in teaching other subjects earned her the National Science Foundation Presidential Award for Excellence in Science and Mathematics in 1995.

== Outside the United States ==
Canada has been home to a number of two-room schools. In Hoggs Hollow, Toronto, the Baron Renfrew School was a two-room school that opened in 1925. It was named in honor of the Edward, then-Prince of Wales, and after King Edward abdicated it was renamed York Mills School. A new wing was added in 1950, and the school continued to operate until 1982. The building was demolished in 2004.

In the Canadian province of Quebec, the Soulanges School in Saint-Télesphore is a two-room schoolhouse constructed with a single room in 1919 and expanded to two rooms in the 1990s. In 2019, it employed two teachers, two aides and a part-time principal to teach 19 students from kindergarten through Grade 4. In September of the same year, it celebrated one hundred years of continuous operation.

In December 2019, the United States Naval Mobile Construction Battalion started a project to demolish and rebuild a two-room schoolhouse at Timor-Leste's National Institute of Health in Dili. The project was finished on March 30, 2020.

== Preservation ==
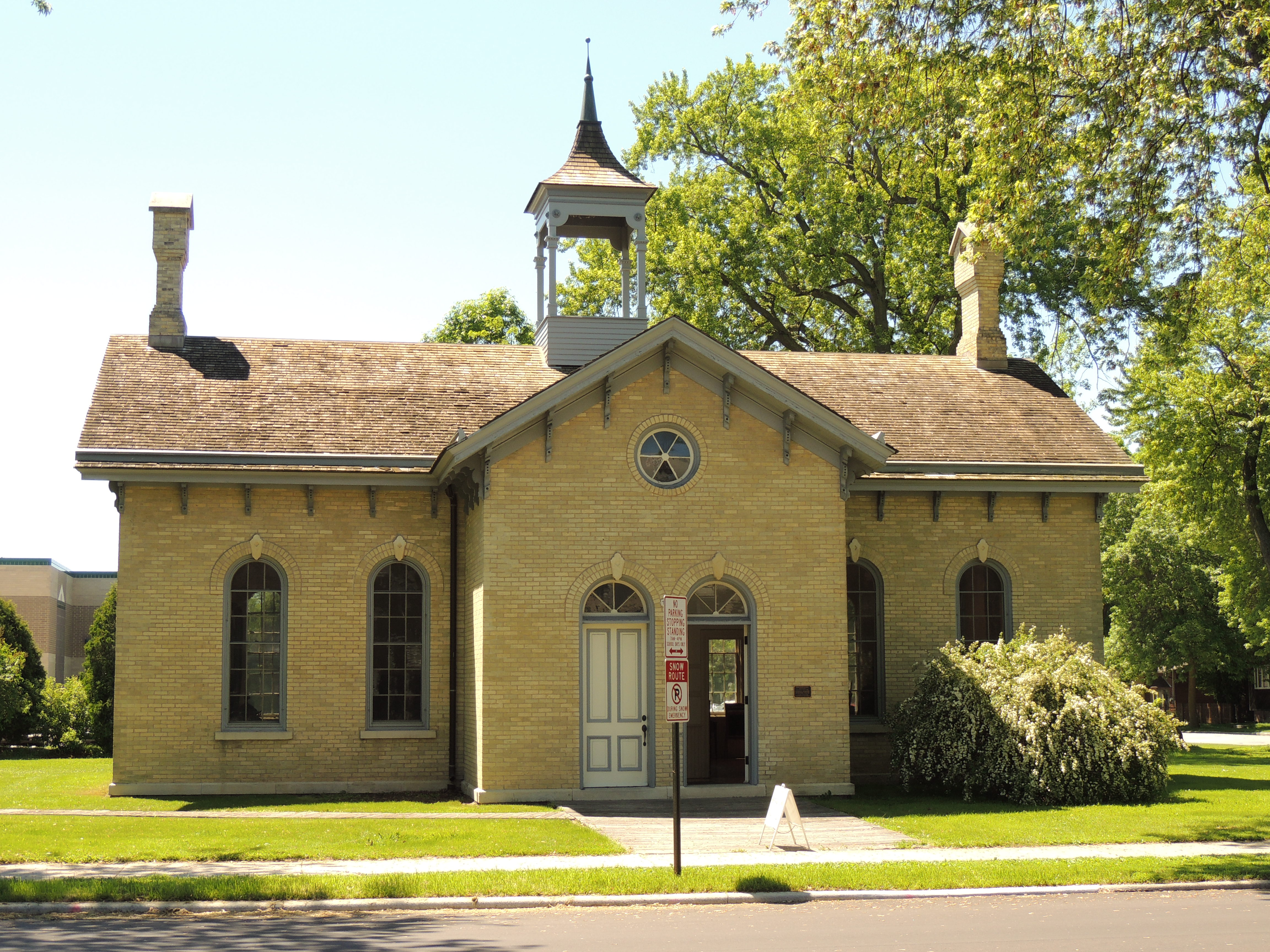
Third Ward School, in Sheboygan, Wisconsin

In the United States, many two-room schoolhouses are preserved and listed on heritage registers and/or serve as museums or converted to dwellings and other uses. These include:

- Butler School, in Oak Brook, Illinois, built c. 1921, used as a school until 1961 and later for civic functions. It was listed on the National Register of Historic Places (NRHP) in 2003.
- Chana School, in Oregon, Illinois, built in 1883 in Chana, Illinois, where it was used as a school until 1953. It was later moved to Oregon and restored for use as a museum of US 1880s education. It was added to the NRHP in 2005.
- Lacombe School, in Lacombe, Louisiana, built in 1913 and used as a school until sometime "well past World War II." It was added to the NRHP in 1990 and serves as a museum.
- Mason District Number 5 Schoolhouse, in Mason Township, Michigan, built in 1874 and used until 1963. It was later used as the town hall and library and listed on the NRHP in 1985.
- New Hope School (Wynne, Arkansas), near Wynne, Arkansas, built in 1903 as a one-room school and expanded to two rooms. It was used as a school until 1951. The school was restored in 2007 by the Cross County Historical Society and added to the NRHP the following year.
- Oak Grove Rosenwald School, in Sevier County, Arkansas, built in 1926 with financial assistance of the Rosenwald Fund. It was added to the NRHP in 2004 as the only surviving Rosenwald School in Arkansas.
- Third Ward School, in Sheboygan, Wisconsin, built in 1867 and used as a school until 1932. After use by the city health department for forty years, it became an education museum and was listed on the NRHP in 1981.
- Central School, in Peoria, Arizona, built in 1906 from masonry to replace the earlier school destroyed by fire. It was sold in 1976, listed on the NRHP in 1982, renovated in 1998 and used as the Peoria Historical Society Museum.
- The Camp Walton Schoolhouse Museum, in downtown Fort Walton Beach, Florida, built in 1911 as a one-room school house and expanded with the addition of a second high-school classroom in 1927. The building has been restored and is used as a museum of history of Camp Walton with an emphasis on education.
- The Mifflin School in Mifflin, Wisconsin, was built in 1920 and used until 1961. It was converted to a private residence in 1965 and is listed on Wisconsin Historical Register.

== Floorplans ==
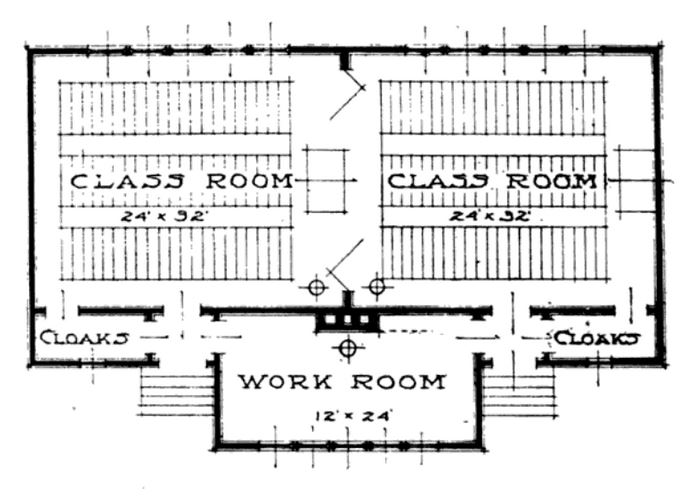
Alabama plan

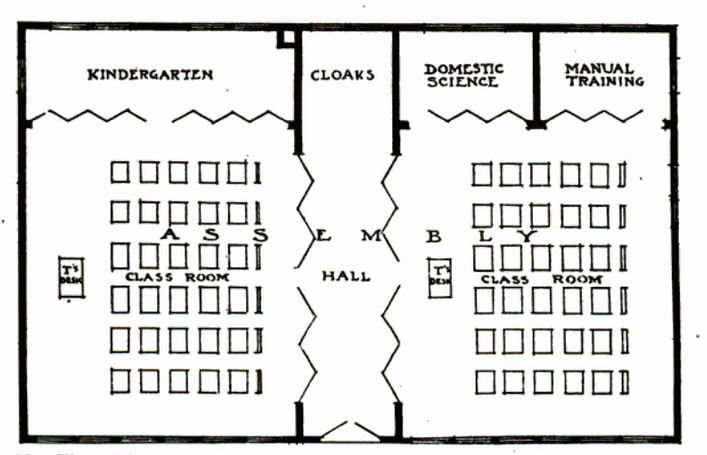
Georgia

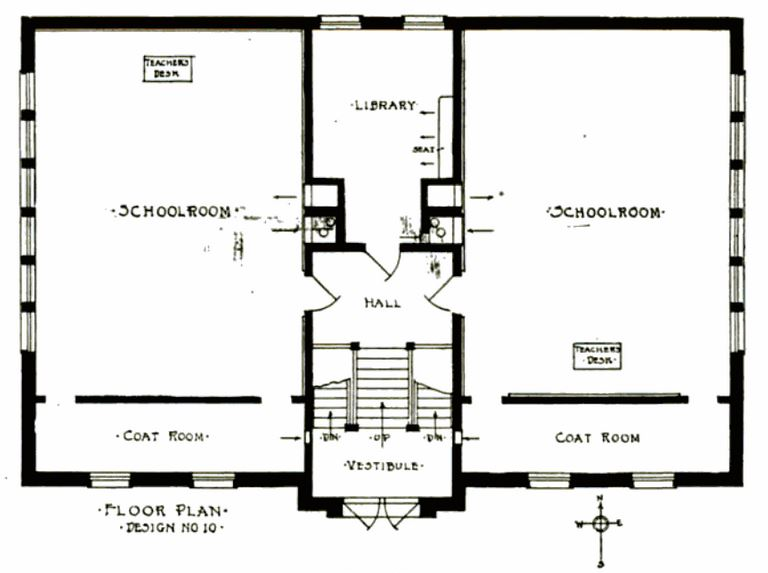
Minnesota

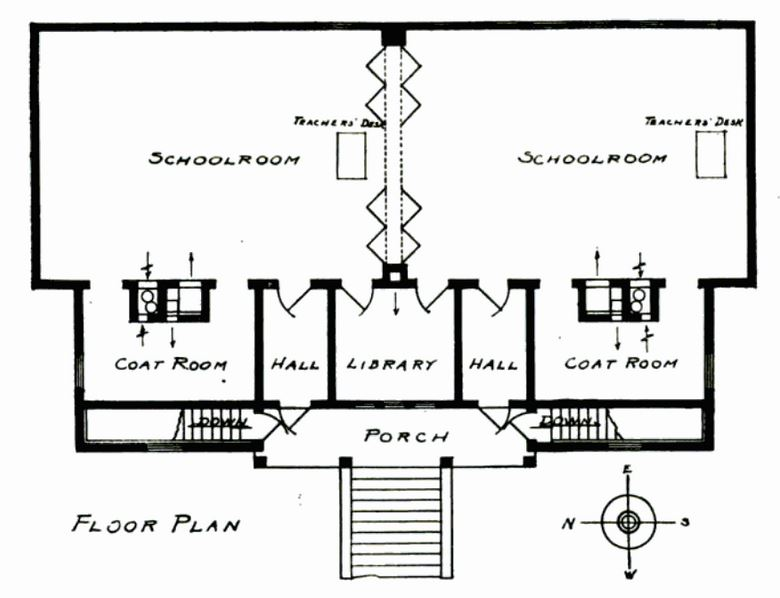
Minnesota
