= Little Cossatot River Bridge =

- U.S. National Register of Historic Places
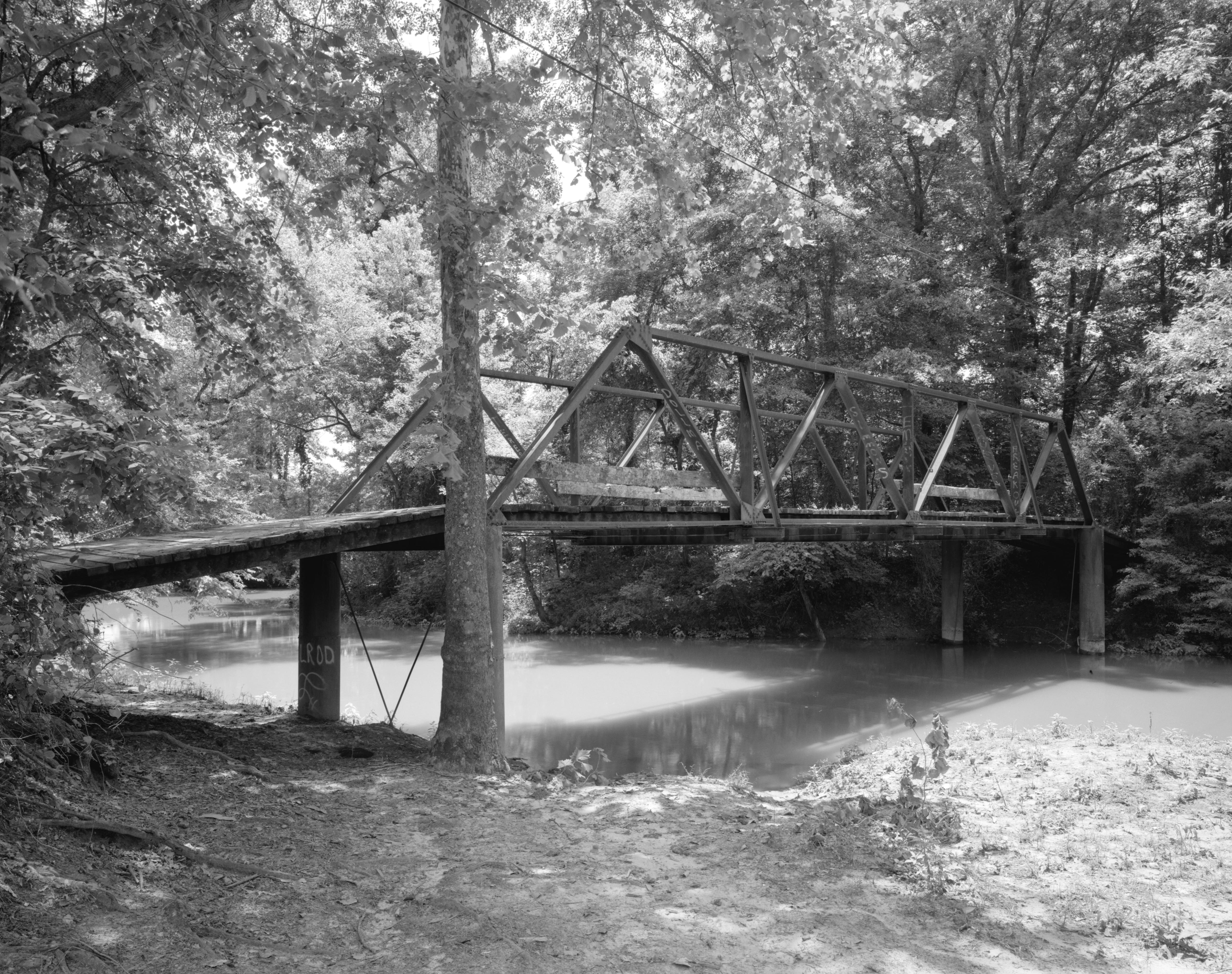

- Location within Arkansas Location within the United States
- Nearest city: Lockesburg, Arkansas
- Coordinates: 33°58′29″N 94°12′18″W
- Area: less than one acre
- Built: 1908
- Built by: Morava Construction Company
- Architectural style: Warren pony-truss
- MPS: Historic Bridges of Arkansas MPS
- NRHP reference No.: 90000538
- Added to NRHP: April 6, 1990

The Little Cossatot River Bridge is a historic bridge in rural Sevier County, Arkansas. It is located just west of Lockesburg, carrying County Road 139H over the Little Cossatot River. The bridge is a Warren pony truss structure, 70 feet (21 m) long, with 17-foot (5.2 m) approaches made of timber stringers. The trusses were built by the Morava Construction Company of Chicago, Illinois, and are believed to be the only of the company's trusses in the state. They feature a top chord that is a solid I-beam, which is connected by riveted plates to the bottom chord. The trusses are set on cylindrical concrete piers on either side of the river.

The bridge was listed on the National Register of Historic Places in 1990.

== See also ==
- List of bridges documented by the Historic American Engineering Record in Arkansas
- List of bridges on the National Register of Historic Places in Arkansas
- National Register of Historic Places listings in Sevier County, Arkansas
