= Goff and Gamble Merchandise Store =

- U.S. National Register of Historic Places
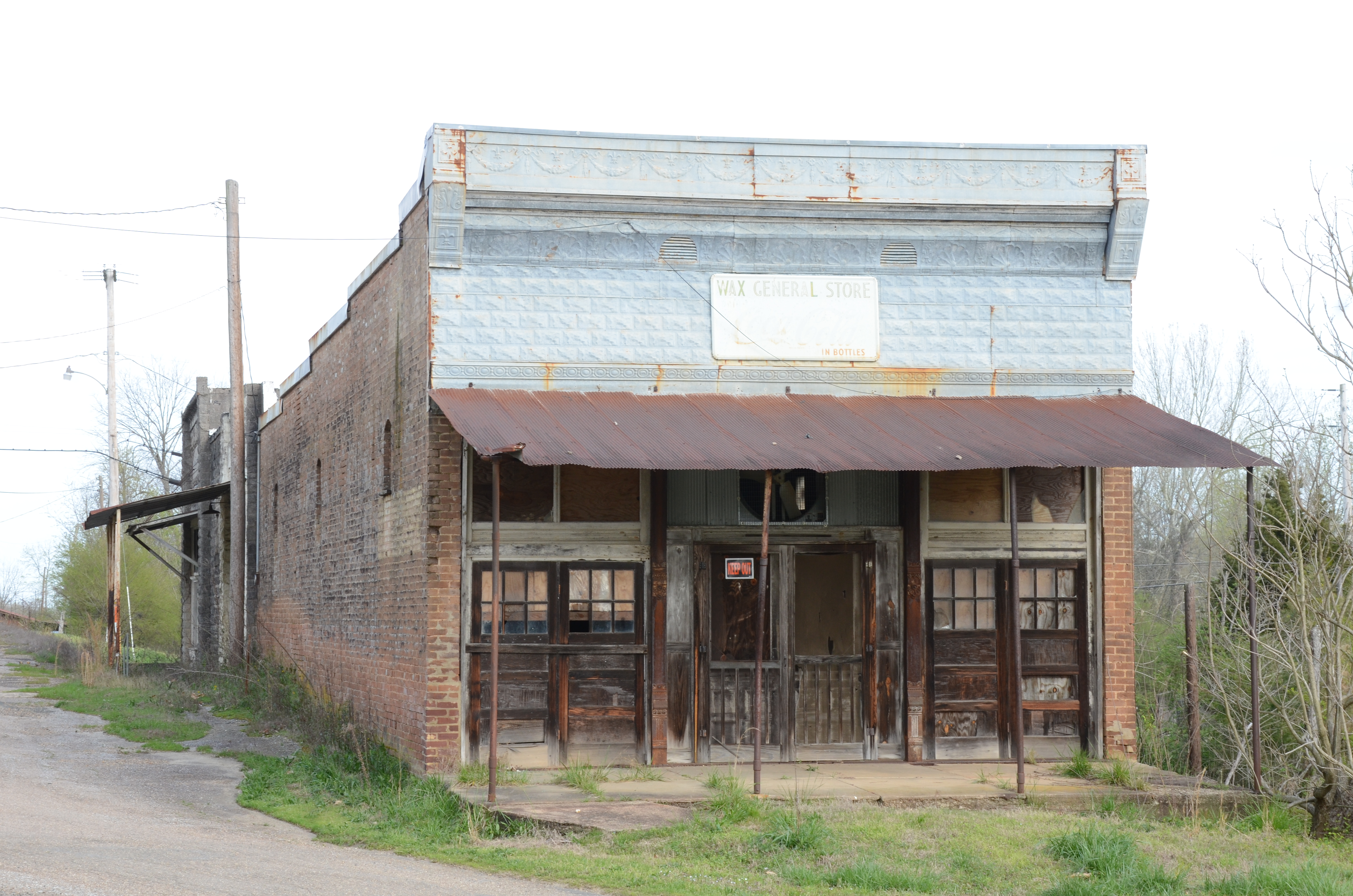

- Location within Arkansas Location within the United States
- Location: 1 block N of the Kansas City--Southern RR tracks in the center of Gillham, Gillham, Arkansas
- Coordinates: 34°10′8″N 94°18′54″W
- Area: less than one acre
- Built: 1900
- Architectural style: Early Commercial
- MPS: Railroad Era Resources of Southwest Arkansas MPS
- NRHP reference No.: 96000646
- Added to NRHP: June 20, 1996

The Goff and Gamble Merchandise Store is a historic retail establishment in the center of Gillham, Arkansas, USA, just north of the railroad tracks. Built in stages between 1900 and 1911, it is one of the few surviving structures in the community dating to its boom years in the early 20th century. The first section of the building, built in 1900, has a wooden storefront topped by a metal cornice, and is the westernmost part of the building. The central section, built out of concrete blocks in 1906, has an entrance facing north, with that elevation topped by a parapet. The eastern section, completed in 1911, is also fashioned from concrete blocks. Its storefront also faces north, flanked by pilasters, and also topped by a simple parapet.

The building was listed on the National Register of Historic Places in 1996, at which time it was still in use as a general store.

== See also ==
- National Register of Historic Places listings in Sevier County, Arkansas
