= Lockesburg, Arkansas =

- City
- Location of Lockesburg in Sevier County, Arkansas.
- Coordinates: 33°58′11″N 94°10′16″W
- Country: United States
- State: Arkansas
- County: Sevier

Area
  - Total: 3.49 sq mi (9.03 km^{2})
  - Land: 3.48 sq mi (9.02 km^{2})
  - Water: 0.0039 sq mi (0.01 km^{2})
- Elevation: 400 ft (120 m)

Population (2020)
  - Total: 594
  - Estimate (2025): 596 ▲
  - Density: 170.5/sq mi (65.84/km^{2})
- Time zone: UTC-6 (Central (CST))
  - Summer (DST): UTC-5 (CDT)
- ZIP code: 71846
- Area code: 870
- FIPS code: 05-41090
- GNIS feature ID: 2404945
- Website: www.cityoflockesburg.org

Lockesburg is a city in Sevier County, Arkansas, United States. As of the 2020 census, Lockesburg had a population of 594.

== History ==
Though Lockesburg became the county seat on January 18, 1869, it was not incorporated until November 7, 1878. The land was donated by three members of a prominent local family—James, William, and Matthew Locke—and one Royal Appleton, for creation of a new county seat after an area of Sevier County was carved away to become part of newly created Little River County, and the existing county seat, Paraclifta, was no longer centrally located. The town’s growth was stunted when a major railroad bypassed the town for De Queen in 1897, along with a subsequent loss of county seat status to De Queen in 1905. But the timber industry served to boost the fortunes of the town in the 20th century.

== Geography ==
Lockesburg is located at 33°58′11″N 94°10′16″W (33.969852, -94.171034).

According to the United States Census Bureau, the town has a total area of 3.5 square miles (9.1 km^{2}), all land.

== Demographics ==
Historical population
Census	Pop.	Note	%±
1880	256		—
1890	451		76.2%
1900	550		22.0%
1910	748		36.0%
1920	794		6.1%
1930	747		−5.9%
1940	764		2.3%
1950	714		−6.5%
1960	511		−28.4%
1970	620		21.3%
1980	616		−0.6%
1990	608		−1.3%
2000	711		16.9%
2010	739		3.9%
2020	594		−19.6%
2025 (est.)	596	▲	0.3%
U.S. Decennial Census

As of the census of 2000, there were 711 people, 276 households, and 197 families residing in the town. The population density was 201.1 inhabitants per square mile (77.6/km^{2}). There were 328 housing units at an average density of 92.8 per square mile (35.8/km^{2}). The racial makeup of the town was 92.55% White, 4.50% Black or African American, 2.25% from other races, and 0.70% from two or more races. 2.95% of the population were Hispanic or Latino of any race.

There were 276 households, out of which 37.3% had children under the age of 18 living with them, 56.2% were married couples living together, 10.9% had a female householder with no husband present, and 28.6% were non-families. 25.4% of all households were made up of individuals, and 13.0% had someone living alone who was 65 years of age or older. The average household size was 2.58 and the average family size was 3.09.

In the town the population had 30.8% under the age of 18, 9.3% from 18 to 24, 26.7% from 25 to 44, 20.4% from 45 to 64, and 12.8% who were 65 years of age or older. The median age was 31 years. For every 100 females, there were 94.8 males. For every 100 females age 18 and over, there were 87.1 males.

The median income for a household in the town was $27,132, and the median income for a family was $31,625. Males had a median income of $25,729 versus $17,813 for females. The per capita income for the town was $12,092. About 11.3% of families and 19.0% of the population were below the poverty line, including 22.4% of those under age 18 and 19.8% of those age 65 or over.

== Transportation ==
Lockesburg is served by US Route 59, US Route 71, US Route 371, and Arkansas State Highway 24.

The town has intercity bus service through Jefferson Lines.

Lockesburg has rail freight service through the DeQueen and Eastern Railroad.

Commercial air service is available out of Texarkana Regional Airport, about 42 miles south-southeast.

== Education ==
It is within the DeQueen School District. On July 1, 2006, the Lockesburg School District consolidated into the DeQueen District.

== Historic places ==
Lockesburg has multiple locations on the National Register, including:

- First United Methodist Church
- Little Cossatot River Bridge
- Lockesburg High School Gymnasium
- Lockesburg Waterworks
