= Oak Grove Rosenwald School =

- U.S. National Register of Historic Places
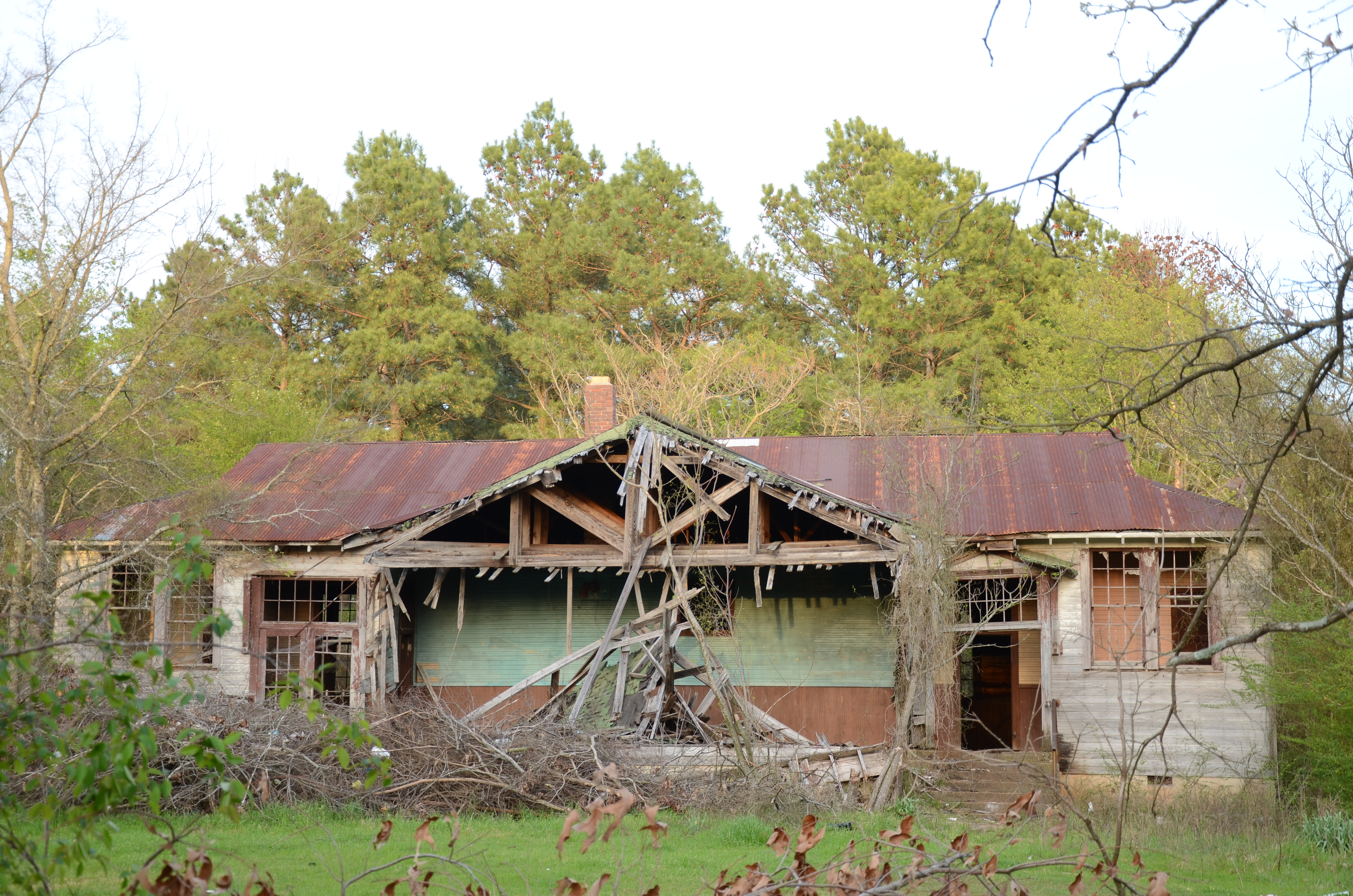

- Location within Arkansas Location within the United States
- Location: Oak Grove Rd., Oak Grove, Sevier County, Arkansas
- Coordinates: 33°53′11″N 94°8′0″W
- Area: 1 acre (0.40 ha)
- Built: 1926
- Architectural style: Plain Traditional
- NRHP reference No.: 04000494
- Added to NRHP: May 26, 2004

The Oak Grove Rosenwald School is a historic school building on Oak Grove Road in Oak Grove, a small settlement in southeastern Sevier County, Arkansas. It is a single-story wood-frame structure, built in 1926 with financial assistance from the Rosenwald Fund. It has two classrooms, and is based on a standard plan developed by Samuel Smith, an agent for the Rosenwald Fund, for this type of small community school. It was probably used for the education of local African Americans until the state's schools were integrated, and is the only surviving Rosenwald school in the county.

The building was listed on the National Register of Historic Places in 2004.

The Rosenwald Fund provided for 38 schools in Arkansas in 1926–27, including this and 19 others of two-room schoolhouse design.

== See also ==
- National Register of Historic Places listings in Sevier County, Arkansas
