= Otis Theodore and Effiegene Locke Wingo House =

Historic house in Arkansas, United States

- U.S. National Register of Historic Places
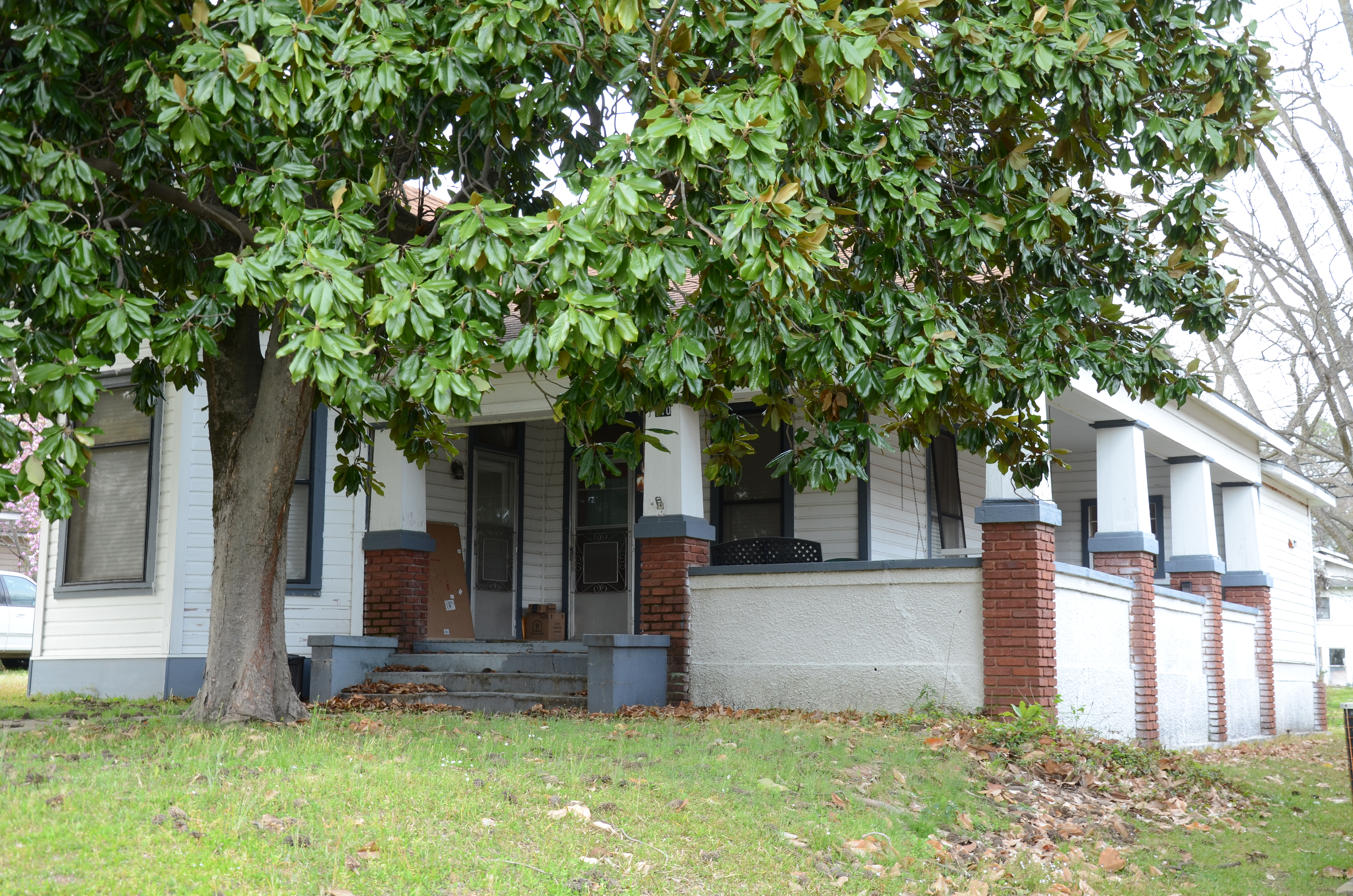

- Location within Arkansas Location within the United States
- Location: 510 W. De Queen Ave., De Queen, Arkansas
- Coordinates: 34°2′22″N 94°20′39″W
- Area: less than one acre
- Architect: Bill Gatlin
- Architectural style: Queen Anne
- NRHP reference No.: 04000501
- Added to NRHP: June 1, 2004

The Otis Theodore and Effiegene Locke Wingo House is a historic house at 510 West De Queen Avenue in De Queen, Arkansas. It is a 1 1/2-story wood-frame structure, built in 1904 but altered significantly later. Originally Queen Anne in style, the house has irregular massing and a complex cross-gabled roof line. Its original Queen Anne porch was replaced c. 1920 by an American Craftsman style porch with heavy wooden columns set on concrete and brick piers. A later shed-roof porch wraps around the southern side of the building, and at the rear of the house a 1/2 story was added at a later date. The house is notable as the home of United States Congressman Otis Theodore Wingo, and his wife Effiegene Locke Wingo, who served out his final term after his death and then was elected to Congress in her own right.

The house was listed on the National Register of Historic Places in 2004.

== See also ==
- National Register of Historic Places listings in Sevier County, Arkansas
