= Paraclifta, Arkansas =

- Ghost town
- Interactive map of Paraclifta, Arkansas
- Country: United States
- State: Arkansas
- County: Sevier
- Established: 1828

Population (1850)
  - Total: 15 families

Paraclifta, Arkansas was a community in Sevier County, Arkansas during the 19th century. Located on the Cossatot River, the community was the first county seat of Sevier County, but lost its status as such to Lockesburg in 1869 after the transfer of land from Sevier County to other counties meant that Paraclifta was no longer centrally located. Most of the community's residents moved to Lockesburg in the early 1870s, shortly after the county courthouse was established there and the county records were moved.

== History ==
Sevier County, Arkansas Territory was formed in 1828. That year, a four-person committee selected a location for the county seat. The location selected became the community of Paraclifta. The name Paraclifta is said to be taken from the name of a Choctaw chief who supposedly rescued a group of settlers accused of horse theft. Paraclifta was located on the east bank of the Cossatot River. The first courthouse at Paraclifta was built from logs in 1829 at a cost of $150 and court was first held in Paraclifta that same year. In 1830, a post office was opened in Paraclifta. The Arkansas Territory became the state of Arkansas in 1836.

The Cossatot River flows into the Little River and thence into the Red River; these river connections allowed cotton grown in the Paraclifta area to be shipped to New Orleans, Louisiana. Additionally, Paraclifta was connected by road to points such as Fort Smith, Arkansas, and Fort Gibson in the Indian Territory. The old log courthouse was replaced with a lumber one in 1841. By 1850, Paraclifta was inhabited by 15 families; during the 1850s the community had four newspapers. A finishing school known as the Paraclifta Seminary operated in the community. Adjustments to the boundaries of Sevier County led to the decline of Paraclifta. At various points from the 1840s to the 1870s, territory was removed from Sevier County as part of the formation of Polk County, Little River County, and Howard County. By 1867, Paraclifta was no longer centrally located within Sevier County, leading to discussions about relocating the county seat, which was moved to Lockesburg in 1869. A new courthouse was built at Lockesburg in either 1871 or 1872, and the county's records were moved to Lockesburg the year after the completion of the courthouse. Almost all of the residents of Paraclifta moved to Lockesburg; the remaining buildings were purchased by future Attorney General of Arkansas Hal Norwood, whose family also moved to Lockesburg in 1885. By 1985, all that remained of Paraclifta was the Gilliam–Norwood House, several cemeteries, a historical marker, and a monument built in 1949.

== Sources ==
- Hudson, James J., ed. (1958). "From Paraclifta to Marks' Mill: The Civil War Correspondence of Lieutenant Robert C. Gilliam". Arkansas Historical Quarterly. 17 (3): 272–302.
