= Lacombe School =

- U.S. National Register of Historic Places
- Location within Louisiana Location within the United States
- Location: Jct. of St. Mary and 14th Sts., Lacombe, Louisiana
- Coordinates: 30°18′56″N 89°56′37″W
- Area: less than one acre
- Built: 1913
- NRHP reference No.: 90001742
- Added to NRHP: November 8, 1990

Lacombe School, built in 1913 in Lacombe, Louisiana as a one-story two-room schoolhouse, was listed on the U.S. National Register of Historic Places in 1990. It was then the Lacombe Museum. It is now known as the Bayou Lacombe Museum.

It is a "plain" building with a tin hipped roof. It served as the community's only elementary school from 1913 until "well past World War II". Through 1990 the beaded board interior had retained its historic appearance, although some wall surfaces were obscured by museum exhibit boards.

It is located on property of the current Lacombe Junior High School, and is linked to that by a covered walkway.

The schoolhouse/museum is accessible by a handicapped-access ramp.

There exists a different "Lacombe Museum" in Lacombe, Alberta, Canada.
