= Bishop Brookes House =

Historic house in Arkansas, United States

- U.S. National Register of Historic Places
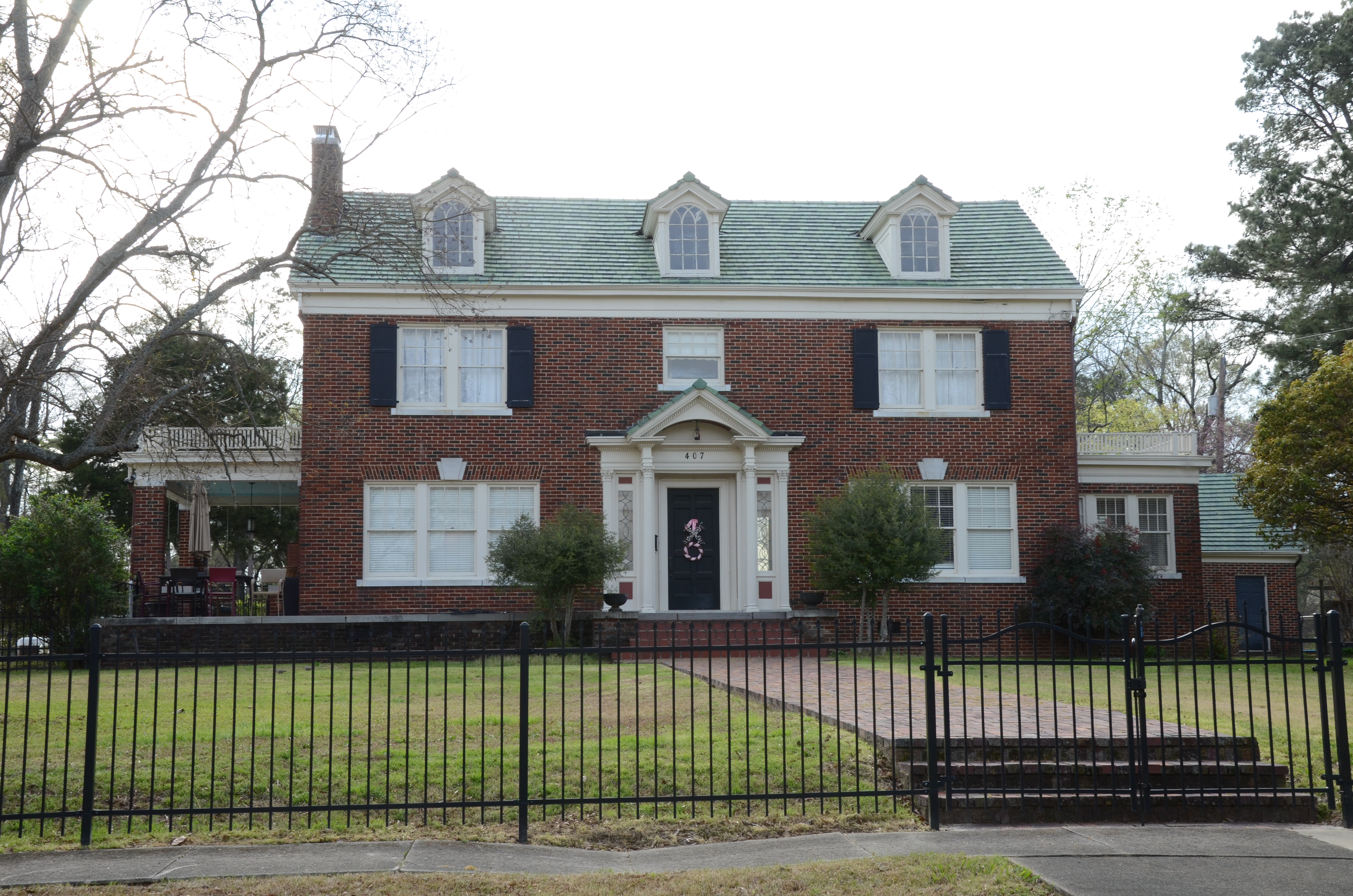

- Location within Arkansas Location within the United States
- Location: 407 N. 6th St., DeQueen, Arkansas
- Coordinates: 34°2′23″N 94°20′39″W
- Area: less than one acre
- Built: 1922
- Built by: B.W. Gatlin
- Architectural style: Colonial Revival
- NRHP reference No.: 99001352
- Added to NRHP: November 18, 1999

The Bishop Brookes House is a historic house at 407 North 6th Street in De Queen, Arkansas. It is a 2 1/2-story brick structure, built between 1922 and 1928 by Bishop Brookes, Sr., the proprietor of the locally prominent Brookes Drug Store. The house is an excellent local example of Colonial Revival architecture, with a symmetrical facade, and a center entry with portico supported by Corinthian columns. The house remained in the Brookes family until 1995.

The house was listed on the National Register of Historic Places in 1999.

== See also ==
- National Register of Historic Places listings in Sevier County, Arkansas
