= First Presbyterian Church (De Queen, Arkansas) =

Historic church in Arkansas, United States

- U.S. National Register of Historic Places
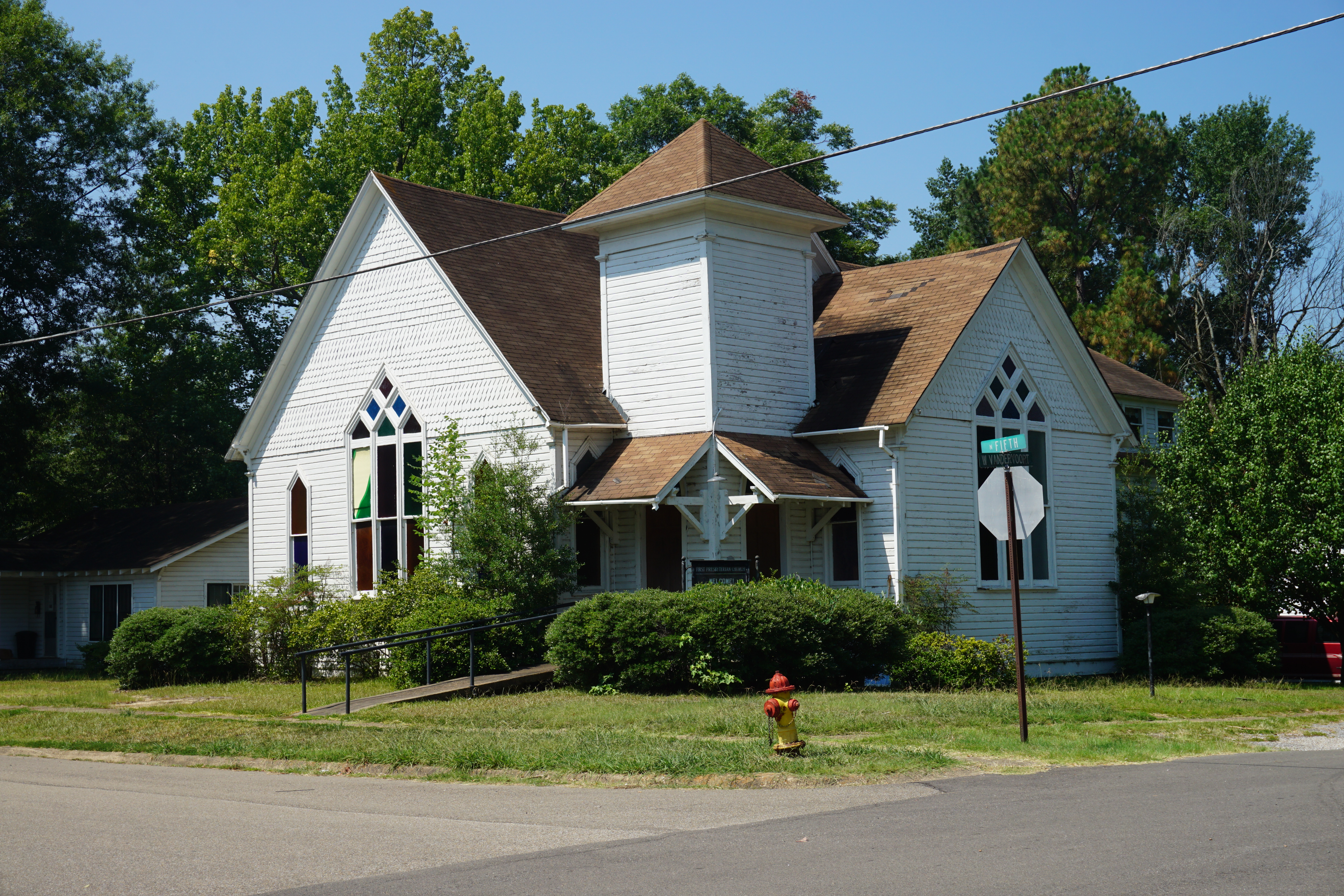

- Location within Arkansas Location within the United States
- Location: Jct. of Vandervoort and N. Fifth Sts., SW corner, DeQueen, Arkansas
- Coordinates: 34°2′24″N 94°20′34″W
- Area: less than one acre
- Built: 1898
- Architect: Simon E. Dollardhide
- Architectural style: Late Gothic Revival, Bungalow/craftsman
- NRHP reference No.: 94001419
- Added to NRHP: December 1, 1994

The First Presbyterian Church is a historic church at the junction of Vandervoort and N. Fifth Sts., SW corner in De Queen, Arkansas. It is a single-story wood-frame structure, built in 1898 for a newly established congregation. The church is the city's finest example of Gothic Revival architecture, with Gothic-arched entrances on the north and east faces of the tower, and a large three-part Gothic window on the eastern gable end, topped with triangular arches. The main gable ends of the roof are decorated with brackets, as are the ends of a cross gable on the southern elevation.

The church was listed on the National Register of Historic Places in 1994.

== See also ==
- National Register of Historic Places listings in Sevier County, Arkansas
