= First United Methodist Church (Lockesburg, Arkansas) =

Historic church in Arkansas, United States

- U.S. National Register of Historic Places
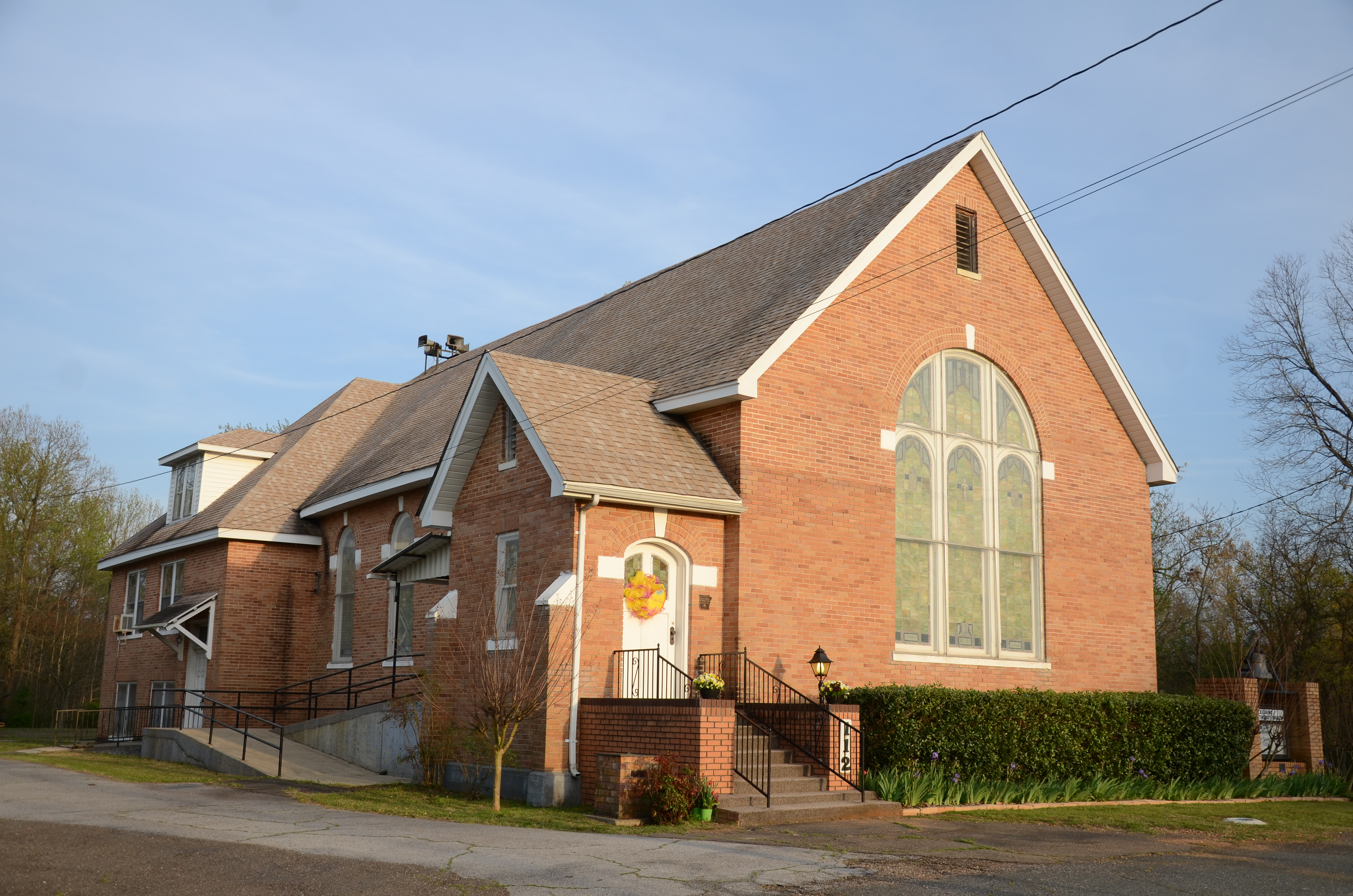

- Location within Arkansas Location within the United States
- Location: E of jct. of 2nd St. and 5th Ave., Lockesburg, Arkansas
- Coordinates: 33°58′5″N 94°9′55″W
- Area: less than one acre
- Built: 1926
- Architectural style: Late Gothic Revival, Late 19th And Early 20th Century American Movements
- NRHP reference No.: 94000468
- Added to NRHP: May 19, 1994

The First United Methodist Church is a historic church east of the junction of 2nd Street and 5th Avenue in Lockesburg, Arkansas. It is a T-shaped structure, with a single-story nave and an asymmetrical 2 1/2-story cross section at the rear of the building. It is framed in wood and clad in brick. Built in 1926, it is the fourth church building to serve a congregation formally established in 1872, and is a particularly well-preserved example of a Gothic Revival structure with Classical and Medieval Revival elements. This distinctive combination of elements is rare in Arkansas church architecture.

The church was listed on the National Register of Historic Places in 1994.

== See also ==
- National Register of Historic Places listings in Sevier County, Arkansas
