= Lockesburg High School Gymnasium =

- U.S. National Register of Historic Places
- Location within Arkansas Location within the United States
- Location: 128 East Main St., Lockesburg, Arkansas
- Coordinates: 33°58′2″N 94°10′4″W
- Built: 1952
- NRHP reference No.: 100002458
- Added to NRHP: May 18, 2018

The Lockesburg High School Gymnasium is a historic school gymnasium at 128 East Main Street in Lockesburg, Arkansas. Built in 1952–53, it is a utilitarian rectangular building, built out of concrete blocks and resting on a poured concrete foundation. Its main facade is the north side, with a center entrance shaded by an awning, and symmetrically placed porthole windows on either side. Most of the building's interior is taken up by the actual playing area, with tiered bleachers on two sides. The interior finishes are largely original materials. It was built to meet growing post-World War II demand for improved school facilities, and has historically served as a venue for most of the community's larger-scale social events. The school closed in 1968; the building is now owned by Cossatot Community College.

The building was listed on the National Register of Historic Places in 2018.

== See also ==
- National Register of Historic Places listings in Sevier County, Arkansas
