= Lockesburg Waterworks =

- U.S. National Register of Historic Places
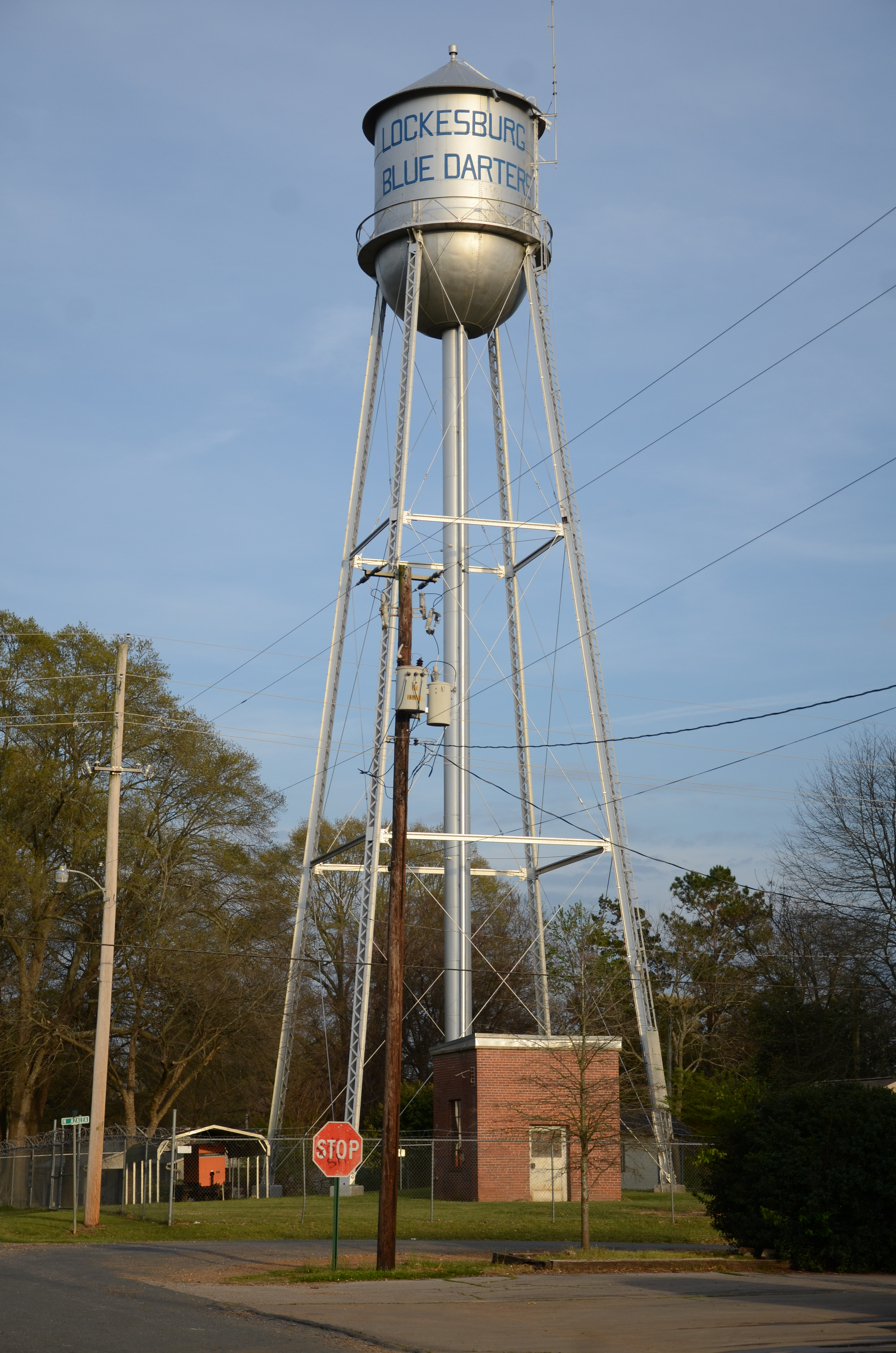

- Location within Arkansas Location within the United States
- Location: Jct. of Hickory and Azalea Sts., Lockesburg, Arkansas
- Coordinates: 33°58′7″N 94°10′1″W
- Built: 1936
- Architectural style: Plain/Traditional
- MPS: New Deal Recovery Efforts in Arkansas MPS
- NRHP reference No.: 07000964
- Added to NRHP: September 20, 2007

Lockesburg Waterworks are a water storage and distribution facility at the junction of Hickory and Azalea Streets in Lockesburg, Arkansas. The facility consists of a water tower and three water storage sheds, of which the tower was built in 1936 with funding assistance from the Public Works Administration, a Depression-era works project. The older shed was built in 1945, and the second was built in 1990. The tower is a metal structure with four legs supported and stabilized by cross bracing, with a metal tank at the top which is sheltered by a conical roof. The oldest shed is a modest square brick structure at the center of the complex, while the 1990 shed is located at the southwest corner of the property.

The property was listed on the National Register of Historic Places in 2007.

== See also ==
- National Register of Historic Places listings in Sevier County, Arkansas
