= DeQueen & Eastern Railroad Machine Shop =

- U.S. National Register of Historic Places
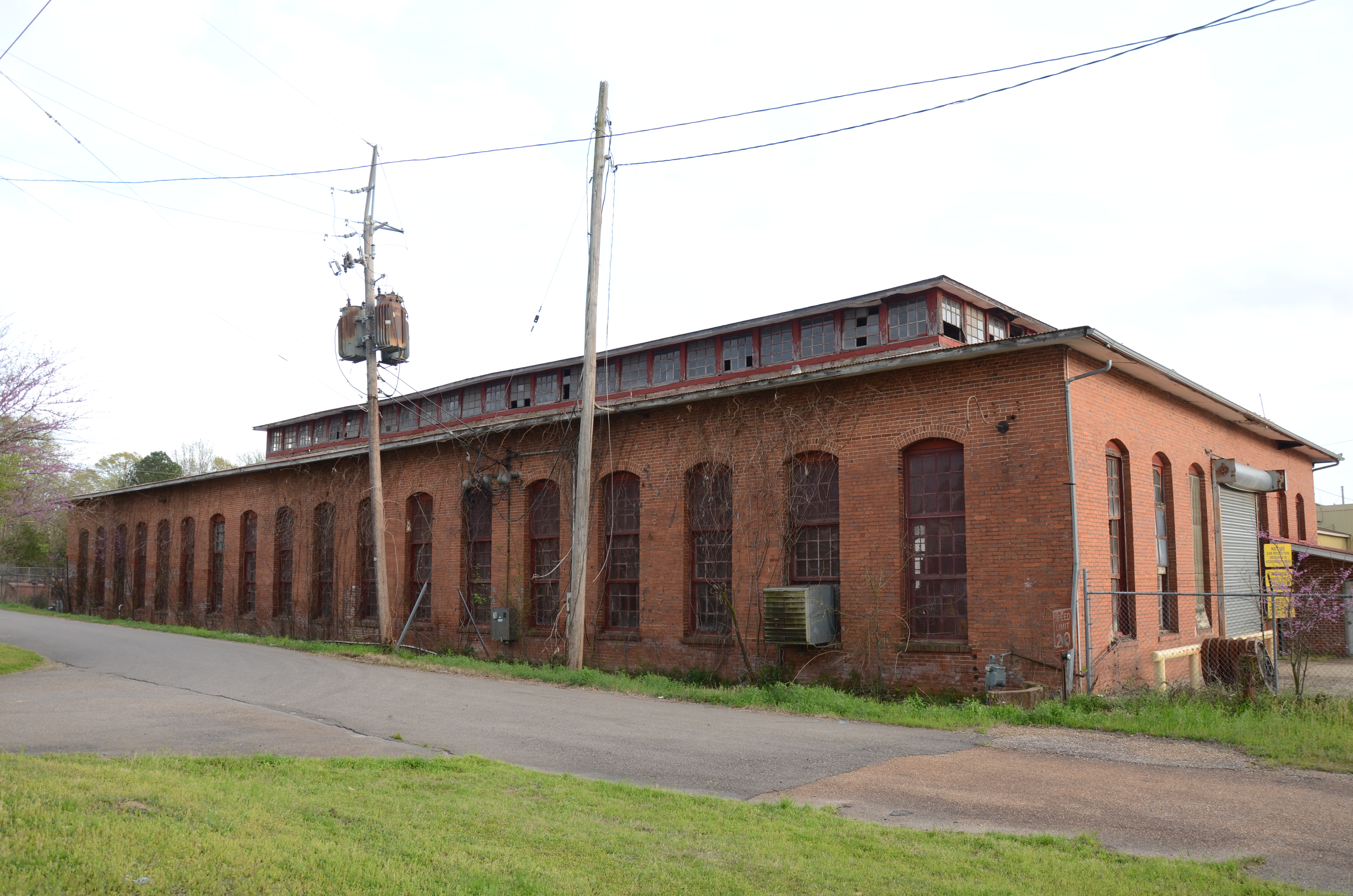

- Location within Arkansas Location within the United States
- Location: Northwestern edge of DeQueen and Eastern RR yard, adjacent to AR 329, De Queen, Arkansas
- Coordinates: 34°2′8″N 94°19′59″W
- Area: less than one acre
- Built: 1905
- Architectural style: Italianate
- MPS: Railroad Era Resources of Southwest Arkansas MPS
- NRHP reference No.: 96000643
- Added to NRHP: June 20, 1996

The DeQueen & Eastern Railroad Machine Shop is an historic railroad maintenance shop in De Queen, Arkansas. The former machine shop is located on the northwest corner of the railyard of the De Queen and Eastern Railroad, near the corner of South Hughes Street and East Lockesburg Avenue. It is a tall and long single-story brick structure, with a monitor roof and modest Italianate styling. Built c. 1905, it is one of the oldest surviving buildings built by this particular railroad company, and is the only known period railroad shop building in the region.

The building was listed on the National Register of Historic Places in 1996.

== See also ==
- National Register of Historic Places listings in Sevier County, Arkansas
