= De Queen Commercial Historic District =

Historic district in Arkansas, United States

- DeQueen Commercial Historic District
- U.S. National Register of Historic Places
- U.S. Historic district
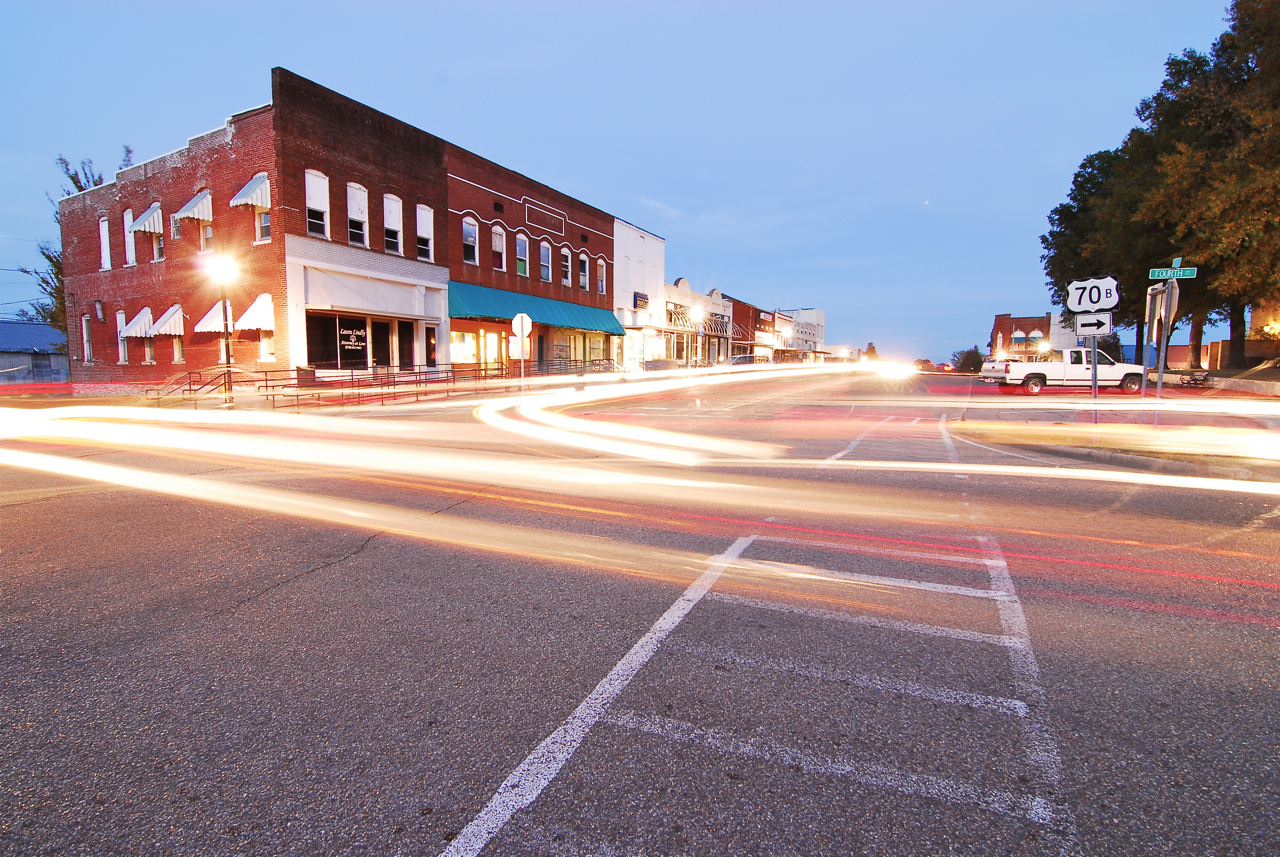
- View of West DeQueen Ave. at the junction with 4th St.

- Location within Arkansas Location within the United States
- Location: Roughly bounded by W. DeQueen Ave., N. 2nd St., W. Stilwell Ave. & N. 4th Ave., De Queen, Arkansas
- Area: 9 acres (3.6 ha)
- NRHP reference No.: 11001051
- Added to NRHP: January 26, 2012

The DeQueen Commercial Historic District encompasses part of the commercial heart of downtown De Queen, Arkansas. The district is centered on the block containing the Sevier County Courthouse, a three-story brick Colonial Revival structure built in 1930. It includes buildings facing the courthouse square on West DeQueen Avenue, West Stilwell Avenue, and North Third Street, and extends an additional block eastward to North Second Street. This commercial heart of the city was developed mainly between 1900 and 1920, and includes 21 historically significant buildings. Notable among them is the former Hayes Hardware Building at 314 West DeQueen, built c. 1900, and the Bank of DeQueen at 221 West DeQueen, also built c. 1900.

The district was listed on the National Register of Historic Places in 2012.

== See also ==
- National Register of Historic Places listings in Sevier County, Arkansas
