= DeQueen School District =

School district in Arkansas, United States

Address
- 101 North Ninth Street De Queen, Arkansas, 71832; United States

District information
- Type: Public
- Grades: K–12
- NCES District ID: 0500049

Students and staff
- Students: 2,295
- Teachers: 186.77
- Staff: 182.77
- Student–teacher ratio: 12.29

Other information
- Website: www.dequeenleopards.org

Dequeen School District 17 is a school district in Sevier County, Arkansas, headquartered in De Queen.

== History ==
The Gillham School District consolidated into the DeQueen district on July 1, 1986. On July 1, 2006, the Lockesburg School District consolidated into the DeQueen District.

In 1969 the Sevier County school district merged into the Lockesburg district.

== Schools ==
- De Queen Primary School
- De Queen Elementary School
- De Queen Middle School
- De Queen Jr. High School
- De Queen High School
