= Gillham, Arkansas =

- Town
- Location of Gillham in Sevier County, Arkansas.
- Coordinates: 34°10′12″N 94°18′56″W
- Country: United States
- State: Arkansas
- County: Sevier

Area
  - Total: 0.93 sq mi (2.42 km^{2})
  - Land: 0.92 sq mi (2.38 km^{2})
  - Water: 0.015 sq mi (0.04 km^{2})
- Elevation: 742 ft (226 m)

Population (2020)
  - Total: 157
  - Estimate (2025): 155 ▼
  - Density: 171.0/sq mi (66.01/km^{2})
- Time zone: UTC-6 (Central (CST))
  - Summer (DST): UTC-5 (CDT)
- ZIP code: 71841
- Area code: 870
- FIPS code: 05-27010
- GNIS feature ID: 2406570

Gillham is a town in Sevier County, Arkansas, United States. As of the 2020 census, Gillham had a population of 157. It is located six miles from Gillham Lake.

== Geography ==
Gillham is located at 34°10′12″N 94°18′56″W (34.170083, -94.315529).

According to the United States Census Bureau, the town has a total area of 2.3 km^{2} (0.89 sq mi), of which 2.2 km^{2} (0.85 sq mi) is land and 1.15% is water.

== Demographics ==
Historical population
Census	Pop.	Note	%±
1910	291		—
1920	317		8.9%
1930	242		−23.7%
1940	238		−1.7%
1950	207		−13.0%
1960	177		−14.5%
1970	200		13.0%
1980	252		26.0%
1990	210		−16.7%
2000	188		−10.5%
2010	160		−14.9%
2020	157		−1.9%
2025 (est.)	155	▼	−1.3%
U.S. Decennial Census; 2014 Estimate

As of the census of 2000, there were 188 people, 74 households, and 54 families residing in the town. The population density was 84.4 people /km^{2} (219 people/mi^{2}). There were 86 housing units at an average density of 38.6 units /km^{2} (100 units/mi^{2}). The racial makeup of the town was 89.36% White, 0.53% Native American, 1.06% Asian, 7.45% from other races, and 1.60% from two or more races. 10.64% of the population were Hispanic or Latino of any race.

There were 74 households, out of which 36.5% had children under the age of 18 living with them, 51.4% were married couples living together, 10.8% had a female householder with no husband present, and 27.0% were non-families. 20.3% of all households were made up of individuals, and 4.1% had someone living alone who was 65 years of age or older. The average household size was 2.54 and the average family size was 2.87.

In the town, the population was spread out, with 26.1% under the age of 18, 10.6% from 18 to 24, 30.3% from 25 to 44, 25.0% from 45 to 64, and 8.0% who were 65 years of age or older. The median age was 35 years. For every 100 females, there were 116.1 males. For every 100 females age 18 and over, there were 113.8 males.

The median income for a household in the town was $24,375, and the median income for a family was $24,375. Males had a median income of $25,469 versus $15,208 for females. The per capita income for the town was $10,758. About 16.0% of families and 23.8% of the population were below the poverty line, including 34.9% of those under the age of 18 and 17.4% of those 65 or over.

== Education ==
The DeQueen School District operates area public schools. The Gillham School District consolidated into the DeQueen district on July 1, 1986.
