= De Queen, Arkansas =

City in Arkansas, United States

- City
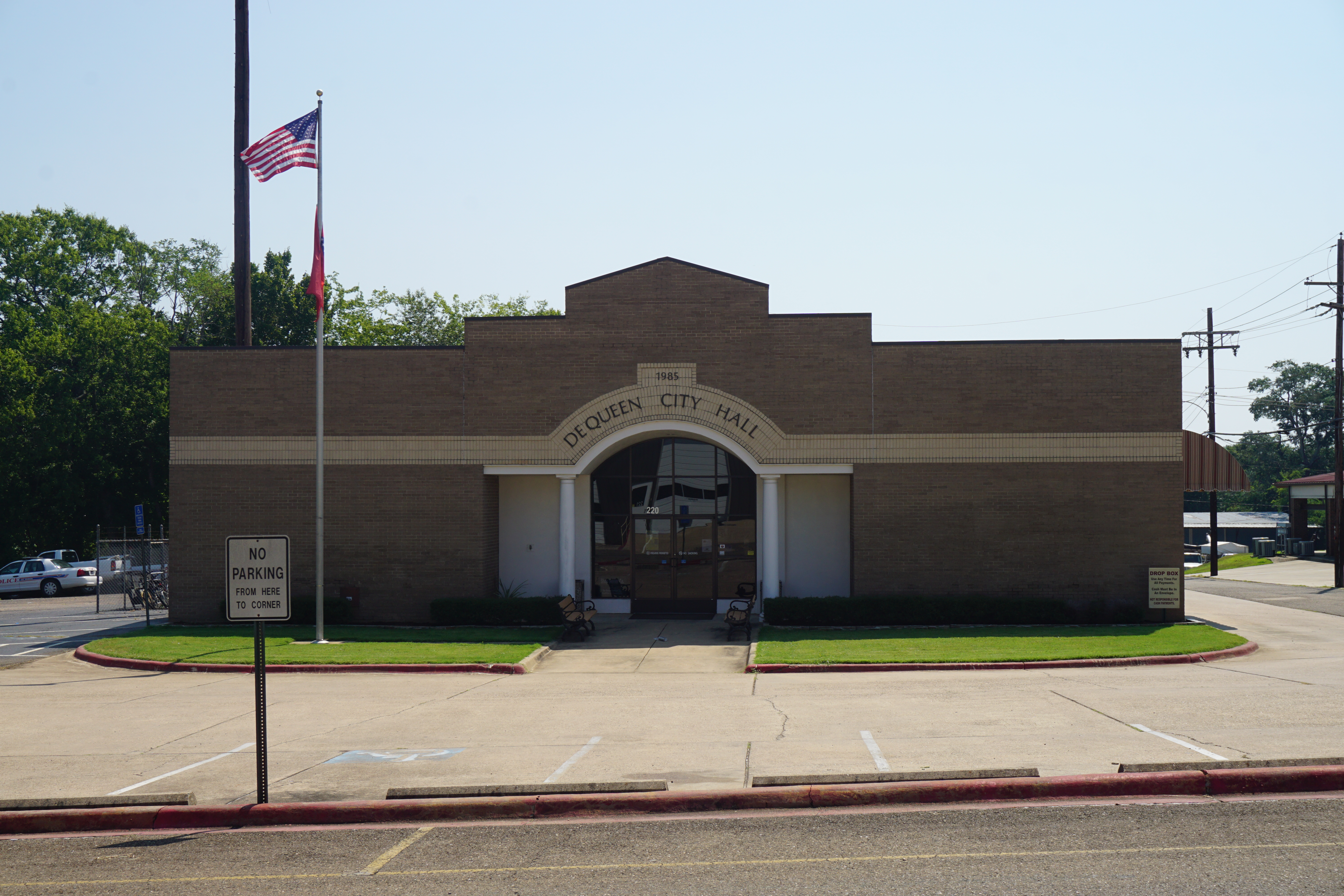
- De Queen City Hall

- Location of De Queen in Sevier County, Arkansas.
- Coordinates: 34°2′24″N 94°20′31″W
- Country: United States
- State: Arkansas
- County: Sevier

Government
  - Mayor: Jeff Brown

Area
  - Total: 6.16 sq mi (15.96 km^{2})
  - Land: 6.06 sq mi (15.70 km^{2})
  - Water: 0.10 sq mi (0.26 km^{2})
- Elevation: 430 ft (130 m)

Population (2020)
  - Total: 6,105
  - Estimate (2025): 6,045 ▼
  - Density: 1,007.4/sq mi (388.95/km^{2})
- Time zone: UTC-6 (CST)
  - Summer (DST): UTC-5 (CDT)
- ZIP code: 71832
- Area code: 870
- FIPS code: 05-18490
- GNIS feature ID: 2404202
- Website: cityofdequeen.com

De Queen (/ˈdiː kwiːn/ DEE-kween) is a city in and the county seat of Sevier County, Arkansas, United States. The population was 6,105 at the 2020 census. The placename is the anglicization of the family name of the Dutch merchant and railway financier, Jan de Goeijen (1861–1944). De Goeijen was reportedly rather unhappy with the deformation of his name.

== Geography ==
De Queen is located at 34°2′24″N 94°20′31″W (34.039994, −94.341964).

According to the United States Census Bureau, the city has a total area of 5.7 square miles (15 km^{2}), of which 5.6 square miles (15 km^{2}) is land and 0.1 square miles (0.26 km^{2}) (1.23%) is water.

== Demographics ==
Historical population
Census	Pop.	Note	%±
1900	1,200		—
1910	2,018		68.2%
1920	2,517		24.7%
1930	2,938		16.7%
1940	3,055		4.0%
1950	3,015		−1.3%
1960	2,859		−5.2%
1970	3,863		35.1%
1980	4,594		18.9%
1990	4,633		0.8%
2000	5,765		24.4%
2010	6,629		15.0%
2020	6,105		−7.9%
2025 (est.)	6,045	▼	−1.0%
U.S. Decennial Census; 2014 Estimate

=== 2020 census ===
As of the 2020 census, De Queen had a population of 6,105. The median age was 29.8 years. 31.7% of residents were under the age of 18 and 11.0% of residents were 65 years of age or older. For every 100 females there were 97.6 males, and for every 100 females age 18 and over there were 93.3 males age 18 and over.

96.1% of residents lived in urban areas, while 3.9% lived in rural areas.

There were 1,967 households in De Queen, including 1,380 family households. Of all households, 45.3% had children under the age of 18 living in them. Of all households, 42.9% were married-couple households, 18.2% were households with a male householder and no spouse or partner present, and 30.8% were households with a female householder and no spouse or partner present. About 25.8% of all households were made up of individuals and 10.9% had someone living alone who was 65 years of age or older.

There were 2,229 housing units, of which 11.8% were vacant. The homeowner vacancy rate was 2.2% and the rental vacancy rate was 10.5%.

De Queen racial composition
Race	Number	Percentage
White (non-Hispanic)	1,720	28.17%
Black or African American (non-Hispanic)	279	4.57%
Native American	80	1.31%
Asian	38	0.62%
Pacific Islander	239	3.91%
Other/Mixed	208	3.41%
Hispanic or Latino	3,541	58.0%

=== 2010 census ===
As of the census of 2010, there were 6,629 people in De Queen. The median age was 29. The ethnic and racial composition of the population was 36.7% non-Hispanic white, 5.6% non-Hispanic black, 2.3% Native American, 0.7% Asian, 35.1% reporting some other race and 4.2% reporting two or more races. 53.5% of the population was Hispanic or Latino of any race.

=== 2000 census ===
As of the census of 2000, there were 5,765 people, 1,913 households, and 1,377 families residing in the city. The population density was 1,024.7 inhabitants per square mile (395.6/km^{2}). There were 2,108 housing units at an average density of 374.7 per square mile (144.7/km^{2}). The racial makeup of the city was 66.40% White, 6.07% Black or African American, 2.38% Native American, 0.21% Asian, 0.10% Pacific Islander, 23.07% from other races, and 1.77% from two or more races. 38.59% of the population were Hispanic or Latino of any race.

There were 1,913 households, out of which 39.0% had children under the age of 18 living with them, 52.7% were married couples living together, 13.2% had a female householder with no husband present, and 28.0% were non-families. 24.0% of all households were made up of individuals, and 11.8% had someone living alone who was 65 years of age or older. The average household size was 2.93 and the average family size was 3.44.

In the city, the population was spread out, with 30.3% under the age of 18, 11.7% from 18 to 24, 28.3% from 25 to 44, 16.8% from 45 to 64, and 12.9% who were 65 years of age or older. The median age was 30 years. For every 100 females, there were 96.9 males. For every 100 females age 18 and over, there were 93.2 males.

The median income for a household in the city was $25,707, and the median income for a family was $31,582. Males had a median income of $21,542 versus $17,367 for females. The per capita income for the city was $12,968. About 21.3% of families and 26.9% of the population were below the poverty line, including 36.7% of those under age 18 and 18.5% of those age 65 or over.

== Climate ==
The climate in this area is characterized by hot, humid summers and generally mild to cool winters. According to the Köppen Climate Classification system, De Queen has a humid subtropical climate, abbreviated "Cfa" on climate maps.

Climate data for De Queen, Arkansas (1991–2020 normals, extremes 1902–present)
Month	Jan	Feb	Mar	Apr	May	Jun	Jul	Aug	Sep	Oct	Nov	Dec	Year
Record high °F (°C)	83 (28)	88 (31)	98 (37)	94 (34)	96 (36)	106 (41)	108 (42)	114 (46)	108 (42)	104 (40)	88 (31)	82 (28)	114 (46)
Mean daily maximum °F (°C)	53.5 (11.9)	58.0 (14.4)	65.8 (18.8)	73.6 (23.1)	80.5 (26.9)	87.9 (31.1)	91.9 (33.3)	92.8 (33.8)	86.5 (30.3)	75.8 (24.3)	64.1 (17.8)	55.4 (13.0)	73.8 (23.2)
Daily mean °F (°C)	41.8 (5.4)	45.7 (7.6)	53.3 (11.8)	60.9 (16.1)	69.4 (20.8)	77.4 (25.2)	81.2 (27.3)	81.2 (27.3)	74.6 (23.7)	63.1 (17.3)	51.9 (11.1)	44.1 (6.7)	62.1 (16.7)
Mean daily minimum °F (°C)	30.1 (−1.1)	33.4 (0.8)	40.7 (4.8)	48.2 (9.0)	58.4 (14.7)	66.9 (19.4)	70.5 (21.4)	69.6 (20.9)	62.6 (17.0)	50.4 (10.2)	39.7 (4.3)	32.9 (0.5)	50.3 (10.2)
Record low °F (°C)	−5 (−21)	−14 (−26)	8 (−13)	25 (−4)	32 (0)	46 (8)	52 (11)	50 (10)	34 (1)	20 (−7)	8 (−13)	−5 (−21)	−14 (−26)
Average precipitation inches (mm)	4.12 (105)	4.15 (105)	5.03 (128)	5.85 (149)	6.25 (159)	4.37 (111)	3.44 (87)	3.34 (85)	4.05 (103)	4.66 (118)	4.44 (113)	5.25 (133)	54.95 (1,396)
Average snowfall inches (cm)	1.1 (2.8)	1.0 (2.5)	0.1 (0.25)	0.0 (0.0)	0.0 (0.0)	0.0 (0.0)	0.0 (0.0)	0.0 (0.0)	0.0 (0.0)	0.0 (0.0)	0.1 (0.25)	0.2 (0.51)	2.5 (6.4)
Average precipitation days (≥ 0.01 in)	8.2	7.8	8.6	8.3	9.5	7.8	6.9	6.0	5.8	7.4	7.4	8.1	91.8
Average snowy days (≥ 0.1 in)	0.4	0.5	0.1	0.0	0.0	0.0	0.0	0.0	0.0	0.0	0.1	0.2	1.3
Source: NOAA

== Transportation ==
De Queen is served by US Route 70, US Route 71, and Arkansas State Highway 41.

Intercity bus service is available from Jefferson Lines.

De Queen has freight rail service through the De Queen and Eastern Railroad.

The J Lynn Helms Sevier County Airport (FAA ID: KDEQ), three miles west of town, has a 5001’ x 75’ paved runway.

== Education ==
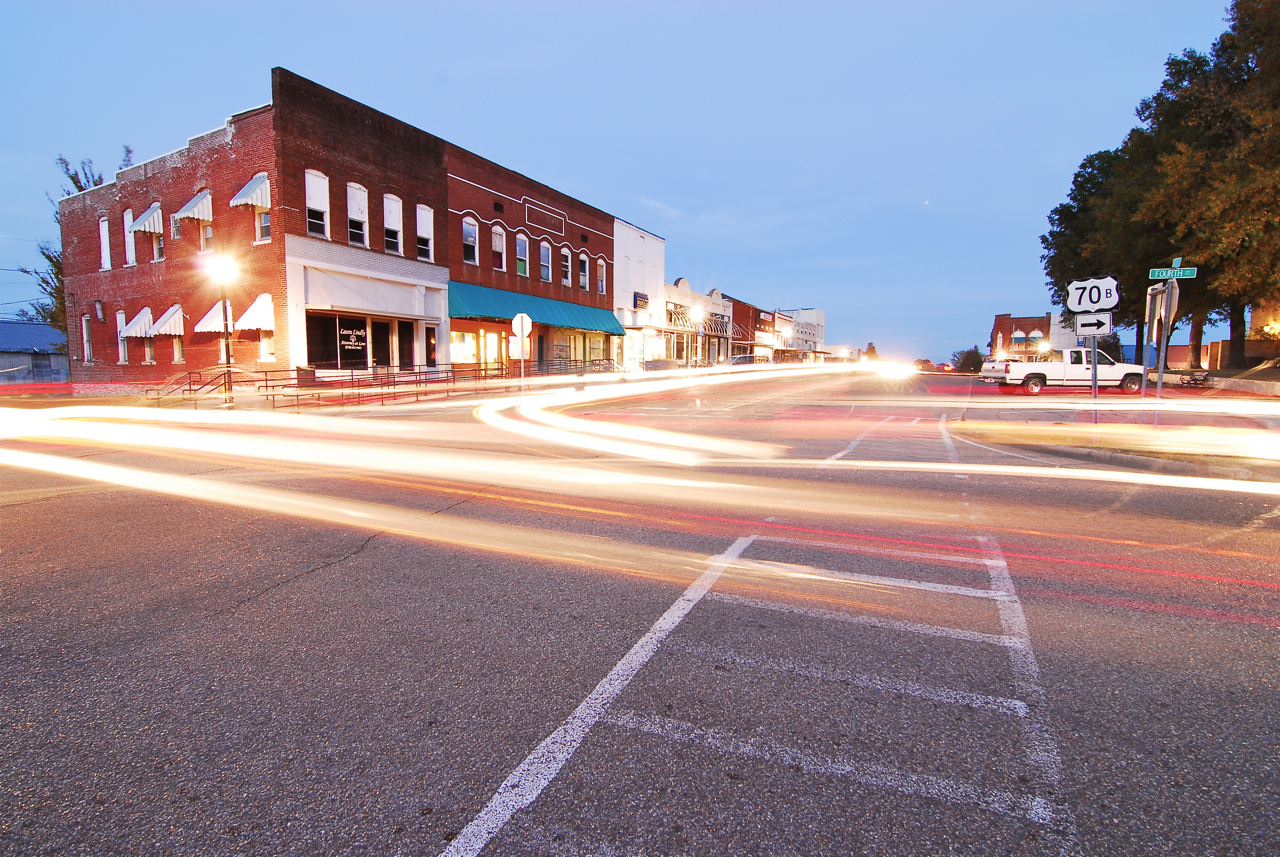
Downtown De Queen

De Queen hosts a campus of the Cossatot Community College of the University of Arkansas. The college also provides non-credit coursework in adult education: GED classes, ESL training, test preparation, and computer literacy.

The DeQueen School District operates area public schools.

== Historic places ==
De Queen has multiple locations on the National Register, including:

- Bishop Brookes House
- DeQueen & Eastern Railroad Machine Shop
- DeQueen Commercial Historic District
- First Presbyterian Church
- Hayes Hardware Store
- Otis Theodore and Effiegene Locke Wingo House

== Notable people ==
- J. Oscar Humphrey, Arkansas State Auditor from 1929 to 1935 and 1937 to 1956
- Collin Raye, country music singer.
- Wes Watkins, Oklahoma politician lived for a time in De Queen as a child.
- Otis Wingo, member of the United States House of Representatives from Arkansas's 4th congressional district, practiced law in De Queen before his congressional career.

== See also ==
Other US places related to De Goeijen ("De Queen"):

- Zwolle, Louisiana (named after his hometown)
- Amsterdam, Missouri (named after his firm's location)
- Vandervoort, Arkansas (mother)
- Mena, Arkansas (wife)
- DeRidder, Louisiana (sister-in-law)
