= Sevier County, Arkansas =

County in Arkansas, United States

- County
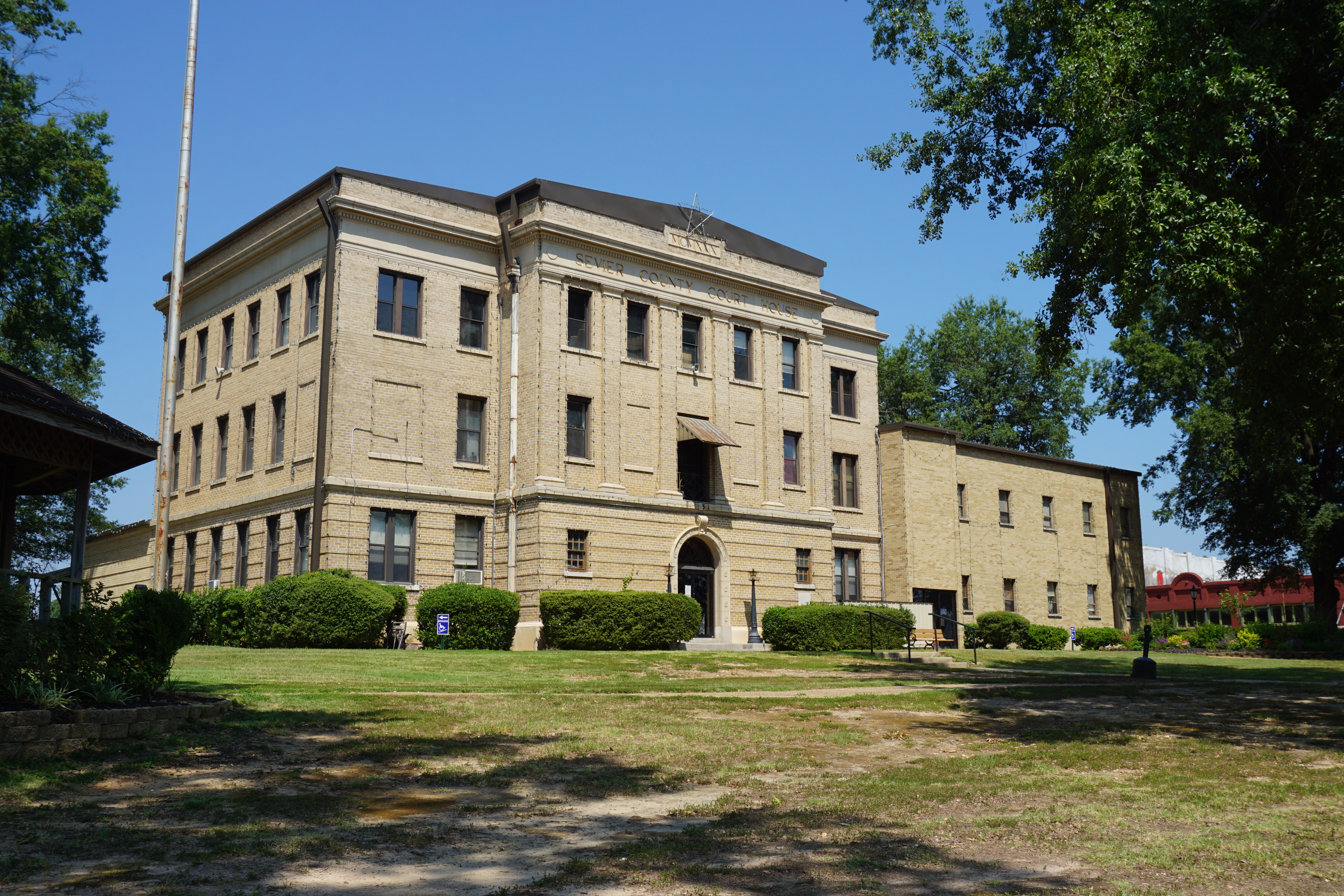
- The Sevier County Courthouse is located in De Queen

- Location within the U.S. state of Arkansas
- Coordinates: 34°00′N 94°15′W
- Country: United States
- State: Arkansas
- Founded: October 17, 1828
- Named for: Ambrose Hundley Sevier
- Seat: De Queen
- Largest city: De Queen

Area
  - Total: 581 sq mi (1,500 km^{2})
  - Land: 565 sq mi (1,460 km^{2})
  - Water: 16 sq mi (41 km^{2}) 2.8%

Population (2020)
  - Total: 15,839
  - Estimate (2025): 15,758 ▼
  - Density: 28.0/sq mi (10.8/km^{2})
- Time zone: UTC−6 (Central)
  - Summer (DST): UTC−5 (CDT)
- Congressional district: 4th
- Website: www.seviercountyar.org

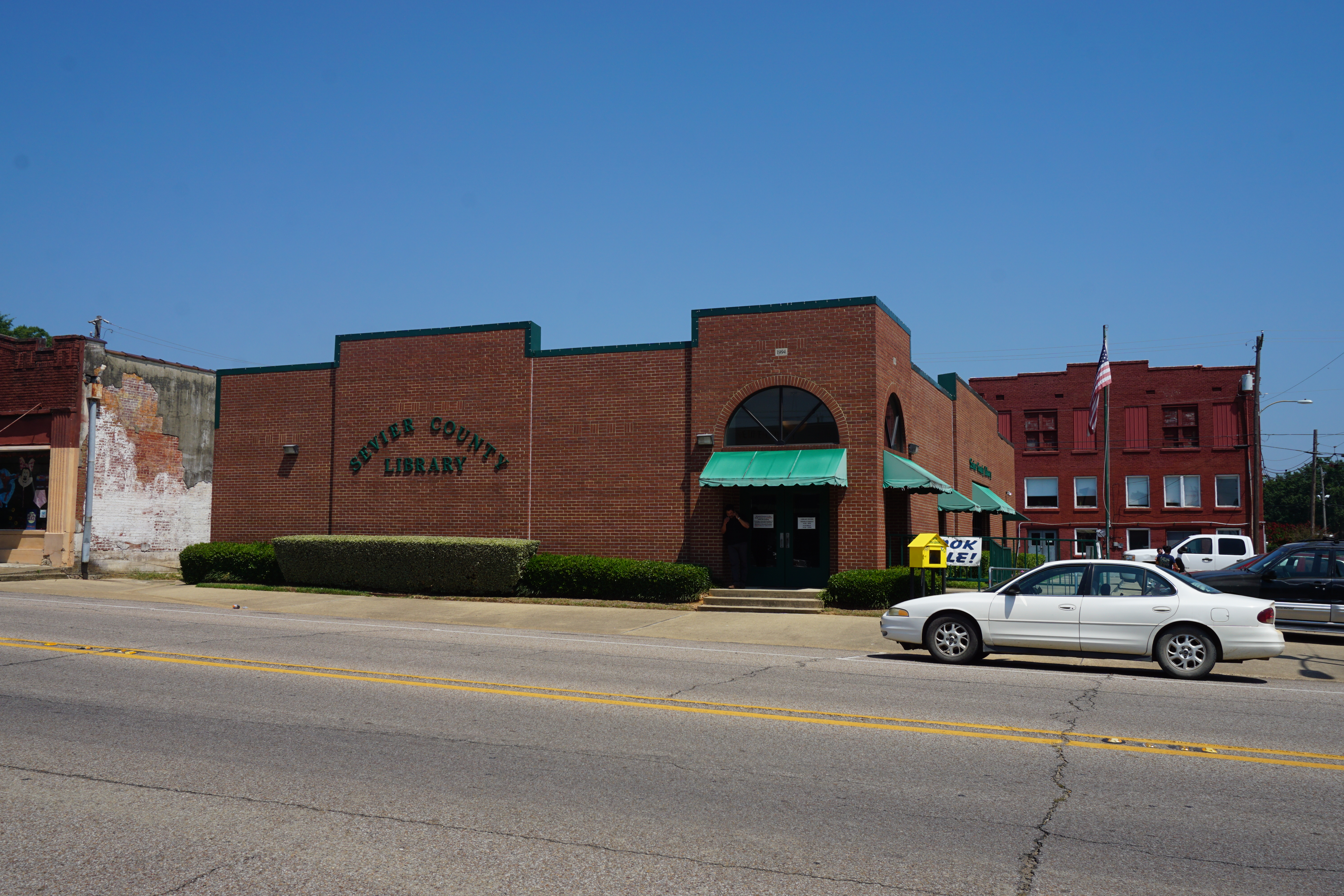
Sevier County Library in De Queen

Sevier County is a county located in the U.S. state of Arkansas. As of the 2020 census, the population was 15,839. The county seat is De Queen. Sevier County is Arkansas's 16th county, formed on October 17, 1828, and named for Ambrose Sevier, U.S. Senator from Arkansas. On November 3, 2020, voters in Sevier County, AR approved alcohol sales by a vote of 3,499 (67.31 percent) to 1,699 (32.69 percent).

== History ==
Sevier County was organized on October 17, 1828, under legislative authority. It was formed from Hempstead and Miller Counties. Five days later on October 22, 1828, the legislature expanded the county's border, incorporating more land south of the Red River. Hempstead, Miller and Crawford Counties as well as the Choctaw Nation in Indian Territory bound Sevier County. The establishment of Sevier County became effective on November 1, 1828.

=== County seat ===
The county seat has undergone several changes since Sevier County was organized. The first county seat was Paraclifta. After an area of Sevier County was carved away to become part of newly created Little River County in 1867, Paraclifta was no longer centrally located.

Three members of a local prominent family—James, William, and Matthew Locke—offered 120 acres (0.49 km^{2}) of land, and Royal Appleton offered 60 acres (0.24 km^{2}) for the site of a new county seat to be named Lockesburg. A petition to establish Lockesburg as the county seat was approved by the county court on January 18, 1869. After a number of local citizens were unwilling to sell land for a route for the Kansas City, Pittsburg, and Gulf Railroad in the late 1890s, the route was laid down through what would become the town of De Queen instead of Lockesburg. In 1905, the county seat was moved to De Queen.

== Geography ==
According to the U.S. Census Bureau, the county has a total area of 581 square miles (1,500 km^{2}), of which 565 square miles (1,460 km^{2}) is land and 16 square miles (41 km^{2}) (2.8%) is water.

Known as "The Land of Lakes", "The Land of Fruits and Flowers" and "The Home of Friendly People," the county has five lakes within a 35-mile (56 km) radius, five rivers and mountain streams and forests.

=== Notable people ===
Current or former residents of Sevier County include:

- Collin Raye, country music singer.
- Wes Watkins, U.S.Congressman (Republican- Oklahoma) lived for a time in De Queen as a child.

=== Major highways ===
- Future Interstate 49
- U.S. Highway 59 / U.S. Highway 71
- U.S. Highway 70
- U.S. Highway 371
- Highway 24
- Highway 27
- Highway 41
- Highway 234
- Highway 317
- Highway 329
- Highway 399

=== Transit ===
- Jefferson Lines

=== Adjacent counties ===
- Polk County (north)
- Howard County (east)
- Hempstead County (southeast)
- Little River County (south)
- McCurtain County, Oklahoma (west)

=== National protected area ===
- Pond Creek National Wildlife Refuge

== Demographics ==
Historical population
Census	Pop.	Note	%±
1830	634		—
1840	2,810		343.2%
1850	4,240		50.9%
1860	10,516		148.0%
1870	4,492		−57.3%
1880	6,192		37.8%
1890	10,072		62.7%
1900	16,339		62.2%
1910	16,616		1.7%
1920	18,301		10.1%
1930	16,364		−10.6%
1940	15,248		−6.8%
1950	12,293		−19.4%
1960	10,156		−17.4%
1970	11,272		11.0%
1980	14,060		24.7%
1990	13,637		−3.0%
2000	15,757		15.5%
2010	17,058		8.3%
2020	15,839		−7.1%
2025 (est.)	15,758	▼	−0.5%
U.S. Decennial Census; 1790–1960 1900–1990 1990–2000 2010

=== 2020 census ===
As of the 2020 census, the county had a population of 15,839. The median age was 36.2 years. 28.0% of residents were under the age of 18 and 15.4% of residents were 65 years of age or older. For every 100 females there were 100.1 males, and for every 100 females age 18 and over there were 97.8 males age 18 and over.

The racial makeup of the county was 60.6% White, 3.6% Black or African American, 3.0% American Indian and Alaska Native, 0.4% Asian, 1.6% Native Hawaiian and Pacific Islander, 19.5% from some other race, and 11.3% from two or more races. Hispanic or Latino residents of any race comprised 34.8% of the population.

37.2% of residents lived in urban areas, while 62.8% lived in rural areas.

There were 5,731 households in the county, of which 37.3% had children under the age of 18 living in them. Of all households, 50.0% were married-couple households, 18.4% were households with a male householder and no spouse or partner present, and 25.2% were households with a female householder and no spouse or partner present. About 25.8% of all households were made up of individuals and 12.1% had someone living alone who was 65 years of age or older.

There were 6,741 housing units, of which 15.0% were vacant. Among occupied housing units, 72.9% were owner-occupied and 27.1% were renter-occupied. The homeowner vacancy rate was 1.3% and the rental vacancy rate was 10.8%.

=== 2000 census ===
As of the 2000 census, there were 15,757 people, 5,708 households, and 4,223 families residing in the county. The population density was 28 people per square mile (11 people/km^{2}). There were 6,434 housing units at an average density of 11 units per square mile (4.2 units/km^{2}). The racial makeup of the county was 79.61% White, 4.94% Black or African American, 1.82% Native American, 0.13% Asian, 0.06% Pacific Islander, 11.84% from other races, and 1.61% from two or more races. 19.72% of the population were Hispanic or Latino of any race. 17.32% reported speaking Spanish at home.

There were 5,708 households, out of which 36.40% had children under the age of 18 living with them, 59.30% were married couples living together, 10.00% had a female householder with no husband present, and 26.00% were non-families. 22.80% of all households were made up of individuals, and 11.00% had someone living alone who was 65 years of age or older. The average household size was 2.73 and the average family size was 3.19.

In the county, the population was spread out, with 28.20% under the age of 18, 9.50% from 18 to 24, 27.70% from 25 to 44, 21.30% from 45 to 64, and 13.20% who were 65 years of age or older. The median age was 34 years. For every 100 females there were 99.10 males. For every 100 females age 18 and over, there were 97.00 males.

The median income for a household in the county was $30,144, and the median income for a family was $34,560. Males had a median income of $25,709 versus $17,666 for females. The per capita income for the county was $14,122. About 14.40% of families and 19.20% of the population were below the poverty line, including 26.90% of those under age 18 and 14.20% of those age 65 or over.

== Government ==
=== Government ===
The county government is a constitutional body granted specific powers by the Constitution of Arkansas and the Arkansas Code. The quorum court is the legislative branch of the county government and controls all spending and revenue collection. Representatives are called justices of the peace and are elected from county districts every even-numbered year. The number of districts in a county vary from nine to fifteen, and district boundaries are drawn by the county election commission. The Sevier County Quorum Court has nine members. Presiding over quorum court meetings is the county judge, who serves as the chief operating officer of the county. The county judge is elected at-large and does not vote in quorum court business, although capable of vetoing quorum court decisions.

Sevier County, Arkansas Elected countywide officials
Position	Officeholder	Party
County Judge	Sandra Dunn	(Unknown)
County Clerk	Renea Bailey	Republican
Circuit Clerk	Kathy Smith	Democratic
Sheriff/Collector	Robert Gentry	Democratic
Treasurer	Heather Barnes	Democratic
Assessor	Sheila Ridley	Republican
Coroner	Rusty Williams	Republican

The composition of the Quorum Court following the 2024 elections is 6 Republicans and 3 Democrats. Justices of the Peace (members) of the Quorum Court following the elections are:

- District 1: Michael Barnes (R) of DeQueen
- District 2: Walter L. Smith Jr. (R) of DeQueen
- District 3: Roxy Ann Stephens (D) of DeQueen
- District 4: Callie Efird (R) of DeQueen
- District 5: Roger Whitmore (D) of Horatio
- District 6: Angie Hughes-Walker (R) of DeQueen
- District 7: Scottie Morris (R) of Gillham
- District 8: Kenneth R. Currence (D) of Lockesburg
- District 9: Greg Wright (R) of Horatio

Additionally, the townships of Sevier County are entitled to elect their own respective constables, as set forth by the Constitution of Arkansas. Constables are largely of historical significance as they were used to keep the peace in rural areas when travel was more difficult. The township constables as of the 2024 elections are:

- Bear Creek: Marc Logazino (R)
- Mineral: Todd Pinkerton (R)

=== Politics ===
Over the past few election cycles, Sevier County has trended heavily towards the GOP. The last Democrat (as of 2024) to carry this county was Arkansas native Bill Clinton in 1996.

United States presidential election results for Sevier County, Arkansas
Year	Republican		Democratic		Third party(ies)	
Year	No.	%	No.	%	No.	%
1896	170	12.66%	1,166	86.82%	7	0.52%
1900	360	31.41%	772	67.36%	14	1.22%
1904	412	33.80%	711	58.33%	96	7.88%
1908	526	28.31%	1,073	57.75%	259	13.94%
1912	174	13.26%	789	60.14%	349	26.60%
1916	244	16.17%	1,265	83.83%	0	0.00%
1920	599	29.99%	1,236	61.89%	162	8.11%
1924	270	18.28%	931	63.03%	276	18.69%
1928	524	29.39%	1,259	70.61%	0	0.00%
1932	162	7.39%	2,009	91.61%	22	1.00%
1936	289	19.27%	1,200	80.00%	11	0.73%
1940	293	17.49%	1,374	82.03%	8	0.48%
1944	389	22.28%	1,356	77.66%	1	0.06%
1948	267	14.53%	1,314	71.53%	256	13.94%
1952	1,130	40.29%	1,673	59.64%	2	0.07%
1956	1,159	43.28%	1,500	56.01%	19	0.71%
1960	1,141	40.25%	1,580	55.73%	114	4.02%
1964	1,249	36.92%	2,123	62.75%	11	0.33%
1968	1,217	31.64%	1,129	29.35%	1,501	39.02%
1972	2,526	69.91%	1,048	29.01%	39	1.08%
1976	1,468	30.10%	3,391	69.53%	18	0.37%
1980	2,502	45.52%	2,854	51.92%	141	2.57%
1984	3,302	62.64%	1,942	36.84%	27	0.51%
1988	2,254	52.09%	2,037	47.08%	36	0.83%
1992	1,592	31.77%	2,558	51.05%	861	17.18%
1996	1,379	31.16%	2,553	57.69%	493	11.14%
2000	2,111	49.17%	2,095	48.80%	87	2.03%
2004	2,516	54.68%	2,035	44.23%	50	1.09%
2008	3,125	68.23%	1,291	28.19%	164	3.58%
2012	3,136	72.42%	1,042	24.06%	152	3.51%
2016	3,282	71.94%	1,075	23.56%	205	4.49%
2020	3,884	74.66%	1,116	21.45%	202	3.88%
2024	3,772	80.02%	862	18.29%	80	1.70%

== Communities ==
=== Cities ===
- De Queen (county seat)
- Horatio
- Lockesburg

=== Towns ===
- Ben Lomond
- Gillham

=== Townships ===
Townships in Arkansas are the divisions of a county. Each township includes unincorporated areas; some may have incorporated cities or towns within part of their boundaries. Arkansas townships have limited purposes in modern times. However, the United States census does list Arkansas population based on townships (sometimes referred to as "county subdivisions" or "minor civil divisions"). Townships are also of value for historical purposes in terms of genealogical research. Each town or city is within one or more townships in an Arkansas county based on census maps and publications. The townships of Sevier County are listed below; listed in parentheses are the cities, towns, and/or census-designated places that are fully or partially inside the township.

- Bear Creek (contains most of De Queen)
- Ben Lomond (contains Ben Lomond)
- Buckhorn
- Clear Creek (contains Horatio)
- Jefferson
- Mill Creek
- Mineral (contains Gillham)
- Monroe (contains small part of De Queen)
- Paraclifta
- Red Colony (contains Lockesburg)
- Saline
- Washington

== See also ==
- List of lakes in Sevier County, Arkansas
- National Register of Historic Places listings in Sevier County, Arkansas
