= 2023 McCurtain County, Oklahoma audio recording scandal =

Oklahoma political scandal

The 2023 McCurtain County, Oklahoma, audio recording scandal was a political scandal in McCurtain County, Oklahoma, in which multiple county officials (Sheriff Kevin Clardy, Commissioner Mark Jennings, Investigator Alicia Manning, and Jail Administrator Larry Hendrix) were revealed to have made controversial remarks in an audio recording released in April 2023. The previous month, the McCurtain Gazette-News filed a lawsuit against various county officials. The same day the paper filed suit, one of its reporters left a voice-activated audio recorder in the room after a county meeting and recorded county officials discussing various controversial topics such as lynching Black people, murdering McCurtain Gazette-News reporters, and assaulting county judges.

The McCurtain Gazette-News's release of the audio a month after its recording led to national coverage of the scandal, calls from Governor Kevin Stitt for the officials to resign, and the start of an OSBI investigation. Mark Jennings, McCurtain County Commissioner for the 2nd District, resigned April 19. After his resignation, Oklahoma Attorney General Gentner Drummond announced his office had begun an investigation into corruption in the county two weeks earlier. On June 18, 2024, Clardy lost his bid for reelection, earning just 18.26% of the vote in the Republican primary.

In 2026, a documentary film about the scandal, Kill. Bury. Print., was released.

== Background ==
McCurtain County, Oklahoma, is in a part of Southeastern Oklahoma sometimes called "Little Dixie" because of the influx of white Southerners who moved to the region (then part of the Choctaw Nation in Indian Territory) from the former Confederate States after the American Civil War. While Idabel (the county seat) officially desegregated its schools in 1954, the town maintained two neighborhood high schools to maintain de facto segregation for more than a decade. In 1980, the killing of Henry Johnson, a Black teenager, resulted in a riot that killed two more people. McCurtain County is one of Oklahoma's most racially diverse counties but remains highly economically and racially segregated.

On March 6, the McCurtain Gazette-News brought suit against the McCurtain County Board of County Commissioners, the county Sheriff's Office, Sheriff Kevin Clardy, and county investigator Alicia Manning in federal court. According to the lawsuit, the newspaper published an eight-part investigative series from 2021 to 2022. The series covered the county jail, botched homicide investigations, and rumors of an affair between Clardy and Manning as well as various allegations of corruption. The same day McCurtain Gazette-News publisher Bruce Willingham left a voice-activated audio recorder inside a room after a county meeting because he suspected people were conducting county business after meetings had ended in violation of the state's Open Meeting Act.

Former McCurtain County Sheriff's Office officials have claimed the department has a toxic culture, alleging officers fantasized about killing unarmed Black protestors during the 2020 George Floyd protests. After the recording's release, Oklahoma attorney general Gentner Drummond revealed his office had begun investigating corruption in the county two weeks earlier, saying, "there is something rotten in McCurtain County.”

== Audio recording ==
In April 2023, the McCurtain Gazette-News released audio recordings of local officials discussing hiring a hit man to murder the paper's publisher and reporter Chris Willingham. In the recording, they also lamented that lynching Black people was no longer acceptable, discussed assaulting local judges, and complained Black people had more rights than they did.

=== Investigations ===
The Oklahoma State Bureau of Investigation and Attorney General Gentner Drummond investigated the incident. After the investigation, Drummond announced he found no grounds under Oklahoma law to remove the elected officials and encouraged citizens not to reelect the officials in the next election.

The FBI has stated it does not confirm or deny active investigations.

The McCurtain County Sheriff's Office is investigating the newspaper for the alleged illegality of the audio recording. The office alleges both that the recording was altered and that its production violated the Oklahoma Security of Communications Act, which requires one party to consent to recording.

=== Responses ===
Oklahoma Governor Kevin Stitt said that he was "both appalled and disheartened to hear of the horrid comments made by officials in McCurtain County". He called for the local officials to resign, including "McCurtain County Sheriff Kevin Clardy, District 2 Commissioner Mark Jennings, Investigator Alicia Manning, and Jail Administrator Larry Hendrix." He later said his office was looking to impeach Clardy if he did not resign and formally requested Attorney General Gentner Drummond to investigate Clardy. State representative Eddy Dempsey, Idabel mayor Craig Young, and state senator George Burns also called for the officials' resignations. Congressman Josh Brecheen called for those involved to be "held accountable." Over 100 people gathered outside the county courthouse calling on the officials to resign.

In response, the McCurtain County Sheriff's Office released a statement on Facebook reading:

There is and has been an ongoing investigation into multiple, significant violation of the Oklahoma Security of Communications Act ... which states that it is illegal to secretly record a conversation ... Many of these recordings, like the one published by media outlets on Friday, have yet to be duly authenticated or validated. Our preliminary information indicates that the media released audio recording has, in fact, been altered. ... In addition to being illegally obtained, the audio does not match the "transcription" of that audio, and is not precisely consistent with what has been put into print. Multiple agencies are assisting in this ongoing investigation. ... There will be continued press releases from this agency as the investigation comes to a close and findings are forwarded to the appropriate authorities for felony charges to be filed on those involved.

A Tulsa World editorial described the incident as white supremacist and racist because of Jennings's comments about missing the days when law enforcement could arrest Black people and "take them down to Mud Creek and hang them up with a rope.” It also called on the officials to resign or be removed from office.

=== Aftermath ===
On April 18, the Oklahoma Sheriff's Association suspended Clardy, Manning and Hendrix. In May, Hendrix was put on paid leave.

Also on April 18, there was a bomb threat against the McCurtain County Memorial Hospital in Idabel, Oklahoma. The day before the bomb threat, the hospital went on a precautionary lockdown during peaceful protests in the town.

==== Jennings's resignation ====
Jennings resigned on April 19. Governor Stitt set a special election for September 12, 2023. On June 13, Republican Tina Foshee-Thomas and Democrat Tony Hill won their respective primaries. Foshee-Thomas later won the general election.

== Other lawsuits ==
Willingham also filed a federal lawsuit alleging that Manning "told a third party during a teleconference that Chris Willingham exchanged marijuana for sexually explicit images of children from a man who had been arrested on child sex abuse image charges".

In December 2020, Travienna Edd's son filed a lawsuit against the McCurtain County jail trust, alleging jail employees neglected his mother's health needs after she died in her jail cell from "lung cancer, with heart disease, dehydration, and diabetes as contributing factors." The county responded that her "death was the result of natural causes and her own refusal to accept medical treatment and/or participate in her own health care."

In June 2022, former jail inmate Roper Harris alleged in a federal civil rights lawsuit that Clardy and deputies used excessive force while arresting him by pushing him down a flight of stairs and forcing onto the pavement on his face; the suit also alleged that jail employees purposely put him in a cell with violent offenders who beat him and then denied him medical care in September 2021.

On April 20, 2023, the widow of Bobby Dale Barrick, a Tulsa man who had died in McCurtain County custody, filed suit in federal court against the Board of County Commissioners, Sheriff Clardy, three McCurtain County deputies, and a game warden. The lawsuit claims the county sheriff officers turned their body cameras off before beating and tasing Barrick, resulting in his hospitalization and death.
