= List of dam removals in Arkansas =

This is a list of dams in Arkansas that have been removed as physical impediments to free-flowing rivers or streams.

== Completed removals ==
| Dam | Height | Year removed | Location | Watercourse | Watershed |
|---|---|---|---|---|---|
| Winton Springs Dam | 4 ft (1.2 m) | | | | |
| Hot Springs Park Ricks Lower #1 Dam | 11 ft (3.4 m) | 1986 | | | |
| Huntsville Dam (War Eagle Creek Dam) | 9 ft (2.7 m) | 2023 | Madison County; 36.0863°N 93.704°W | War Eagle Creek | White River |
| Mill Creek Hollow Dam | 18 ft (5.5 m) | | Newton County; 36.0738°N 93.1366°W | Mill Creek | White River |
| Kellys Slab | | 2011 | Marion County; 36.2294°N 92.7106°W | Crooked Creek | White River |
| Mine Creek Dam | 5 ft (1.5 m) | 2020 | Polk County; 34.4466°N 94.1236°W | Mine Creek | Little River |
| Lake St. Francis Dam | 45 ft (14 m) | 1989 | Johnson; 35.0714°N 90.7593°W | Crow Creek | St. Francis River |
