= Sherwood, Oklahoma =

- Unincorporated community
- Location within Oklahoma Location within the United States
- Coordinates: 34°19′52″N 94°46′42″W
- Country: United States
- State: Oklahoma
- County: McCurtain
- Elevation: 1,040 ft (320 m)
- Time zone: UTC-6 (Central (CST))
  - Summer (DST): UTC-5 (CDT)
- Area code: Area code 580
- GNIS feature ID: 1100830

Sherwood is an unincorporated community in McCurtain County, Oklahoma, United States. The community is 4 miles (6.4 km) southeast of Bethel. A post office opened in Sherwood on March 20, 1912. The community was named for early settler Sherwood Davis.
