= Cloudy Creek =

Stream in Pushmataha County, Oklahoma, U.S.

Coordinates: 34.327602°N 95.198848°W

- Location in Oklahoma

Location
- Country: United States
- State: Oklahoma

Physical characteristics
- Source
  - location: Ouachita Mountains, Pushmataha County, Oklahoma, United States
- Mouth
  - location: Confluence with Little River, Pushmataha County

Cloudy Creek is a stream in Pushmataha County, Oklahoma, United States. It is a tributary of the Little River and part of the Mississippi River watershed. The creek flows through the Ouachita Mountains region in southeastern Oklahoma.

== History ==
Cloudy Creek was named for the cloudy or muddy appearance of its water, a characteristic noted by early settlers and surveyors.

== Geography ==
Cloudy Creek originates in the Ouachita Mountains of southeastern Oklahoma and flows generally southward to join the Little River. The stream is located within Pushmataha County and drains a watershed characterized by steep hills, sandstone outcrops, and mixed forests of oak, pine, and hickory.

== See also ==
- List of rivers of Oklahoma
- Little River (Red River)
