= List of lakes of Ashley County, Arkansas =

There are at least 23 named lakes and reservoirs in Ashley County, Arkansas.

== Lakes ==
- Anthony Lake, 33°11′02″N 091°34′13″W, el. 112 feet (34 m)
- Clear Lake, 33°18′29″N 091°58′24″W, el. 82 feet (25 m)
- Coffee Lake, 33°02′43″N 092°04′06″W, el. 62 feet (19 m)
- Cooley Lake, 33°02′09″N 092°05′26″W, el. 56 feet (17 m)
- Lake Enterprise, 33°03′32″N 091°35′36″W, el. 102 feet (31 m)
- Lake Georgia Pacific, 33°15′13″N 092°02′42″W, el. 66 feet (20 m)
- Lake Lingo, 33°16′12″N 091°31′04″W, el. 125 feet (38 m)
- Marais Saline, 33°09′50″N 092°06′46″W, el. 69 feet (21 m)
- Mossy Lake, 33°02′33″N 092°04′33″W, el. 62 feet (19 m)
- Mud Lake, 33°15′26″N 092°02′31″W, el. 72 feet (22 m)
- Redeye Lake, 33°07′14″N 092°06′33″W, el. 62 feet (19 m)
- Sanders Lake, 33°12′52″N 091°33′47″W, el. 118 feet (36 m)
- Wilson Brake, 33°13′07″N 091°32′00″W, el. 125 feet (38 m)

== Reservoirs ==
- Lake Georgia-Pacific, 33°13′58″N 092°02′04″W, el. 85 feet (26 m)
- Lake Granpus, 33°20′24″N 091°33′06″W, el. 125 feet (38 m)
- Lucas Pond, 33°06′55″N 091°58′24″W, el. 141 feet (43 m)
- Mill Pond, 33°06′39″N 092°01′39″W, el. 102 feet (31 m)
- Ouachita River Reservoir, 33°01′54″N 092°05′18″W, el. 69 feet (21 m)
- Riley Lake, 33°21′42″N 091°43′12″W, el. 174 feet (53 m)
- Shiloh Lake, 33°20′24″N 091°45′48″W, el. 197 feet (60 m)
- Stone Lake, 33°18′06″N 091°41′18″W, el. 174 feet (53 m)
- Wilson Brake Reservoir, 33°12′58″N 091°32′04″W, el. 112 feet (34 m)
- Young Lake, 33°14′00″N 091°37′54″W, el. 177 feet (54 m)

== See also ==
- List of lakes in Arkansas
