= Pond Creek National Wildlife Refuge =

National wildlife refuge in Sevier County, Arkansas

- IUCN category IV (habitat/species management area)
- Location within the United States
- Location: Sevier County, Arkansas, United States
- Nearest city: De Queen, Arkansas
- Coordinates: 33°51′N 94°15′W
- Area: 27,300 acres (110 km^{2})
- Established: 1994
- Governing body: U.S. Fish and Wildlife Service
- Website: Pond Creek National Wildlife Refuge

Pond Creek National Wildlife Refuge (NWR) is a 27,300 acre (110 km^{2}) national wildlife refuge located in Sevier County, Arkansas. Pond Creek NWR is one of three refuges forming an administrative complex, which also includes Felsenthal NWR and Overflow NWR to the east.

== Habitat and wildlife ==
The refuge consists of nearly 30,000 acres of bottomland hardwood forests and is bordered on the east and west by the Cossatot River and the Little River. Pond Creek’s bottomland hardwood forests are dissected by an intricate system of rivers, sloughs, and oxbow lakes. Because the refuge is situated in an area where the Mississippi and Central flyways overlap, waterfowl species from both flyways can be observed.

== History ==
Pond Creek National Wildlife Refuge (NWR) was established in 1994 under the authority of the Emergency Wetlands Resources Act of 1986. The refuge was originally named "Cossatot", after the Cossatot River that flows on the refuge’s eastern boundary. By the request of local citizens, the refuge’s name was changed in 1997 to retain the previous name that the area was known by – "Pond Creek Bottoms".
