= Rolling Fork =

Rolling Fork can refer to several place names in the United States:

- Rolling Fork (Arkansas), a river
- Rolling Fork (Kentucky), a river, a branch of the Salt River
- Rolling Fork, Mississippi, a city

== See also ==
- 2023 Rolling Fork–Silver City tornado
