= List of lakes of Drew County, Arkansas =

There are at least 11 named lakes and reservoirs in Drew County, Arkansas.

== Lakes ==
- Austin Brake, 33°40′00″N 091°27′15″W, el. 141 feet (43 m)
- Big Lake, 33°34′52″N 091°36′18″W, el. 118 feet (36 m)

== Reservoirs ==
- Bynum Lake, 33°30′20″N 091°33′56″W, el. 161 feet (49 m)
- Byrd Lake, 33°41′53″N 091°40′49″W, el. 180 feet (55 m)
- Dura Craft Lake, 33°37′55″N 091°49′49″W, el. 217 feet (66 m)
- Hopper Pond, 33°43′00″N 091°54′00″W, el. 161 feet (49 m)
- Lake Wallace, 33°27′09″N 091°27′09″W, el. 125 feet (38 m)
- Marsh Lake, 33°44′46″N 091°57′46″W, el. 148 feet (45 m)
- Seven Devils Lake, 33°33′13″N 091°34′29″W, el. 131 feet (40 m)
- Seven Devils Swamp, 33°33′12″N 091°34′30″W, el. 131 feet (40 m)
- Wells Lake, 33°42′12″N 091°35′12″W, el. 164 feet (50 m)

== See also ==
- List of lakes in Arkansas
