= Pickens, Oklahoma =

Unincorporated community in Oklahoma, US

Coordinates: 34°23′47″N 95°00′43″W

Pickens is an unincorporated community in western McCurtain County, Oklahoma, United States. The community is in the Silver Creek Valley in the Ouachita Mountains. The community of Clebit lies adjacent to the southwest along Little Silver Creek.

It was named for John T. Pickens, the first postmaster. The post office was established October 26, 1912 and remains operational, with the ZIP code of 74952.
