= Golden, Oklahoma =

Unincorporated community in Oklahoma, US

- Census-designated place
- Location within Oklahoma Location within the United States
- Coordinates: 34°01′53″N 94°53′52″W
- Country: United States
- State: Oklahoma
- County: McCurtain

Area
  - Total: 0.81 sq mi (2.10 km^{2})
  - Land: 0.81 sq mi (2.10 km^{2})
  - Water: 0 sq mi (0.00 km^{2})
- Elevation: 394 ft (120 m)

Population (2020)
  - Total: 71
  - Density: 87.7/sq mi (33.85/km^{2})
- Time zone: UTC-6 (Central (CST))
  - Summer (DST): UTC-5 (CDT)
- ZIP code: 74737
- Area code: Area code 580
- GNIS feature ID: 2805319
- FIPS code: 40-29800

Golden is an unincorporated community and census-designated place (CDP) in McCurtain County, Oklahoma, United States. As of the 2020 census, it had a population of 71.

== History ==
Golden has a post office with ZIP code 74737, which opened on March 13, 1911.

The community was named for its first postmaster, James M. Golden.

On April 2, 1982, a destructive F5 tornado ravaged the small community at F4 intensity where it destroyed a ranch-style home.

== Geography ==
Golden is in central McCurtain County, 14 miles (23 km) by road northwest of Idabel, the county seat, and 9 miles (14 km) west of Broken Bow. According to the U.S. Census Bureau, the Golden CDP has an area of 0.81 square miles (2.10 km^{2}), of which 0.001 square miles (0.003 km^{2}), or 0.12%, are water. The town is less than 3 miles (5 km) northeast of the Little River, a southeast-flowing tributary of the Red River.

== Demographics ==
Historical population
Census	Pop.	Note	%±
2020	71		—
U.S. Decennial Census

Golden was first classified as a census-designated place for the 2020 census.

=== 2020 census ===
As of the 2020 census, Golden had a population of 71. The median age was 35.8 years. 19.7% of residents were under the age of 18 and 23.9% of residents were 65 years of age or older. For every 100 females there were 121.9 males, and for every 100 females age 18 and over there were 147.8 males age 18 and over.

0.0% of residents lived in urban areas, while 100.0% lived in rural areas.

There were 31 households in Golden, of which 12.9% had children under the age of 18 living in them. Of all households, 80.6% were married-couple households, 3.2% were households with a male householder and no spouse or partner present, and 16.1% were households with a female householder and no spouse or partner present. About 9.7% of all households were made up of individuals and 0.0% had someone living alone who was 65 years of age or older.

There were 32 housing units, of which 3.1% were vacant. The homeowner vacancy rate was 0.0% and the rental vacancy rate was 0.0%.

Racial composition as of the 2020 census
Race	Number	Percent
White	43	60.6%
Black or African American	0	0.0%
American Indian and Alaska Native	14	19.7%
Asian	0	0.0%
Native Hawaiian and Other Pacific Islander	0	0.0%
Some other race	0	0.0%
Two or more races	14	19.7%
Hispanic or Latino (of any race)	1	1.4%

== Education ==
It is in the Glover Public School school district.
