= Oklahoma State Highway 4 =

State highway in Oklahoma, United States

State Highway 4
- OK 4 mainline in red

Route information
- Maintained by ODOT OTA
- History: 1941–present (western SH-4); 1963–present (eastern SH-4)

Section 1
- Length: 37.3 mi (60.0 km)
- South end: US 62 / US 277 / SH-9 south of Newcastle
- North end: Edmond Road / NW 178th Street in Piedmont

Section 2
- Length: 12.01 mi (19.33 km)
- West end: US 259 in Smithville
- East end: AR 4 at the Arkansas state line near Cove, AR

Location
- Country: United States
- State: Oklahoma

Highway system
- Oklahoma State Highway System; Interstate; US; State; Turnpikes
← SH-3	→ SH-5

State Highway 4, abbreviated as SH-4 or OK-4, is a designation for two distinct highways maintained by the U.S. state of Oklahoma. One of them serves as an important route through the suburbs west of Oklahoma City, while the other connects US-259 to the Arkansas state line west of Cove, Arkansas. SH-4 has no lettered spur routes.

The two SH-4s were never connected. The Central Oklahoma highway was established in 1941 and gradually extended to its present extent between then and 2003. The Oklahoma–Arkansas highway was originally numbered SH-21, and was renumbered to SH-4 in 1963.

== Route description ==
=== Section 1 (Central Oklahoma) ===
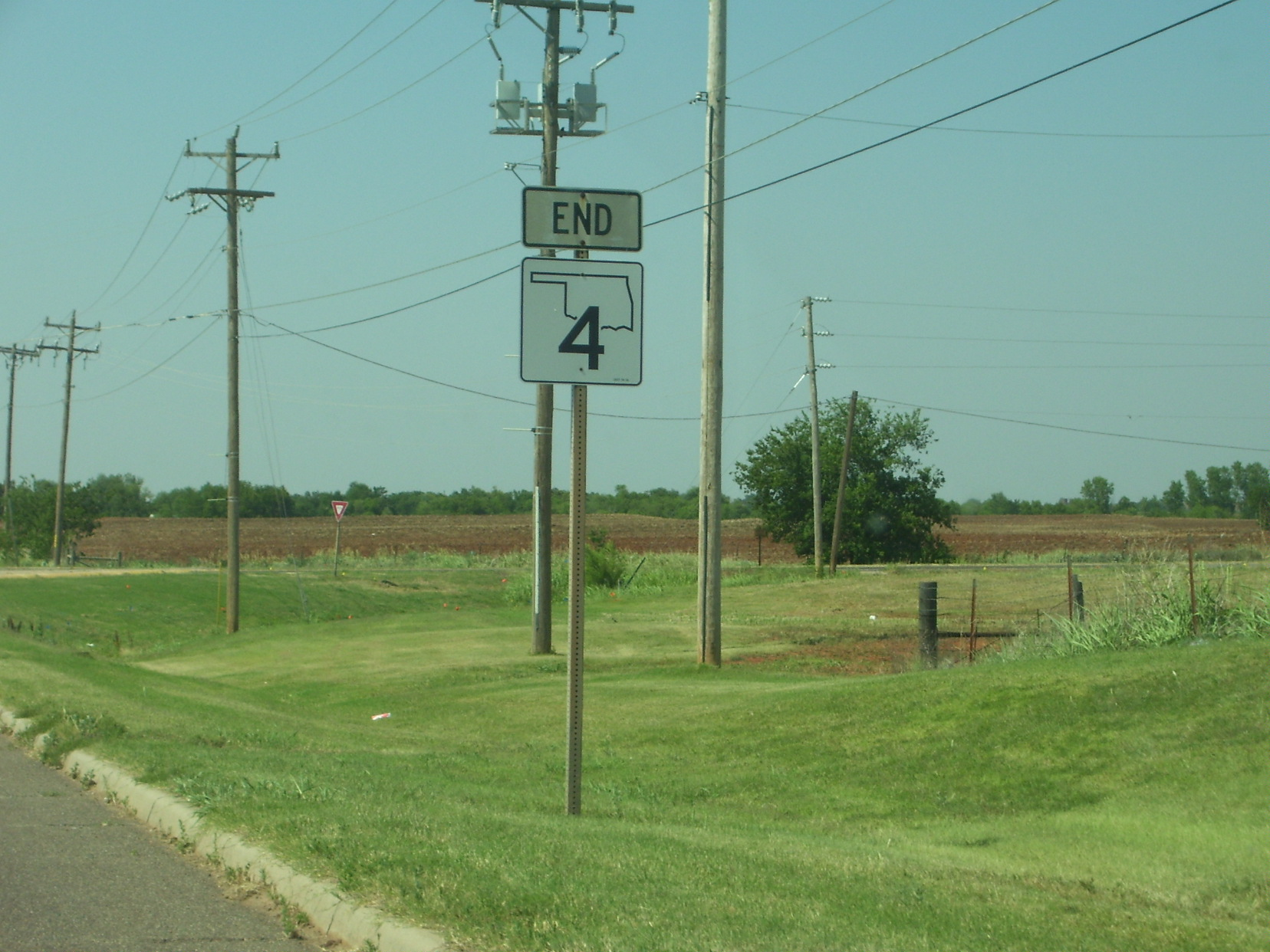
The northern end of SH-4 in Piedmont.

The western Highway 4 is 37.3 miles (60.0 km) long. It begins at the eastern terminus of the H.E. Bailey Turnpike Spur south of Newcastle, Oklahoma. Beyond the western terminus of the tolled spur, SH-4 turns northward as a two-lane road until it reaches SH-37, where it expands to four lanes. Seven miles (11 km) later, it joins with SH-152 in the town of Mustang. One mile (1.6 km) later, SH-4 continues northward along Mustang Road toward Interstate 40 and Yukon.

After crossing I-40, SH-4 becomes a two-lane road once again until entering Yukon, at which point it becomes a four-lane road again. It meets SH-66, once Route 66, in Yukon. Seven miles (11 km) later, it meets the Northwest Expressway (SH-3). It lasts for just three miles (4.8 km) longer until ending at Edmond Road in Piedmont.

Just after crossing SH-3, there is a standard distance sign listing Piedmont and "END OF ROUTE", giving the distance to the terminus of SH-4. This is a relative rarity on Oklahoma highways.

=== Section 2 (Oklahoma–Arkansas) ===
The eastern Highway 4 is 12.01 miles (19.33 km) long. It begins at US-259 and goes generally east–west, passing through the unincorporated communities of Smithville and Watson. After crossing the Arkansas state line, it becomes Arkansas Highway 4.

== History ==
=== Central Oklahoma ===
The western SH-4 was assigned in 1941 to a previously unnumbered roadway between U.S. Highway 66 in Yukon and Piedmont. A continuation of SH-4 east to North May Avenue in Oklahoma City along Ranchwood Boulevard and NW 10th Street had been designated as a farm-to-market road four years earlier. In 1954, SH-4 was extended eastward along the farm-to-market road to a terminus at State Highway 3 and State Highway 74 (May Avenue) southwest of downtown Oklahoma City.

SH-4 remained unchanged until 1979 when it was truncated to its former southern terminus at US-66 in Yukon. The route was then extended to Mustang in 1982, following Ranchwood Boulevard and Mustang Road south to a new terminus at State Highway 152. Construction on a southward extension of SH-4 to State Highway 37 near Tuttle began in 2001 and was completed a year later, as was a new segment between SH-37 and the H.E. Bailey Turnpike (Interstate 44). SH-4 was originally signed only as far south as SH-37; the designation was extended south to I-44 in early 2003.

On August 9, 2021, the Oklahoma Transportation Commission voted to approve the addition of the State Highway 4 designation to the H.E. Bailey Spur.

=== Oklahoma–Arkansas ===
State Highway 21
- Location: Smithville to Arkansas state line
- Length: 12.01 mi (19.33 km)
- Existed: 1927–1963

What is now the eastern SH-4 became part of State Highway 21 in 1927 when SH-21 was rerouted north of Bethel to follow modern U.S. Highway 259 and SH-4 to the Arkansas state line. The SH-21 designation was removed in 1963 and replaced with SH-4 from Smithville east to the state line near Watson. Only minor realignments, such as the straightening of the roadway near Smithville and the replacement of a historic truss bridge by a modern span have occurred since.

== Junction list ==
=== Central Oklahoma section ===
County	Location	mi	km	Destinations	Notes
McClain	Blanchard	0.00	0.00	SH-9 east – Norman; US 62 (US 277) / SH-9 west – Newcastle	Southern terminus; highway continues east as SH 9
See H. E. Bailey Norman Spur
Grady	Bridge Creek	7.8	12.6	I-44 Toll (H.E. Bailey Turnpike) – Oklahoma City, Chickasha, Lawton	
Grady	Bridge Creek			CR 1226	Last free junction southbound
Grady	Tuttle	11.8	19.0	SH-37 – Tuttle Business District	
Canadian River				State Rep. Tim Pope Memorial Bridge	
Canadian	Mustang	17.4	28.0	SH-152 east	Southern terminus of SH-152 concurrency
Canadian	Mustang	18.4	29.6	SH-152 west	Northern terminus of SH-152 concurrency
Canadian	Oklahoma City	23.9	38.5	I-40 / US 270 – Amarillo, Oklahoma City	I-40 EB exit 138A, WB exit 139
Canadian	Yukon	27.0	43.5	SH-66 east (Main Street east)	Southern terminus of SH-66 concurrency
Canadian	Yukon	27.3	43.9	SH-66 west (Main Street west)	Northern terminus of SH-66 concurrency; Main St. is former US 66
Canadian	Oklahoma City	34.0	54.7	SH-3 (Northwest Expressway)	
Canadian	Piedmont	37.3	60.0	NW 178th Street (Edmond Road)	Northern terminus; roadway continues as Piedmont Road
1.000 mi = 1.609 km; 1.000 km = 0.621 mi: Concurrency terminus; Tolled

=== Oklahoma–Arkansas section ===
State	County	Location	mi	km	Destinations	Notes
Oklahoma	McCurtain	Smithville	0.00	0.00	US 259	Western terminus
Oklahoma–Arkansas line			12.01 0.00	19.33 0.00	SH-4 ends AR 4 begins	
Arkansas	Polk	Cove	2.99	4.81	US 71 / US 59 – Mena, DeQueen	Eastern terminus
1.000 mi = 1.609 km; 1.000 km = 0.621 mi
