= List of dams and reservoirs in Arkansas =

The following is a list of dams and reservoirs in Arkansas.

All major dams are linked below. The National Inventory of Dams defines any "major dam" as being 50 feet (15 m) tall with a storage capacity of at least 5,000 acre-feet (6,200,000 m^{3}), or of any height with a storage capacity of 25,000 acre-feet (31,000,000 m^{3}).

== Dams and reservoirs in Arkansas ==
Greers Ferry Dam

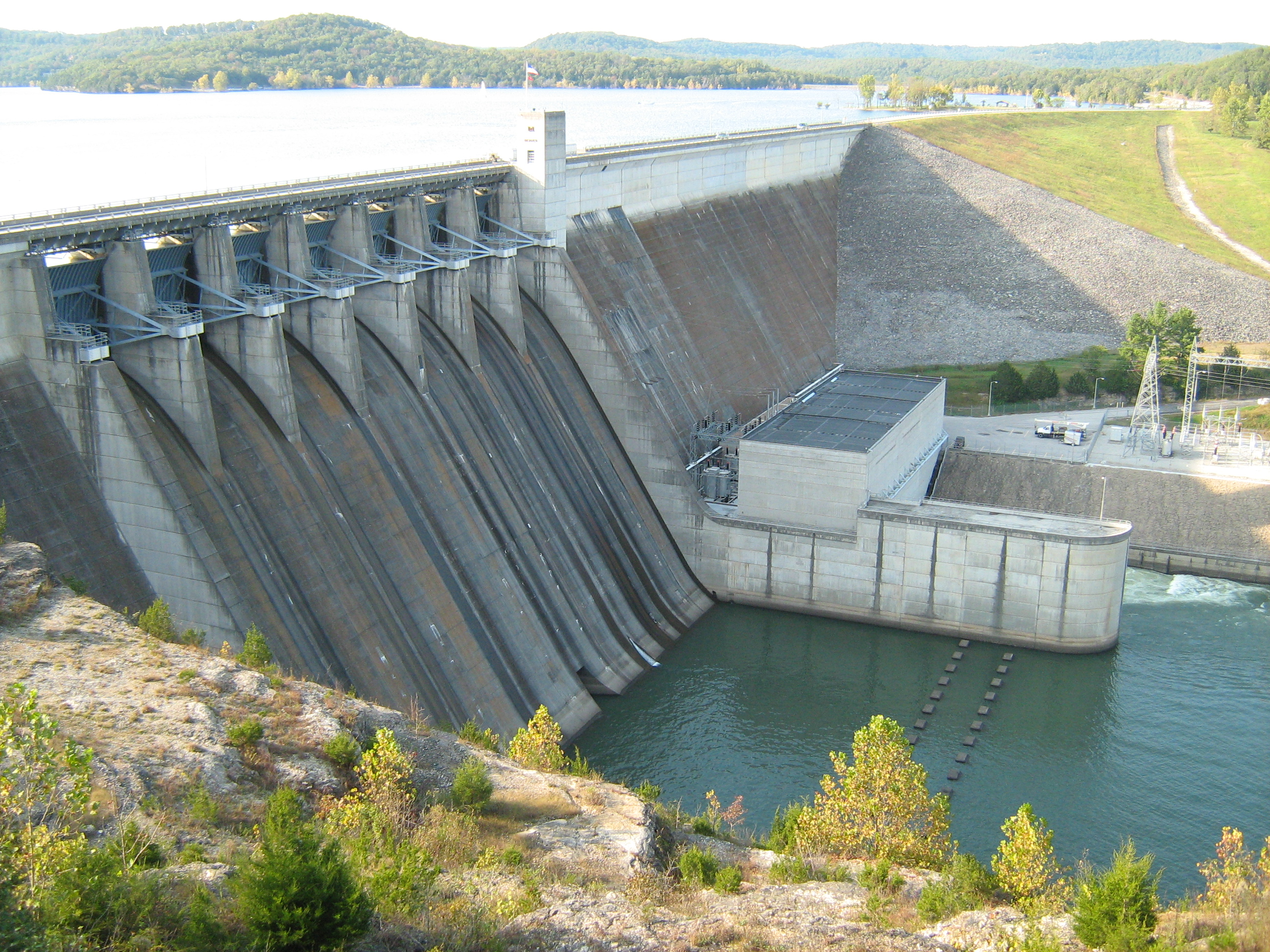
Beaver Dam

This list is incomplete. You can help Wikipedia by expanding it.

- Lake Atalanta Dam, Lake Atalanta, City of Rogers, Arkansas
- Beaver Dam, Beaver Lake, United States Army Corps of Engineers
- Blakely Mountain Dam, Lake Ouachita, USACE
- Blue Mountain Dam, Blue Mountain Lake, USACE
- Bull Shoals Dam, Bull Shoals Lake, USACE
- Carpenter Dam, Lake Hamilton, Entergy
- Lake Conway Dam, Lake Conway, Arkansas Fish and Game Commission
- Dardanelle Lock and Dam, Lake Dardanelle, USACE
- DeGray Dam, DeGray Lake, USACE
- DeQueen Dam, DeQueen Lake, USACE
- Dierks Dam, Dierks Lake, USACE
- Lake Fayetteville Dam, Lake Fayetteville, Ciy of Fayetteville, Arkansas
- Felsenthal Lock and Dam, Lake Jack Lee, USACE
- Lake Fort Smith Dam, Lake Fort Smith, City of Fort Smith, Arkansas
- Galla Creek Dam, Galla Creek Lake, City of Atkins, Arkansas
- Lake Georgia Pacific Dam, Lake Georgia Pacific, Georgia-Pacific
- Gillham Dam, Gillham Lake, USACE
- Greers Ferry Dam, Greers Ferry Lake, USACE
- Little Flint Creek Dam, Lake Flint Creek, Southwestern Electric Power Company
- Millwood Dam, Millwood Lake, USACE
- Murray Lock and Dam No. 7, Arkansas River, Little Rock, Arkansas, USACE
- Narrows Dam, Lake Greeson, USACE
- Nimrod Dam, Nimrod Lake, USACE
- Norfork Dam, Norfork Dam, USACE
- Arthur V. Ormond Lock and Dam, Winthrop Rockefeller Lake, USACE
- Remmel Dam, Lake Catherine, Entergy
- Seven Devils Dam, Seven Devils Lake, Arkansas Fish and Game Commission
- Wilbur D. Mills Dam, unnamed reservoir on the Arkansas River, USACE

== See also ==
- List of dam removals in Arkansas
- List of Arkansas rivers
