= USS Cossatot =

Oiler of the United States Navy

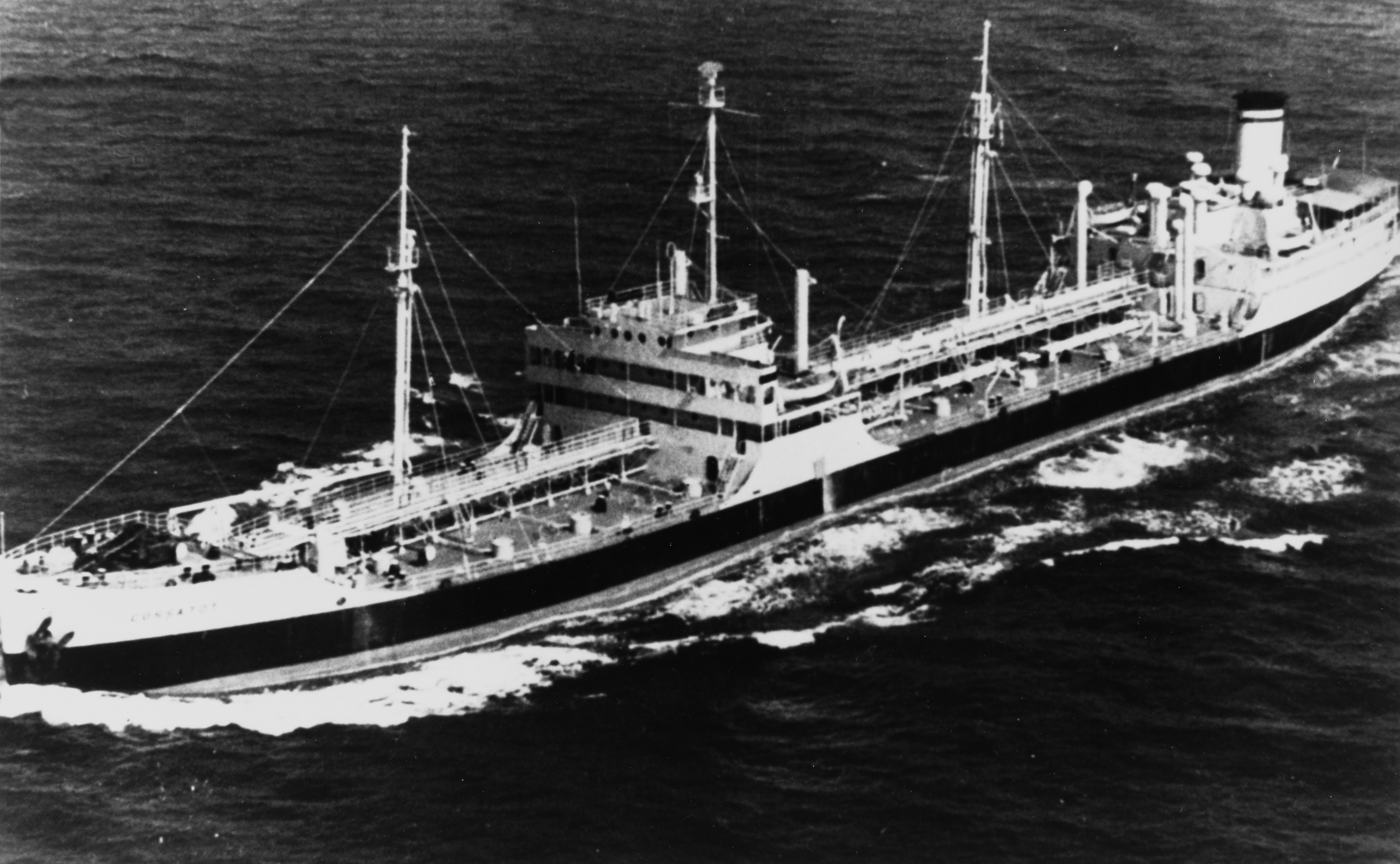
- USNS Cossatot (T-AO-77) underway in the 1950s

History

United States
- Name: USS Cossatot
- Namesake: Cossatot River in Arkansas
- Builder: Sun Shipbuilding & Drydock Co., Chester, Pennsylvania
- Laid down: 24 October 1942
- Launched: 28 February 1943
- Commissioned: 20 April 1943
- Decommissioned: 7 March 1946
- In service: 1947
- Out of service: 1974
- Honors and awards: 2 battle stars (World War II)
- Fate: Sold, 2 September 1975

General characteristics
- Type: Suamico-class fleet replenishment oiler
- Displacement: 5,782 long tons (5,875 t) light; 21,800 long tons (22,150 t) full
- Length: 523 ft 6 in (159.56 m)
- Beam: 68 ft (21 m)
- Draft: 30 ft (9.1 m)
- Propulsion: Turbo-electric, single screw, 8,000 hp (5,966 kW)
- Speed: 15.5 knots (28.7 km/h; 17.8 mph)
- Boats & landing craft carried: 4 × Elco PT boats
- Capacity: 140,000 barrels (22,000 m^{3})
- Complement: 251
- Armament: 1 × 5"/38 caliber gun; 4 × 3"/50 caliber guns; 4 × twin 40 mm Bofors AA guns; 4 × twin 20 mm AA guns

USS Cossatot (AO-77) was a United States Navy World War II Type T2-SE-A1 tanker which served as a fleet oiler. Launched as SS Fort Necessity on 28 February 1943 by the Sun Shipbuilding & Dry Dock Co., Chester, Pennsylvania, under a Maritime Commission contract; sponsored by Mrs. W. Taylor; acquired by the Navy on 17 March 1943; and commissioned on 20 April 1943. It was named for a river in Arkansas.

== World War II ==
Sailing from Norfolk to Baytown, Texas, to load kerosene, gasoline, and fuel oil in July 1943, Cossatot sailed from Norfolk on 6 August to fuel convoy escorts during their passage to Casablanca, returning to Norfolk on 14 September. She made seven such voyages from Norfolk to the North African ports of Casablanca, Oran, and Bizerte between 4 October 1943 and 30 November 1944.

Cossatot put to sea from Norfolk again on 28 December 1944 bound for the Pacific. She loaded diesel oil, fuel oil, and gasoline at Aruba, Netherlands West Indies, and arrived at Pearl Harbor on 30 January 1945. She operated from Saipan from 12 February fueling ships of the 6th Fleet until 3 March, when she began operations from Ulithi. Cossatot sortied as a part of TG 60.8, the logistics group for the 6th Fleet, for operations off Iwo Jima from 13 March to 12 April. On 16 April she sailed with her group to conduct fueling operations off newly assaulted Okinawa. On 28 April she downed a suicide plane as it dove toward her, and remained on this duty unscathed until 4 May when she arrived at Ulithi to reload. From 26 May until the official surrender by Japan on 15 August 1945, Cossatot operated out of Ulithi fueling various units of fast carrier TF 38, engaged in the final strikes against the Japanese homeland.

Cossatot left Ulithi on 3 September for Okinawa and Sasebo, arriving on 21 September to fuel ships of the occupation force. On 12 November she sailed from Yokosuka for San Francisco, arriving on 26 November 1945.

Cossatot received two battle stars for World War II service.

== Post-war ==
Cossatot was placed out of commission in reserve 7 March 1946 and transferred to the Maritime Commission on 28 October 1946. Reacquired in February 1948, she was transferred to the Military Sea Transportation Service on 1 October 1949 where she has served in a noncommissioned status under the Maritime Administration.

While underway in the Pacific Ocean on 16 April 1963 Cossatot reported seeing an unidentified flying object on a straight and fast course in the skies. It was described as glowing, and star-like, and on a trajectory at about 20 degrees and an altitude around 20,000 feet (6,100 m). No investigation was put forward.

On 15 June 1968 Cossatot was damaged after a collision with the merchant vessel Copper State, in fog, off the coast of Santa Cruz, California. Cossatot was carrying 130,000 barrels (21,000 m^{3}) of jet fuel and lost 20 feet (6.1 m) of her bow section in this collision. Cossatot was stricken on 18 September 1974 and sold 2 September 1975.

Beginning in September 1975, Cossatot was broken up by Luria Bros & Co Inc.
