= Kill. Bury. Print. =

- Directed by: Ben Klein
- Produced by: Ben Klein; Joshua Rofé; Steven J. Berger; Rachel Maddow; Lukas Cox; Phil Griffin; Jack Bohrer; Ben Warhit; Colleen Hall
- Edited by: Connor Smith; Lukas Cox (co-editor)
- Distributed by: Peacock
- Release date: September 27, 2026
- Running time: 87 minutes
- Country: United States
- Language: English

Kill. Bury. Print. is a 2026 American documentary film about journalism, press intimidation, and corrupt police in the small town of Idabel, Oklahoma. It is directed by Ben Klein. Journalist Rachel Maddow is listed as one of the producers. The film was released on Peacock on September 27, 2026.

== Synopsis ==
The McCurtain Gazette starts reporting on alleged crime in the McCurtain County sheriff's office, including violent crime, drug crime and sex-related crime. The family, Bruce and Gwen Willingham and their son and daughter-in-law, Chris and Angie, that run the small newspaper start to find themselves targeted by the sheriff. The paper obtains a recording, apparently of the sheriff and officials discussing having the family killed and buried.

== Awards ==
Kill. Bury. Print. won the 2026 David Carr Award at the Montclair Film Festival.

== See also ==
- 2023 McCurtain County, Oklahoma audio recording scandal
