= Rufe, Oklahoma =

Unincorporated community in Oklahoma, US

Coordinates: 34°07′25″N 95°08′39″W

Location of Rufe within the state of Oklahoma.

Rufe is an unincorporated community in western McCurtain County, Oklahoma, United States, 10 miles northwest of Wright City.

A United States Post Office was established at Rufe, Indian Territory on February 13, 1903. It was named for Rufus Wilson, husband of Mattie Wilson, first postmaster.

Until the advent of Oklahoma's statehood in 1907 Rufe was located in Cedar County, Choctaw Nation, in the Indian Territory. Its residents had much in common with those of other communities in the area, some of which, such as Rattan are now included in Pushmataha County.

Pine Creek Lake is to the east; Hugo Lake and Hugo Lake State Park are further to the west-southwest.
