= McCurtain Gazette-News =

Newspaper in Oklahoma, United States

- Type: Newspaper
- Founded: 1905
- Headquarters: Idabel, Oklahoma
- Website: mccurtaingazettenews.com

The McCurtain Gazette-News is a local newspaper published in McCurtain County, Oklahoma. Founded in Idabel, Oklahoma, in 1905, the paper gained national attention for recording and publishing audio of county officials leading to the 2023 McCurtain County, Oklahoma audio recording scandal.

== History ==
The McCurtain Gazette-News was founded in Idabel, Oklahoma, in 1905 as the Idabel Signal. The paper has been published by Bruce Willingham and the Willingham family since 1988. In 2023, the paper had a circulation of about 4,400 readers and published three issues weekly. The Gazette typically covers local events, provides district court coverage, and occasionally reprints old articles from their microfilm archives.

The paper received national attention in 2023 when reporter Chris Willingham recorded, published, and reported on an audio recording of county officials discussing killing him and other controversial remarks resulting in the 2023 McCurtain County, Oklahoma audio recording scandal. A film about the scandal, Kill. Bury. Print. was released in 2026.
