= Winthrop Rockefeller Lake =

- Location within Arkansas
- Location: Conway / Pope / Yell counties, Arkansas, United States
- Coordinates: 35°10.2′N 92°59′W
- Type: reservoir
- Primary inflows: Arkansas River
- Primary outflows: Arkansas River
- Basin countries: United States
- Surface elevation: 286 feet (87 m)

Winthrop Rockefeller Lake is an impounded section of the Arkansas River in Conway, Pope, and Yell counties, Arkansas. Named for Governor Winthrop A. Rockefeller (1912–1973). It extends almost 30 miles (50 km) along the river, from the Arthur V. Ormond Lock and Dam (35°7′30″N 92°47′14″W) below Mile 177 near Morrilton, to the Dardanelle Lock and Dam (35°14′55″N 93°10′15″W) above Mile 205 near Dardanelle. Lake Dardanelle (el. 338 ft or 103 m) begins immediately above Rockefeller Lake.

The Arkansas River lakes have been popular with fishermen because of their large supply of catfish, white bass, bream, crappie, and other species of bass. Fishing is not the only reason for visitors, however; Petit Jean Mountain is close to the area and provides scenic views for visitors along the lake. The Ozark and Ouachita Mountains also offer great scenery and have mountain springs and recreation parks in abundance. The mountains of the Ozarks and Ouachitas are abundant in wildlife. The bald eagle often uses this area for wintering. Eagles can be seen here from late fall through early spring.

== See also ==
- List of Arkansas dams and reservoirs
