= Rolling Fork (Arkansas) =

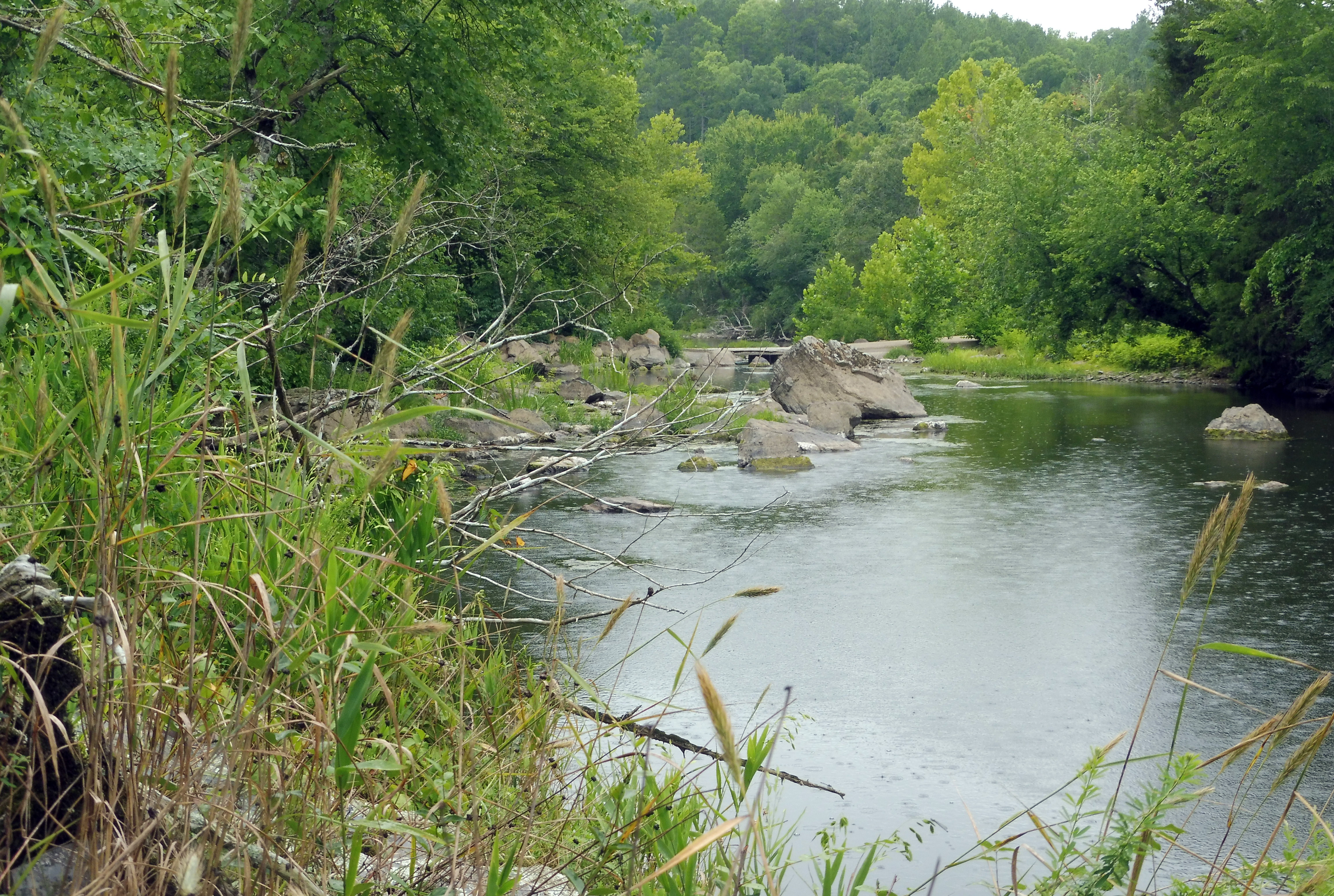

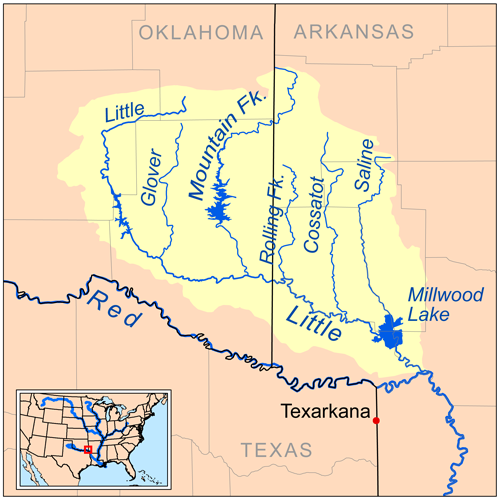
- Map of the Little River watershed showing the Rolling Fork

Location
- Country: United States
- State: Arkansas

Physical characteristics
- Source: Polk County, Arkansas
  - coordinates: 34.35150°N 94.34799°W
- Mouth: Confluence with the Red River
  - location: Sevier County, Arkansas
  - coordinates: 33.94067°N 94.3968°W
- Length: 55.4 mi (89.2 km)

The Rolling Fork is a 55.4-mile-long (89.2 km) river located in southwestern Arkansas, United States. It originates in Polk County, Arkansas, and flows southward, where it is dammed by the DeQueen Dam to form DeQueen Lake.

Rolling Fork is a tributary of the Little River, and runs generally parallel to other nearby tributaries, including the Cossatot River, the Saline River, the Mountain Fork, and the Glover River. The river is part of the larger Mississippi River watershed.

== Location ==
Mouth
Confluence with the Little River in Sevier County, Arkansas 33°56′26″N 94°23′49″W
Source
Polk County, Arkansas 34°21′05″N 94°20′53″W

== Course ==
Rolling Fork originates near Hatton, Arkansas, and flows southward through the towns of Wickes and Grannis. Approximately ten miles from its source, the river enters DeQueen Lake, a man-made reservoir created by the DeQueen Dam. Near Chapel Hill and DeQueen, Arkansas, Rolling Fork exits the lake and continues its course until it joins the Little River.

== See also ==
- List of Arkansas rivers
