= Ben Jordan (bull rider) =

American bull rider (1931–2022)

- Born: Benjamine Franklin Jordan Jr. November 30, 1931; Smithville, Oklahoma, U.S.
- Died: March 19, 2022 (aged 90); Valliant, Oklahoma, U.S.
- Occupation: Bull rider
- Spouse: Roxie Scott (m. 1950; died. 2008)
- Children: 5

Benjamine Franklin Jordan Jr. (November 11, 1931 – March 19, 2022) was an American bull rider.

== Life and career ==
Jordan was born in Smithville, Oklahoma, the son of Benjamine Jordan Sr. and Blondella Hopper. At an early age, he had a passion for rodeo.

In 1956, Jordan competed at the Coalgate Rodeo at Medicine Springs Arena in Coalgate, Oklahoma, placing first in the bull riding event. He joined the International Professional Rodeo Association in 1959. During his rodeo career, he competed at the IRA Bareback Riding World Championships from 1961 to 1965 and again in 1968, winning the titles of bull riding and all-around.

In 2021, Jordan was inducted into the Bull Riding Hall of Fame.

== Personal life and death ==
In 1950, Jordan married Roxie Scott. Their marriage lasted until her death in 2008.

Jordan died on March 19, 2022 in Valliant, Oklahoma, at the age of 90.
