= Smithville, Oklahoma =

Smithville, Oklahoma Hattak Vbi (Choctaw)
- Town
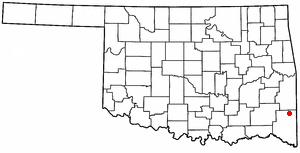
- Location in Oklahoma
- Coordinates: 34°28′08″N 94°38′46″W
- Country: United States
- State: Oklahoma
- County: McCurtain

Area
  - Total: 1.10 sq mi (2.85 km^{2})
  - Land: 1.09 sq mi (2.83 km^{2})
  - Water: 0.0077 sq mi (0.02 km^{2})
- Elevation: 742 ft (226 m)

Population (2020)
  - Total: 77
  - Density: 70/sq mi (27.2/km^{2})
- Time zone: UTC-6 (Central (CST))
  - Summer (DST): UTC-5 (CDT)
- ZIP Code: 74957
- Area code: 580
- FIPS code: 40-68250
- GNIS feature ID: 2413299

Smithville is a town in McCurtain County, Oklahoma, United States. Its population was 77 at the 2020 census, down from 113 in 2010. Smithville has the distinction of being the wettest spot in Oklahoma ranked by highest annual average precipitation, at 55.71 inches (1,415 mm).

== Geography ==
Smithville is in northern McCurtain County, just east of U.S. Route 259 on State Highway 4. The town is in an area in the southeastern corner of Oklahoma known as Little Dixie. U.S. 259 leads south 50 miles (80 km) to Idabel, the McCurtain county seat, and north over the Kiamichi Mountains 19 miles (31 km) to Big Cedar. Cove, Arkansas, is 14 miles (23 km) to the east via Highway 4.

According to the U.S. Census Bureau, Smithville has a total area of 1.1 square miles (2.8 km^{2}), of which 0.01 square miles (0.03 km^{2}), or 0.82%, are water. The town is just north of the Mountain Fork River and about 10 miles (16 km) north of the north end of Broken Bow Lake.

== Demographics ==
Historical population
Census	Pop.	Note	%±
1930	319		—
1940	290		−9.1%
1950	256		−11.7%
1960	110		−57.0%
1970	144		30.9%
1990	127		—
2000	123		−3.1%
2010	113		−8.1%
2020	77		−31.9%
U.S. Decennial Census

=== 2020 census ===
As of the 2020 census, Smithville had a population of 77. The median age was 42.5 years. 13.0% of residents were under the age of 18 and 23.4% of residents were 65 years of age or older. For every 100 females there were 63.8 males, and for every 100 females age 18 and over there were 67.5 males age 18 and over.

0.0% of residents lived in urban areas, while 100.0% lived in rural areas.

There were 40 households in Smithville, of which 30.0% had children under the age of 18 living in them. Of all households, 50.0% were married-couple households, 25.0% were households with a male householder and no spouse or partner present, and 25.0% were households with a female householder and no spouse or partner present. About 27.5% of all households were made up of individuals and 20.0% had someone living alone who was 65 years of age or older.

There were 51 housing units, of which 21.6% were vacant. The homeowner vacancy rate was 10.0% and the rental vacancy rate was 18.8%.

Racial composition as of the 2020 census
Race	Number	Percent
White	52	67.5%
Black or African American	0	0.0%
American Indian and Alaska Native	21	27.3%
Asian	0	0.0%
Native Hawaiian and Other Pacific Islander	0	0.0%
Some other race	2	2.6%
Two or more races	2	2.6%
Hispanic or Latino (of any race)	3	3.9%

=== 2010 census ===
As of the census of 2010, 113 people, 53 households, and 28 families were residing in the town. The population density was 111 people per square mile (39/km^{2}). The 65 housing units had an average density of 60/sq mi (23/km^{2}). The racial makeup of the town was 58.4% White, 34.5% Native American, and 7.1% from two or more races. Hispanics or Latinos of any race were 2.7% of the population.

Of the 53 households, 32% included children under 18, 34% were married couples living together, 17% had a female householder with no husband present, and 47% were not families. Individuals living alone accounted for 47% of households and those individuals 65 or older living alone accounted for 21% of households. The average household size was 2.13, and the average family size was 3.07.

In the town, the age distribution was 31% under 18, 7% from 18 to 24, 22% from 25 to 44, 25% from 45 to 64, and 15% who were 65 or older. The median age was 32 years.

The median income for a household in the town was $21,136, and for a family was $16,083. The per capita income for the town was $15,674. There were 61.9% of families and 45.2% of the population living below the poverty line.

== Education ==
It is in the Smithville Public Schools school district.

== Notable people ==
- Ben Jordan, bull rider
- Curtis McDaniel, politician

== See also ==
- List of towns in Oklahoma
