= Clebit, Oklahoma =

- Unincorporated community
- Location within Oklahoma Location within the United States
- Coordinates: 34°23′25″N 95°01′13″W
- Country: United States
- State: Oklahoma
- County: McCurtain
- Elevation: 866 ft (264 m)
- Time zone: UTC-6 (Central (CST))
  - Summer (DST): UTC-5 (CDT)
- Area code: Area code 580
- GNIS feature ID: 1091448

Clebit is an unincorporated community in McCurtain County, Oklahoma, United States. The community is 11 miles (18 km) west of Bethel. A post office opened in Clebit on May 7, 1924. The community was named for sawmill foreman John Clebo.
