= Watson, Oklahoma =

Unincorporated community in Oklahoma, US

Coordinates: 34°26′14″N 94°33′37″W

Watson is an unincorporated community in McCurtain County, Oklahoma, United States. It is located along State Highway 4 in northeastern McCurtain County. Watson has a post office, which was established on January 25, 1908. It remains operational and uses the ZIP code 74963.

== Education ==
There was formerly a Watson Public School school district. In 2010 the district ceased operations and consolidated into Smithville Public Schools.
