= Tom, Oklahoma =

- Unincorporated community
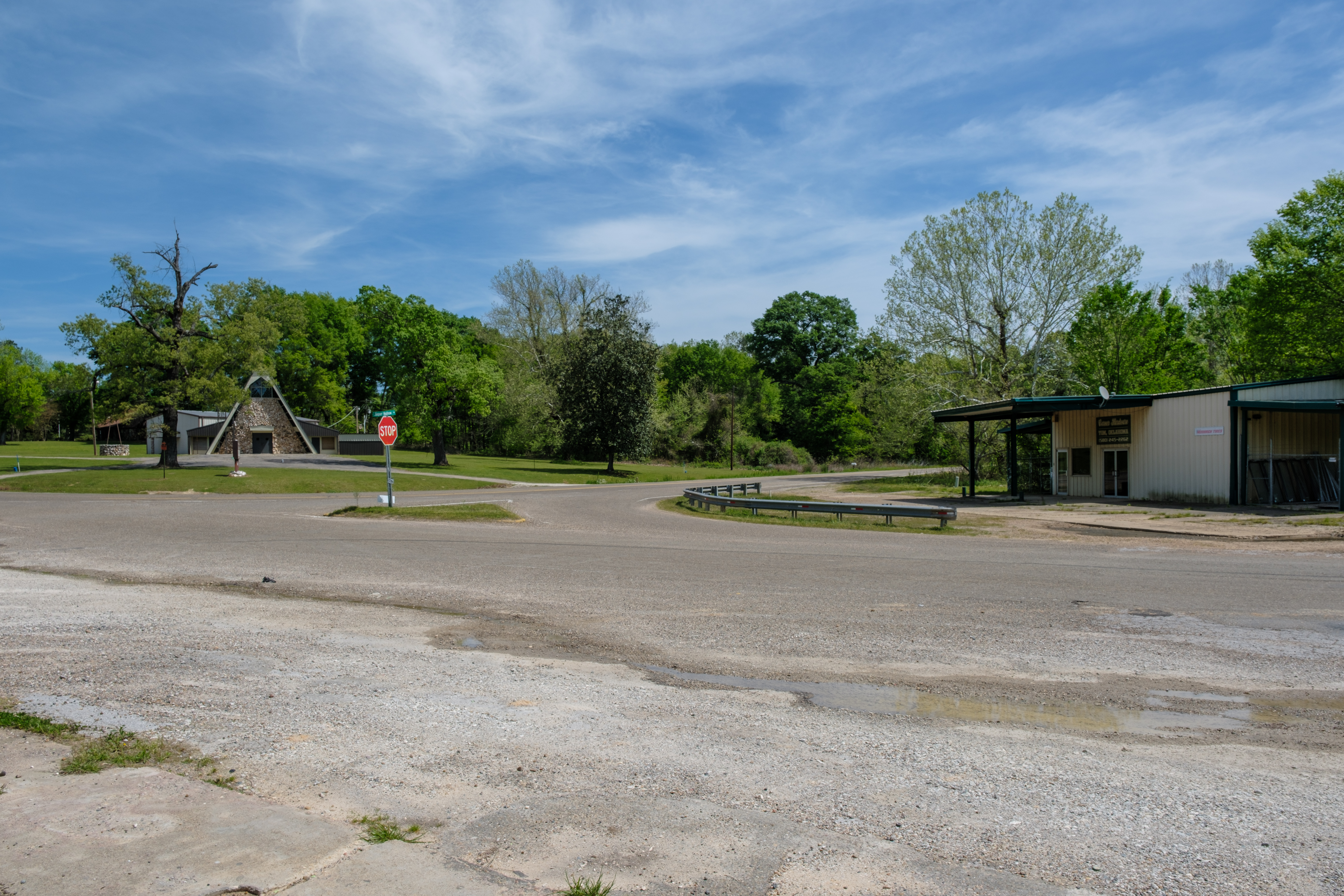

- Location within Oklahoma Location within the United States
- Coordinates: 33°44′09″N 94°34′23″W
- Country: United States
- State: Oklahoma
- County: McCurtain
- Elevation: 371 ft (113 m)
- Time zone: UTC-6 (Central (CST))
  - Summer (DST): UTC-5 (CDT)
- ZIP codes: 74740
- GNIS feature ID: 1101695

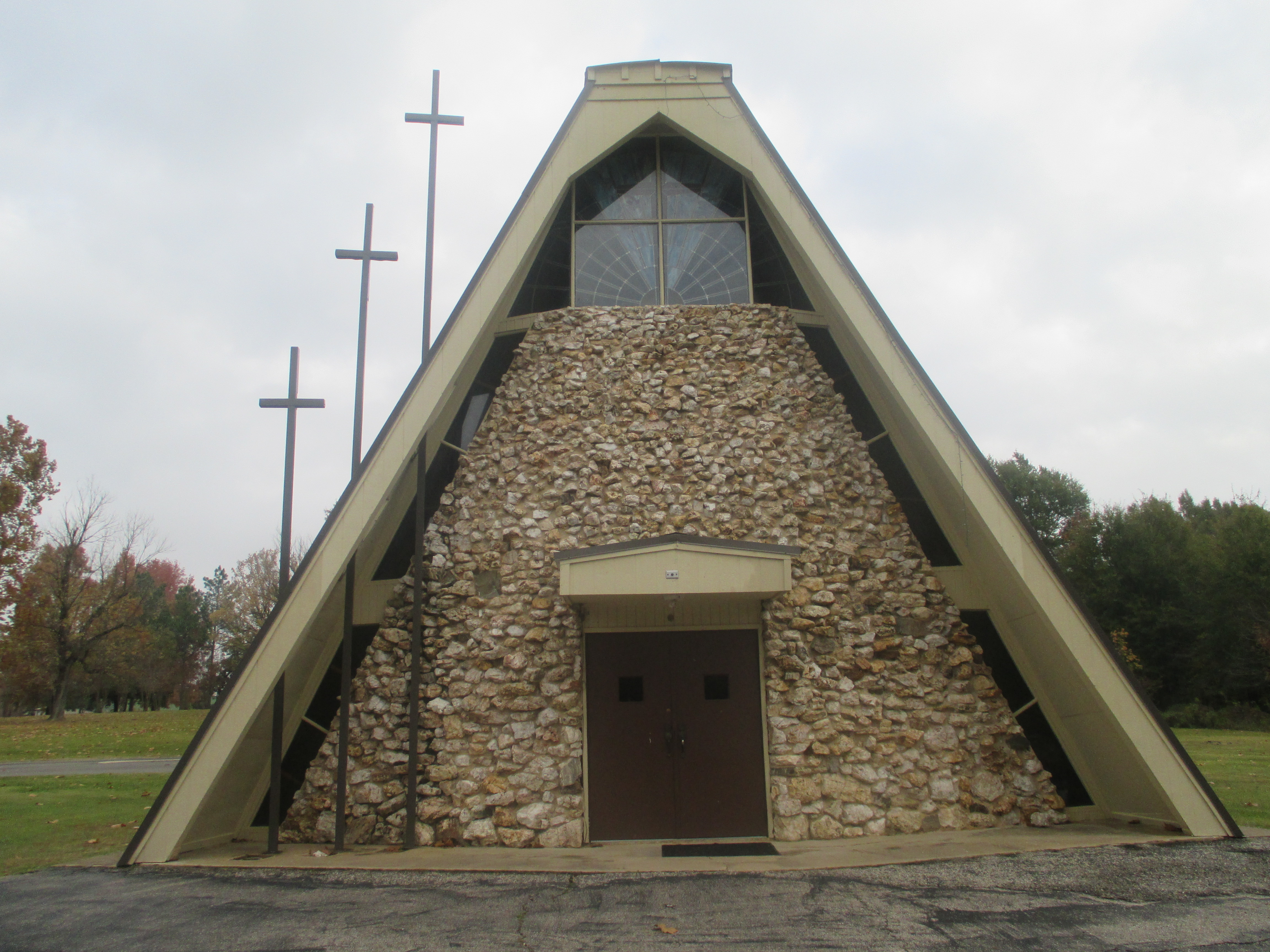
Tom Baptist Church is shaped in the form of an Indian tepee.

Tom is an unincorporated community in McCurtain County, Oklahoma, United States.

== History ==
The village was named for Tom Stewart, an early settler. A post office was established at Tom in 1916.
