= Little River (Red River tributary) =

River in Oklahoma and Arkansas, United States

Coordinates: 34.6081578°N 94.7946719°W

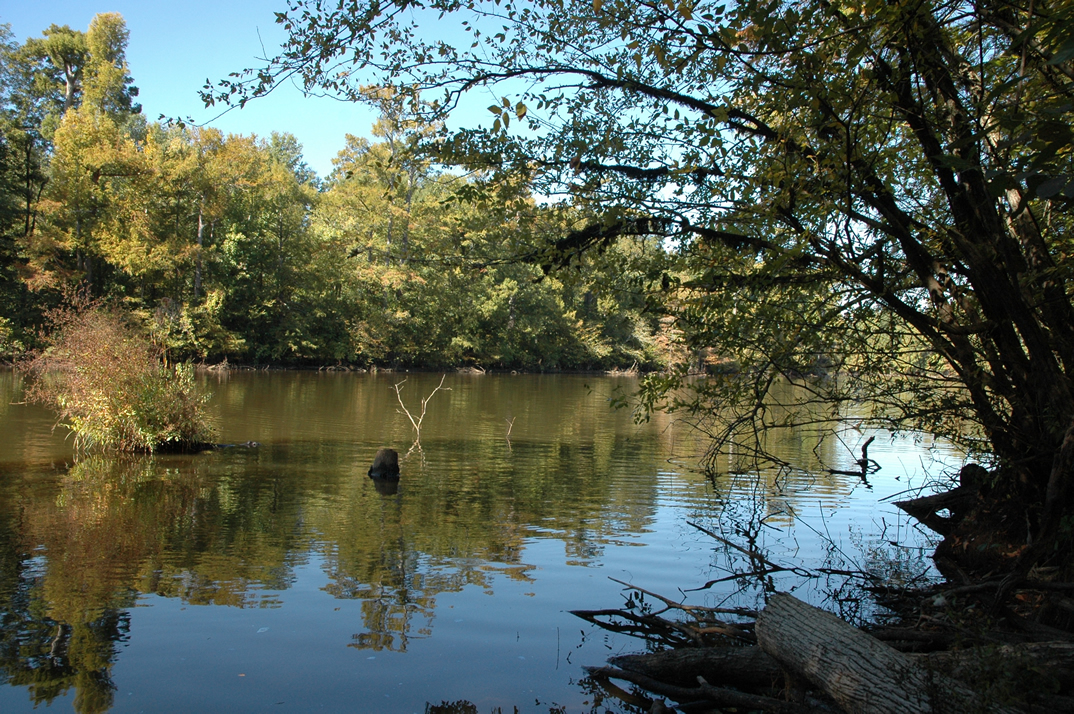
- The lower course of the Little River features swamps, Bald Cypress forests, and American alligators at the northwestern limit of their range.

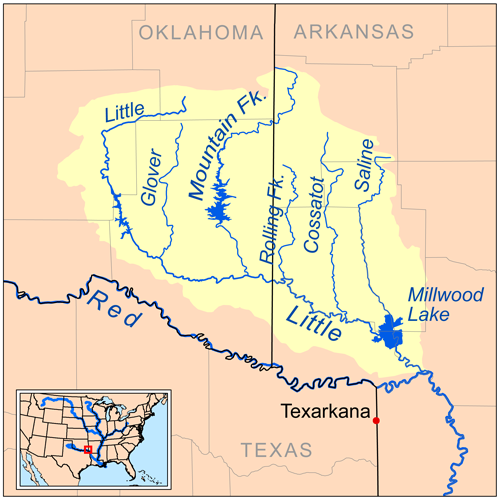
- Map of the Little River watershed
- Native name: Iskitinifalaya (Choctaw)

Location
- Country: United States
- States: Oklahoma, Arkansas

Physical characteristics
- Source
  - elevation: 70 m (230 ft)
- Mouth: Red River
- Length: 350 km (220 mi)
- Basin size: 10,889 km^{2} (4,204 sq mi)
- Discharge
  - location: Horatio, Arkansas
  - average: 4,084 cu/ft. per sec.

Basin features
- River system: Red River (Mississippi watershed)

The Little River is a tributary of the Red River, with a total length of 217 miles (349 km), 130 miles (210 km) within the Choctaw Indian Reservation in southeastern Oklahoma and 87 miles (140 km) in southwestern Arkansas in the United States. Via the Red, it is part of the watershed of the Mississippi River. Six large reservoirs impound the Little River and its tributaries. The drainage basin of the river totals 4,204 square miles (10,890 km^{2}), 2,204 square miles (5,710 km^{2}) in Oklahoma and 2,036 square miles (5,270 km^{2}) in Arkansas. The Little River and its upper tributaries are popular for recreational canoeing and kayaking.

== Course ==
The highest sources of the Little River are at an elevation of more than 2,000 feet (610 m) in southwestern Le Flore County, Oklahoma in the Ouachita Mountains. It initially flows westward into Pushmataha County, then south into McCurtain County where it turns to flow southeast, past Wright City and through the Little River National Wildlife Refuge and a portion of the Ouachita National Forest, into Arkansas, where it flows through or along the boundaries of Sevier, Little River and Hempstead counties, past the Pond Creek National Wildlife Refuge. It enters the Red River on the common boundary of Little River and Hempstead counties, about 1 mile (1.6 km) west of Fulton.

Principal tributaries of the Little River in Oklahoma include the Glover River and the Mountain Fork, both of which join it in McCurtain County. In Arkansas, it receives the Rolling Fork and the Cossatot River from the north in Sevier County; and the Saline River, which flows to Millwood Lake from the north on the boundary of Sevier and Howard counties.

Dams of the U.S. Army Corps of Engineers on the Little River create Pine Creek Lake 3,750 acres (1,520 ha) in Oklahoma and Millwood Lake 29,200 acres (11,800 ha) in Arkansas. Dams on tributaries create Broken Bow Lake 14,200 acres (5,700 ha) in Oklahoma and DeQueen Lake, 1,680 acres (680 ha); Gillham Lake, 1,370 acres (550 ha); and Dierks Lake, 1,360 acres (550 ha), in Arkansas.

Despite its modest length, the Little River is the sixth largest river in Oklahoma in terms of its flow which averages 3,275 cubic feet per second near the border with Arkansas. The Little River originates in the Ouachita mountains, the most humid part of Oklahoma receiving up to 60 inches (1,500 mm) of precipitation annually. There are no cities or towns on the Little River. Idabel, Oklahoma and DeQueen, Arkansas are near the river.

== Recreation and conservation ==
The Little River and its major tributaries are popular for canoeing and kayaking. The upper Little River from the hamlet of Honobia, Oklahoma to Pine Creek Lake, 46 river miles, has a moderate gradient and Class I and II rapids. At Pine Creek Lake the river issues from the highlands and thereafter flows through a low, swampy floodplain. The upper river may have insufficient water for boating from July to September except after rains. Water quality of the Little River is usually excellent with little residential or commercial development along its banks.

The Honobia Creek Wildlife Management Area (WMA) of 80,316 acres (32,503 ha) includes much of the upper course of the Little River within its boundaries. The WMA is a partnership between the government of Oklahoma and three timber companies. Most of the land is used for plantations of Loblolly Pine but hardwood forest is preserved in some areas. Twenty-one miles of the river flows through the WMA. Sport fishes include Flathead catfish, Largemouth and Smallmouth bass, Green sunfish, and Chain Pickerel. A fee is charged to access the WMA.

The Little River National Wildlife Refuge in Oklahoma and the Pond Creek National Wildlife Refuge in Arkansas protect portions of the lower Little River and provide habitat for a large variety of animals and plants. The 13,660 acres (5,530 ha) Little River NWR has the largest tree in Oklahoma, a Bald Cypress, within its boundaries and the largest specimens in Oklahoma of ten other tree species. Pond Creek NWR includes 30,500 acres (12,300 ha) on the north bank of the Little River. Breeding populations of the American alligator are found in Millood Lake and Pond Creek NWR and alligators are sometimes seen in the Little River National Wildlife Refuge. This lower section of the river is characterized by swamps, sloughs, oxbow lakes and a seasonally-flooded bottomland hardwood forest.

== See also ==
- List of Arkansas rivers
- List of Oklahoma rivers
- Little River National Wildlife Refuge
- Pond Creek National Wildlife Refuge
- Pine Creek Lake
- Millwood Lake
