= Gillham Lake =

- Location within Arkansas
- Location: Howard / Polk counties, Arkansas, United States
- Coordinates: 34°12′56″N 94°13′50″W
- Type: reservoir
- Primary inflows: Cossatot River
- Primary outflows: Cossatot River
- Basin countries: United States
- Max. depth: ca. 90 ft (27 m)
- Surface elevation: 502 feet (153 m)
- Islands: 4+

Gillham Lake is a small reservoir located along the Cossatot River, mostly in Howard County, but also extending westward into Polk County, Arkansas. The lake is 6 miles (9.7 km) from Gillham, Arkansas.

== Recreation ==
The Flood Control Act of 1958 approved the lake for construction. The lake provides flood control, water supply and wildlife conservation. Recreation was not planned for the lake purposes but they were included anyway. Gillham has five recreation areas, five boat ramps, three campgrounds, one picnic shelter, and one designated swim area. Gillham Lake includes 1,370 acres (6 km^{2}) of fishing; bass is mostly caught in the lake. Canoeing and fly fishing on the Cossatot River are popular. The river can be canoed about 16 miles (25.7 km) south of the dam to U.S. Highway 71 South. The Cossatot River has been noted as the best canoeing area between the Rocky Mountains and the Great Smoky Mountains. There are two designated picnicking areas and one picnicking shelter that are chiefly used for reunions and family recreation. Gillham Lake also has the Coon Creek Walking Trail which is located on the entry road to Big Coon Creek Park.

== Construction ==
Work on Gillham Dam began in June 1963, roads had to be relocated following the construction of the dam. The first concrete in the spillway was poured in November 1968. Work was halted in February 1971 but resumed in August 1972. The dam began storing water May 8, 1975.

== See also ==
- List of Arkansas dams and reservoirs
