= DeQueen Lake =

Reservoir in Arkansas, United States

- Location within Arkansas
- Location: Sevier County, Arkansas
- Coordinates: 34.1135°N 94.3890°W
- Type: reservoir
- Primary inflows: Rolling Fork River
- Primary outflows: Rolling Fork River
- Basin countries: United States

DeQueen Lake is a small reservoir along the Rolling Fork River in Sevier County, Arkansas. It is 4 miles (6 km) from DeQueen, Arkansas.

== DeQueen Dam ==
The Flood Control Act of 1958 approved the dam's construction. The construction was supervised by the Tulsa District of the United States Army Corps of Engineers. But now the dam is in control of the Little Rock District. Construction on the lake and dam was started in April 1966 and the lake went into operation August 31, 1977. The earthen dam is 160 feet (49 m) tall and compounds a reservoir with a maximum capacity of 370,600 acre-feet (460 million cubic meters).

== Recreation ==
The purposes of DeQueen Lake are flood control, water supply, wildlife conservation, and recreation. There are 3 campgrounds, 6 boat ramps, 3 swimming areas, many picnic areas, and 1 picnic shelter on DeQueen Lake. Fish species in the lake include largemouth bass, smallmouth bass, spotted bass, black and white crappie, channel and flathead catfish, and various species of sunfish. Picnicking areas are available at many of the sites on Dequeen Lake. There are many picnicking areas and 1 picnicking shelter. There are 3 swimming areas on DeQueen Lake.

== See also ==
- List of Arkansas dams and reservoirs
