= Oklahoma Open Meeting Act =

Oklahoma state law

Oklahoma State Legislature
- Full name: Oklahoma Open Meeting Act
- Signed into law: June 1, 1977
- Governor: David L. Boren
- Code: Title 25 (Definitions and General Provisions)
- Section: Sections 301–314
- Website: 25 O.S. Section 301

The Oklahoma Open Meeting Act (25 O.S. Sections 301–314) is an Oklahoma state law that requires that all meetings of public bodies (state and local boards and commissions) must be open to the public and that the public must be given advance public notice of such meetings. Such notice must include the specific time, place, and purpose of the meeting. Together with the Oklahoma Open Records Act, the Act serves to encourage the public to participate in and understand the governmental processes and governmental problems throughout the State.

The Oklahoma Open Meeting Act was signed into law by Governor David L. Boren on June 1, 1977.

== See also ==
- Freedom of Information Act (United States)
