= McCurtain County Wilderness Area =

Wilderness nature preserve in Oklahoma, US

- Location within Oklahoma
- Location: McCurtain County, Oklahoma
- Nearest city: Broken Bow
- Coordinates: 34°17′45″N 94°38′27″W
- Area: 14,087 acres (5,701 ha)
- Governing body: Oklahoma Department of Wildlife Conservation
- Website: www.wildlifedepartment.com/facts_maps/wma/mccurtain.htm

U.S. National Natural Landmark
- Designated: 1974

The McCurtain County Wilderness Area is a 14,087 acres (5,701 ha) wilderness nature preserve 25 miles (40 km) north of Broken Bow, Oklahoma. It has been owned by the Oklahoma Department of Wildlife Conservation. It was designated a National Natural Landmark in December 1974 for its excellent example of a xeric upland oak-pine forest.

== Description ==
The Area is in the southern section of the Ouachita Uplift and ranged from 575 feet (175 m) to 1,363 feet (415 m) in elevation. It receives 47.5 inches (121 cm) of rain annually, the highest amount in the state.

== Wildlife ==
There are over 110 bird species in the area, including the endangered red-cockaded woodpecker and bald eagle. It was nominated as an Important Bird Area in 2008 by the Audubon Society.

There are over 359 species of plants in the area.

== Visiting ==
There is a short 1 mile (1.6 km) nature trail, but further exploration of the east side of the reservoir requires advance permission.
