= Lake Georgia Pacific =

- Location within Arkansas
- Location: Ashley County, Arkansas, United States
- Coordinates: 33.2343°N 92.0344°W
- Type: reservoir
- Basin countries: United States
- Average depth: 8 ft (2.4 m)

Lake Georgia Pacific is a small reservoir in South Arkansas. It is formed by Lake Georgia Pacific Dam, and located a few miles from Lake Jack Lee, and 10 miles from Crossett, Arkansas.

Lake Georgia Pacific is named after the Georgia Pacific Corporation, that owns a mill in Crossett. There are 10 recreational campsites, in which you can go camping, picnicking, or fishing. Lake Georgia Pacific has an average depth of eight feet.

In 1964, Lake Georgia Pacific was designated a Migratory Waterflow Refuge. National Audubon Society groups visit the lake mainly to view the Bald Eagles that nest near here. The Audubon Society has recognized at least 164 species of birds, in which two species are considered rare.

== See also ==
- List of Arkansas dams and reservoirs
