= Little River National Wildlife Refuge =

National Wildlife Refuge in McCurtain County, Oklahoma

- IUCN category IV (habitat/species management area)
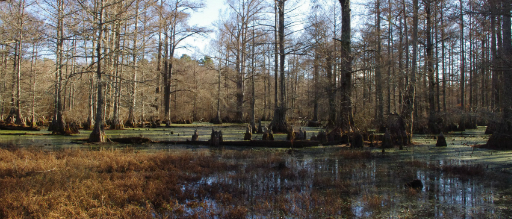

- Location within the United States
- Location: McCurtain County, Oklahoma, United States
- Nearest city: Idabel, Oklahoma
- Coordinates: 33°56′47″N 94°46′21″W
- Area: 15,000 acres (61 km^{2})
- Established: 1987
- Governing body: U.S. Fish and Wildlife Service
- Website: Little River National Wildlife Refuge

The Little River National Wildlife Refuge is a National Wildlife Refuge of the United States located in Oklahoma. It covers 15,000 acres (61 km^{2}) of forests and wetlands.

The refuge contains most of the remaining bottomland hardwood communities in the southeastern part of the state. It is characterized by low, wet oak and hickory forest with oxbows and sloughs. Trees of the landscape include hickory, willow oak, sweetgum, cypress, white oak, loblolly pine, and walnut.

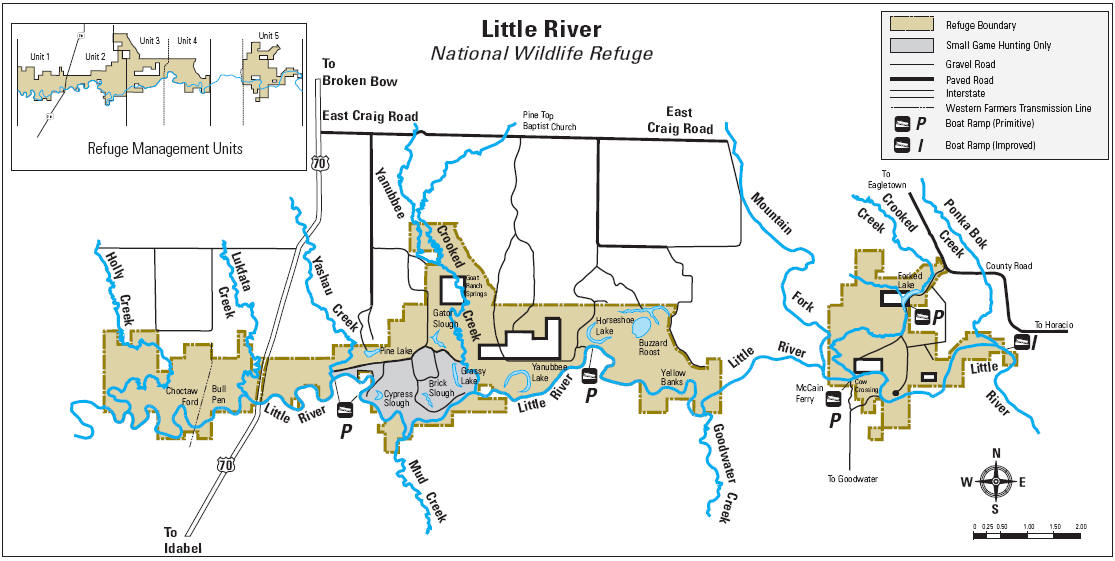
A map of the Little River National Wildlife Refuge.
