= McCurtain County, Oklahoma =

County in Oklahoma, United States

- County
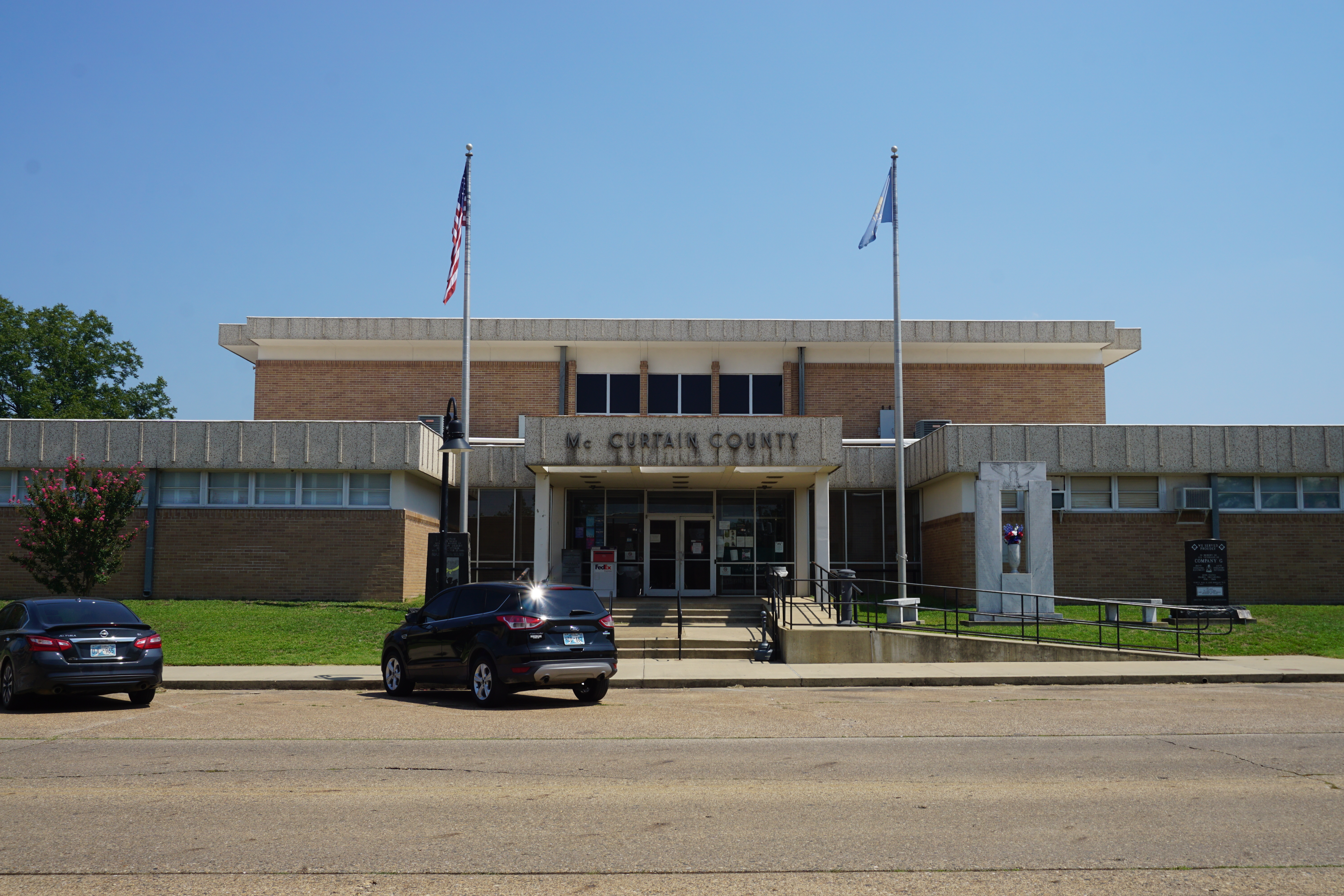
- The McCurtain County Courthouse is located downtown in Idabel.

- Location within the U.S. state of Oklahoma
- Coordinates: 34.11°N 94.77°W
- Country: United States
- State: Oklahoma
- Founded: 1907
- Named for: An influential Choctaw Indian family
- Seat: Idabel
- Largest city: Idabel

Area
  - Total: 1,902 sq mi (4,930 km^{2})
  - Land: 1,850 sq mi (4,800 km^{2})
  - Water: 52 sq mi (130 km^{2}) 2.8%

Population (2020)
  - Total: 30,814
  - Estimate (2025): 30,744 ▼
  - Density: 16.6/sq mi (6.4/km^{2})
- Congressional district: 2nd
- Website: mccurtain.okcounties.org

McCurtain County is a county in the southeastern corner of the U.S. state of Oklahoma. As of the 2020 census, its population was 30,814. Its county seat is Idabel. It was formed at statehood from part of the earlier Choctaw Nation in Indian Territory. The name honors an influential Choctaw family who lived in the area. Jackson McCurtain and Edmund McCurtain served in the Confederate Army before their terms as chief, while Green McCurtain was the last chief when Oklahoma became a state in 1907.

== History ==
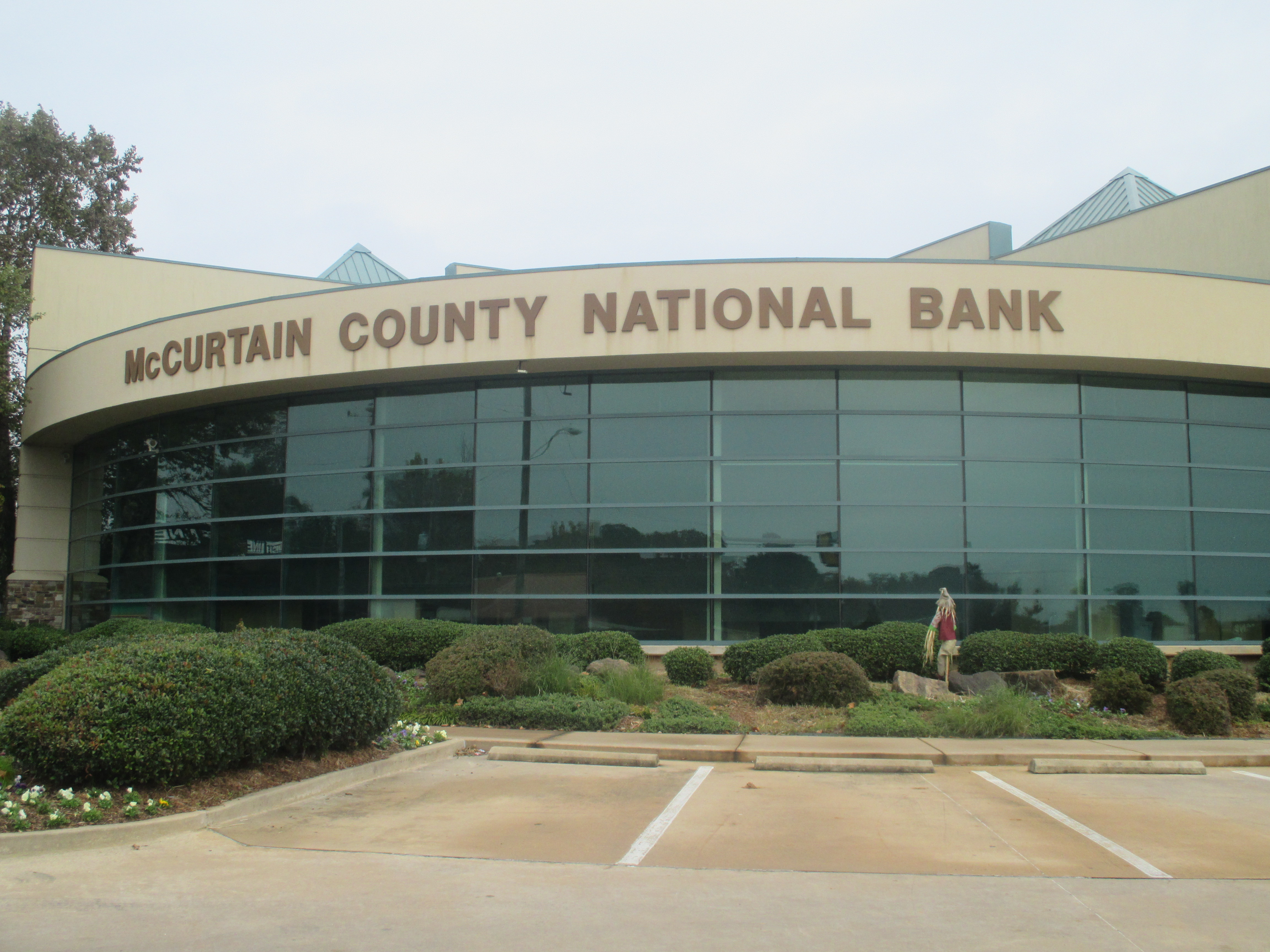
McCurtain County National Bank in Broken Bow, Oklahoma

The area now included in McCurtain County was part of the Choctaw Nation before Oklahoma became a state. The territory of the present-day county fell within the Apukshunnubbee District, one of three administrative superregions comprising the Choctaw Nation, and was divided among six of its counties: Bok Tuklo, Cedar, Eagle, Nashoba, Red River, and Towson. In the 1820s, it was a major part of Miller County, Arkansas Territory.

The area was sparsely populated, with no roads or bridges and no towns. Post offices were established at small trading posts along the various trails. Towns began to form when the Arkansas and Choctaw Railway (later the St. Louis and San Francisco Railway) was built across the area in 1902. Between 1910 and 1921, the Choctaw Lumber Company laid tracks for the Texas, Oklahoma and Eastern Railroad from Valliant, Oklahoma, to DeQueen, Arkansas. These roads still served the area at the beginning of the 21st century.

Initially, the county experienced difficulty functioning because of lack of funds. When the Choctaws accepted their land allotments, their homesteads were not taxable for 21 years. No roads were built until a decade after statehood. With no bridges, ferries carried people and vehicles across the major streams.

Beavers Bend State Park was opened in 1937, establishing the region as a tourism destination due to the variety of recreational activities it offers.

On April 2, 1982, the county was struck by an F5 tornado.

=== Death of Henry Lee Johnson ===
Henry Lee Johnson was a 15-year-old boy who was murdered in 1980 in Idabel after entering the parking lot of the Black Hat Club, a "whites-only club". His murder resulted in a riot in Idabel that left two more men dead.

=== 2023 audio recording scandal ===
In April 2023, the McCurtain Gazette-News released audio recordings of discussions among local officials about hiring a hit man to murder the paper's publisher and a reporter, Chris Willingham, and lamenting that lynching Black people was no longer acceptable. Oklahoma Governor Kevin Stitt said that he was "both appalled and disheartened to hear of the horrid comments made by officials in McCurtain County". Stitt called for the local officials to resign, including "McCurtain County Sheriff Kevin Clardy, District 2 Commissioner Mark Jennings, Investigator Alicia Manning, and Jail Administrator Larry Hendrix." Over 100 people gathered outside the county courthouse calling on the officials to resign.

In response, the McCurtain County Sheriff's Office released a statement on Facebook reading:

There is and has been an ongoing investigation into multiple, significant violation of the Oklahoma Security of Communications Act ... which states that it is illegal to secretly record a conversation ... Many of these recordings, like the one published by media outlets on Friday, have yet to be duly authenticated or validated. Our preliminary information indicates that the media-released audio recording has, in fact, been altered. ... In addition to being illegally obtained, the audio does not match the "transcription" of that audio, and is not precisely consistent with what has been put into print. Multiple agencies are assisting in this ongoing investigation. ... There will be continued press releases from this agency as the investigation comes to a close and findings are forwarded to the appropriate authorities for felony charges to be filed on those involved.

Jennings resigned on April 19. The Oklahoma State Bureau of Investigation is investigating the incident. Willingham also filed a federal lawsuit alleging that Manning "told a third party during a teleconference that Chris Willingham exchanged marijuana for sexually explicit images of children from a man who had been arrested on child sex-abuse image charges".

On June 18, 2024, Clardy lost his bid for reelection, placing third in the Republican primary with 18.26% of the vote.

A documentary film about the scandal, Kill. Bury. Print., was released in 2026.

== Geography ==
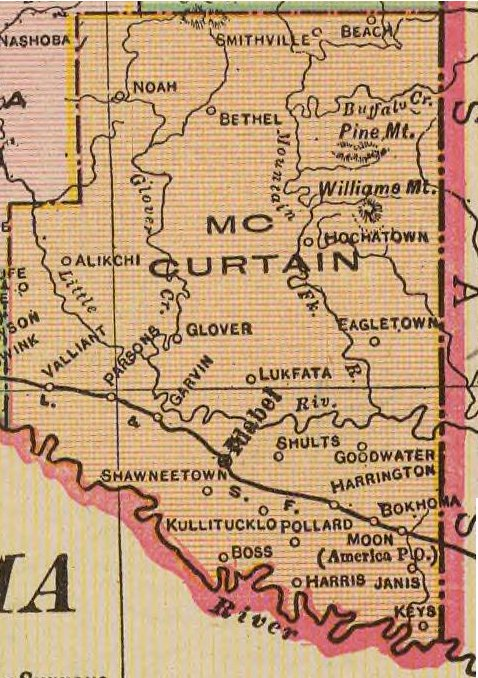
Map of McCurtain County, 1909

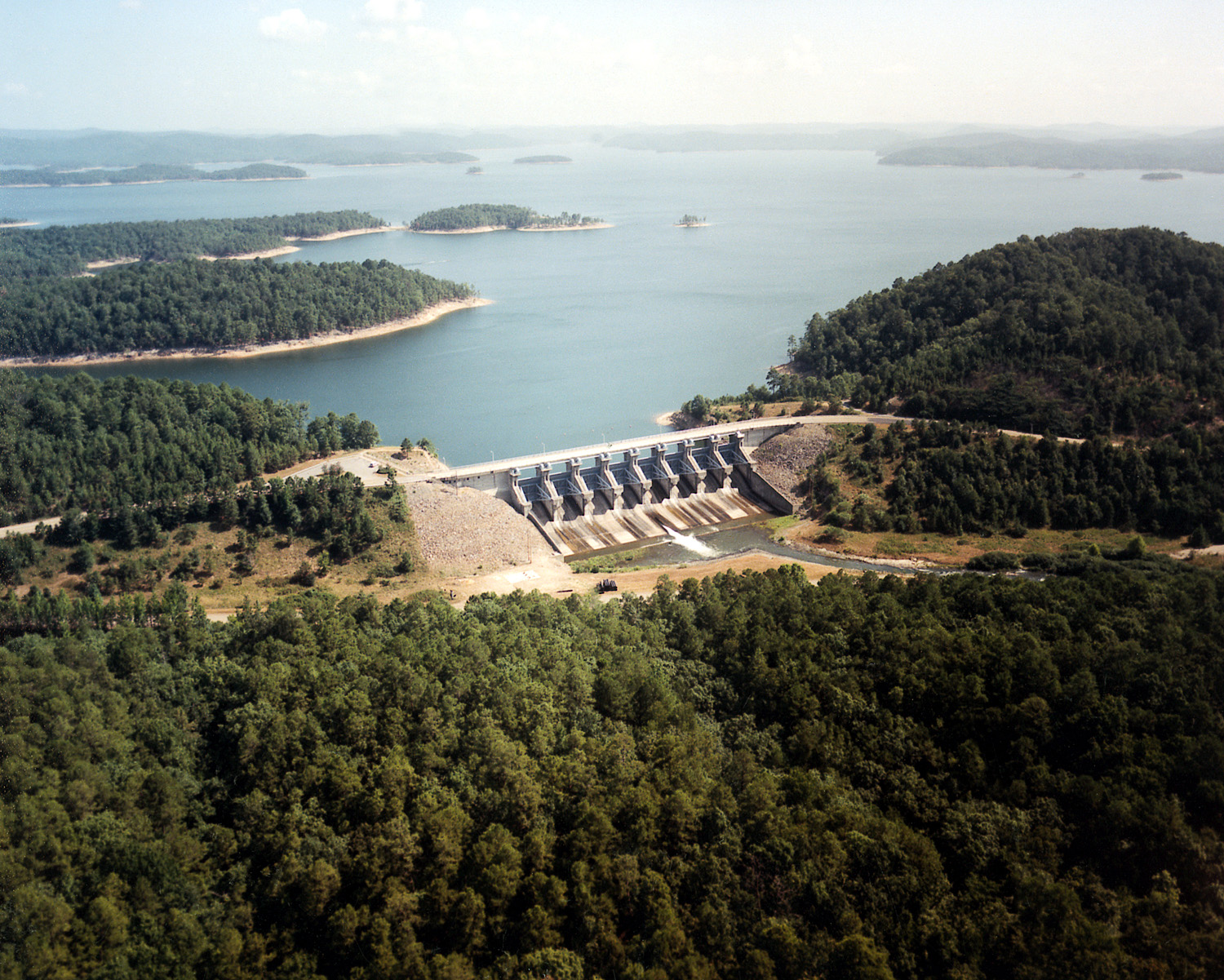
Spillway at Broken Bow Lake

McCurtain County's location in southeastern Oklahoma places it within a 10-county area designated for tourism purposes by the Oklahoma Department of Tourism and Recreation as Choctaw Country. According to the U.S. Census Bureau, the county has an area of 1,902 square miles (4,930 km^{2}), of which 52 square miles (130 km^{2}) (2.8%) are covered by water.

It is the third-largest county in Oklahoma by area. The terrain of McCurtain County varies from the foothills of the Ouachita Mountains in the northern part of the county to the rich Red River bottoms of the southern part. Sections of the Mountain Fork and Little River drainages lie in McCurtain County. The Glover River originates in McCurtain County and flows 33.2 miles (53.4 km) to its confluence with the Little River southeast of Wright City. Broken Bow Lake was created in 1968 by damming the Mountain Fork River; the river is one of the state's two year-round trout fisheries. The lowest point in the state of Oklahoma is on the Little River in McCurtain County, where it flows out of Oklahoma and into Arkansas. McCurtain County is the only documented part of Oklahoma, together with Choctaw County, within the natural range of the American alligator.

The county also contains the McCurtain County Wilderness Area, a 14,087-acre tract created in 1918 and managed by the Oklahoma Department of Wildlife Conservation, and the Little River National Wildlife Refuge, which is managed by the U.S. Fish and Wildlife Service.

The county contains the location (Smithville) with the highest annual average precipitation in the state, at 55.71 inches.

=== Major highways ===
- U.S. Highway 70
- U.S. Highway 259
- State Highway 3
- State Highway 4
- State Highway 37
- State Highway 87
- State Highway 98

=== Adjacent counties ===
- Le Flore County (north)
- Polk County, Arkansas (northeast)
- Sevier County, Arkansas (east)
- Little River County, Arkansas (southeast)
- Bowie County, Texas (south)
- Red River County, Texas (southwest)
- Choctaw County (west)
- Pushmataha County (northwest)

=== National protected areas ===
- Little River National Wildlife Refuge
- Ouachita National Forest (part)

== Demographics ==
Historical population
Census	Pop.	Note	%±
1910	20,681		—
1920	37,905		83.3%
1930	34,759		−8.3%
1940	41,318		18.9%
1950	31,588		−23.5%
1960	25,851		−18.2%
1970	28,642		10.8%
1980	36,151		26.2%
1990	33,433		−7.5%
2000	34,402		2.9%
2010	33,151		−3.6%
2020	30,814		−7.0%
2025 (est.)	30,744	▼	−0.2%
U.S. Decennial Census; 1790–1960 1900–1990; 1990–2000 2010–2019

=== 2020 census ===
As of the 2020 census, the county had a population of 30,814. Of the residents, 25.2% were under the age of 18 and 18.9% were 65 years of age or older; the median age was 39.7 years. For every 100 females there were 94.8 males, and for every 100 females age 18 and over there were 91.2 males.

The racial makeup of the county was 60.0% White, 8.3% Black or African American, 14.7% American Indian and Alaska Native, 0.4% Asian, 2.8% from some other race, and 12.3% from two or more races. Hispanic or Latino residents of any race comprised 6.1% of the population.

There were 12,009 households in the county, of which 32.4% had children under the age of 18 living with them and 29.7% had a female householder with no spouse or partner present. About 27.8% of all households were made up of individuals and 13.0% had someone living alone who was 65 years of age or older.

There were 13,888 housing units, of which 13.5% were vacant. Among occupied housing units, 69.5% were owner-occupied and 30.5% were renter-occupied. The homeowner vacancy rate was 1.4% and the rental vacancy rate was 9.4%.

=== 2000 census ===
At the 2000 census, 34,402 people, 13,216 households, and 9,541 families lived in the county. The population density was 7/km^{2} (18/mi^{2}). The 15,427 housing units had an average density of 3/km^{2} (7.8/mi^{2}). The racial makup of the county was 70.54% White, 13.57% Native American, 9.30% Black or African American, 0.22% Asian, 0.01% Pacific Islander, 1.34% from other races, and 5.02% from two or more races; 3.09% were Hispanic or Latino of any race, while 28.6% were of American, 7.6% Irish, and 5.9% English ancestry. Of the inhabitants, 94.4% spoke English, 2.9% Spanish, and 2.6% Choctaw as their first language.

Of the 13,216 households, 34.0% had children under 18 living with them, 53.3% were married couples living together, 14.6% had a female householder with no husband present, and 27.8% were not families. Of households, 25.4% were one person and 11.0% were one person 65 or older. The average household size was 2.56 and the average family size was 3.06.

The age distribution was 28.2% under 18, 8.3% from 18 to 24, 26.2% from 25 to 44, 23.4% from 45 to 64, and 14.0% 65 or older. The median age was 36 years. For every 100 females, there were 92.80 males. For every 100 females age 18 and over, there were 89.10 males.

The median household income was $24,162 and the median family income was $29,933. Males had a median income of $26,528 versus $17,869 for females. The per capita income for the county was $13,693. About 21.0% of families and 24.7% of the population were below the poverty line, including 32.4% of those under 18 and 21.2% of those 65 or over.

== Politics ==
United States presidential election results for McCurtain County, Oklahoma
Year	Republican		Democratic		Third party(ies)	
Year	No.	%	No.	%	No.	%
1908	482	40.33%	565	47.28%	148	12.38%
1912	704	27.07%	1,059	40.72%	838	32.22%
1916	795	24.75%	1,763	54.89%	654	20.36%
1920	1,966	40.23%	2,603	53.26%	318	6.51%
1924	1,669	32.19%	3,279	63.24%	237	4.57%
1928	1,915	39.79%	2,877	59.78%	21	0.44%
1932	587	9.07%	5,886	90.93%	0	0.00%
1936	1,119	17.99%	5,089	81.80%	13	0.21%
1940	2,225	24.06%	6,994	75.63%	29	0.31%
1944	1,419	21.02%	5,322	78.83%	10	0.15%
1948	1,091	14.92%	6,223	85.08%	0	0.00%
1952	2,748	32.17%	5,793	67.83%	0	0.00%
1956	2,707	36.25%	4,761	63.75%	0	0.00%
1960	3,562	45.88%	4,202	54.12%	0	0.00%
1964	2,981	33.26%	5,982	66.74%	0	0.00%
1968	2,795	32.43%	2,944	34.16%	2,880	33.41%
1972	6,441	70.20%	2,568	27.99%	166	1.81%
1976	3,423	30.89%	7,560	68.23%	97	0.88%
1980	5,189	45.63%	5,953	52.35%	230	2.02%
1984	6,381	61.26%	3,994	38.34%	41	0.39%
1988	4,920	49.64%	4,928	49.72%	63	0.64%
1992	3,519	30.62%	5,082	44.21%	2,893	25.17%
1996	3,892	39.82%	4,350	44.51%	1,532	15.67%
2000	6,601	62.97%	3,752	35.79%	129	1.23%
2004	7,472	66.98%	3,684	33.02%	0	0.00%
2008	7,745	73.49%	2,794	26.51%	0	0.00%
2012	7,635	75.78%	2,440	24.22%	0	0.00%
2016	8,656	80.70%	1,802	16.80%	268	2.50%
2020	9,485	82.72%	1,858	16.20%	124	1.08%
2024	9,485	83.87%	1,696	15.00%	128	1.13%

McCurtain County is home to a significant Native American population and had a Democratic registration advantage well into the 2010s, but has not voted for a Democratic presidential nominee in the 21st century. The rightward shift has continued to increase, with the vote shares of Republican presidential nominees increasing in every election since 2000, winning well over 70% of the vote during the Obama era and topping out with 83.8% for Donald Trump in 2024.

Voter registration and party enrolment as of January August 31, 2023
Party	Number of voters	Percentage
Republican	8,953	54.46%
Democratic	5,491	33.40%
Independent	1,913	11.64%
Libertarian	83	0.50%
Total	16,440	100%

== Economy ==
Agriculture and forestry have dominated the county's economy. The dense forests that originally covered the area were cleared and processed within two decades after statehood. The cleared lands then became subsistence farms. Cotton was the main money crop, until the cotton market collapsed during the Great Depression. Cattle raising, as well as production of swine and poultry, replaced cotton farming in importance. Cotton farms in the Red River Valley began raising grains and forage, instead.

Natural reseeding and active reforestation projects, both public and private, have replenished much of the harvested forest area. This revitalized the timber industry, which is again important to the county economy. Limestone, sand and gravel are extracted for extensive local use.

== Communities ==
=== Cities ===
- Broken Bow
- Idabel (county seat)

=== Towns ===
- Garvin
- Haworth
- Hochatown
- Millerton
- Smithville
- Valliant
- Wright City

=== Census-designated place ===
- Eagletown
- Golden

=== Other unincorporated communities ===
- Battiest
- Bethel
- Bokhoma
- Clebit
- Glover
- Pickens
- Ringold
- Rufe
- Sherwood
- Tom
- Watson

== Education ==
K-12 school districts include:

- Battiest Public Schools
- Broken Bow Public Schools
- Eagletown Public Schools
- Haworth Public Schools
- Idabel Public Schools
- Smithville Public Schools
- Valliant Public Schools
- Wright City Public Schools

Elementary school districts include:

- Denison Public School
- Forest Grove Public School
- Glover Public School
- Holly Creek Public School
- Lukfata Public School

There was formerly a Watson Public School school district. In 2010 the district ceased operations and consolidated into Smithville Public Schools.

== Notable people ==
- Harry Rossoll, creator of Smokey Bear and artist for the Forest Heritage Center diorama exhibits

== See also ==
- List of U.S. counties named after prominent Confederate historical figures
- National Register of Historic Places listings in McCurtain County, Oklahoma
