= Seven Devils Lake =

US reservoir

- Location within Arkansas
- Location: Drew County, South Arkansas
- Coordinates: 33.5537°N 91.5748°W
- Basin countries: United States

Seven Devils Lake is a small reservoir in South Arkansas, It is located about 14 miles (23 km) out of Monticello, Arkansas. The Lake is formed by Seven Devils Dam. The area got its name after a man that was trapped in the area for days finally made it out, a reporter asked if he found the rumored seven lakes of the area, the man then stated that there was not any seven lakes, but seven devils. This area is to be the most northern point west of the Mississippi River where American alligators can be found.

Seven Devils Swamp Wildlife Management Area is also located near the lake. The project includes 3,445 acres (14 km^{2}) of wetlands, cypress forest, and timberlands. The project was made to protect the remains of the wetlands that have been draining for the past 100 years. The area is mainly controlled by the Arkansas Game and Fish Commission. Seven Devils Swamp WMA provides the benefit of migration, breeding, and public hunting.

== See also ==
List of Arkansas dams and reservoirs
