= Bethel, McCurtain County, Oklahoma =

Bethel, Oklahoma
- Unincorporated community
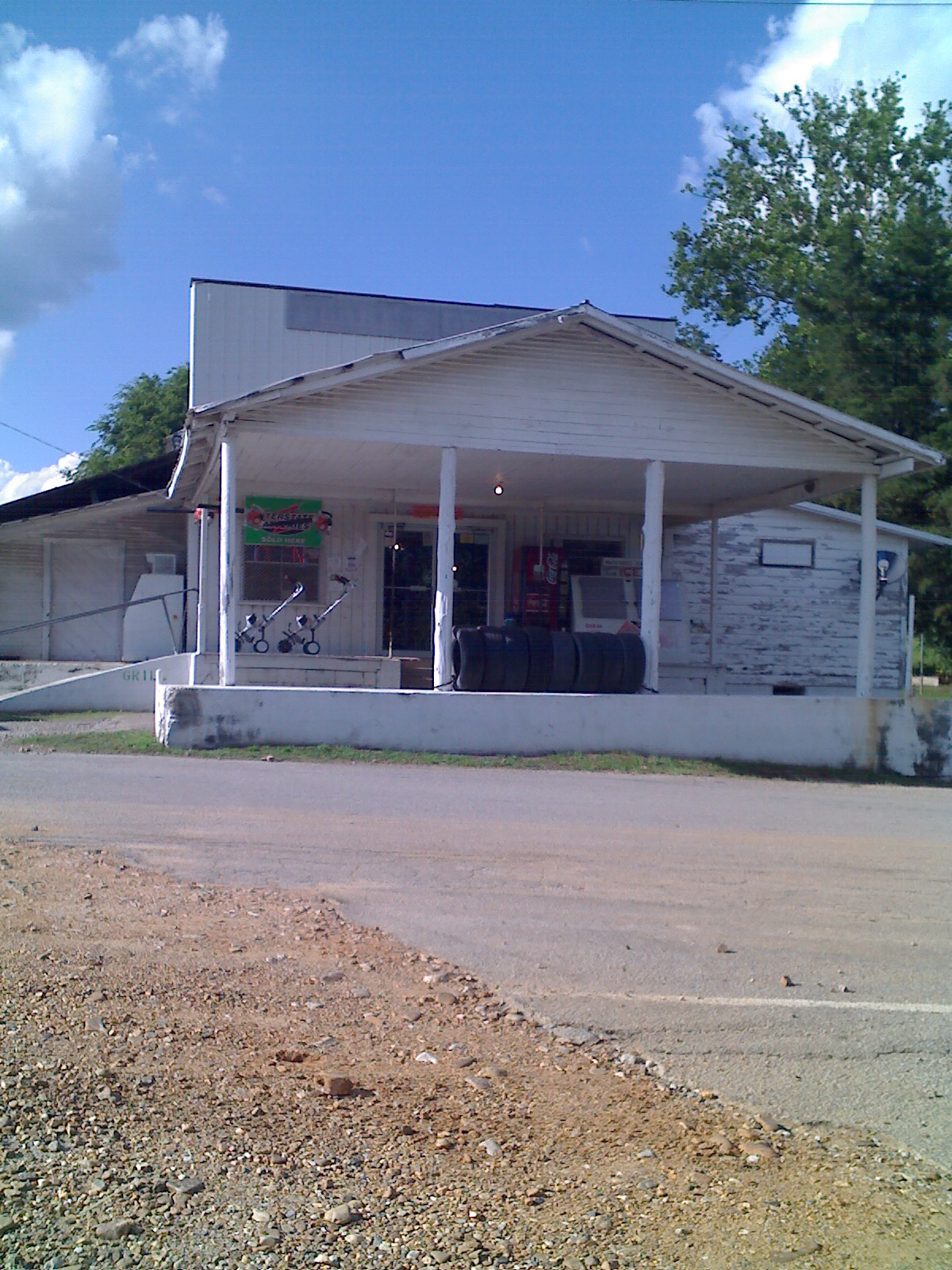
- Blake's Grocery & Feed in the original building built in 1923. Picture taken in July 2009.

- Location within Oklahoma Location within the United States
- Coordinates: 34°21′36.88″N 94°50′14.71″W
- Country: United States
- State: Oklahoma
- County: McCurtain
- Time zone: UTC-6 (Central (CST))
  - Summer (DST): UTC-5 (CDT)
- ZIP codes: 74724

Bethel is a rural unincorporated community located in McCurtain County, Oklahoma, United States. It is situated about 25 miles north of Broken Bow, and about 37 miles north of Idabel, off US Route 259 on Bethel Cutoff Rd. The post office was opened January 24, 1900. The locale was named after the "Bethel" in Palestine, the word being Hebrew for "house of God".

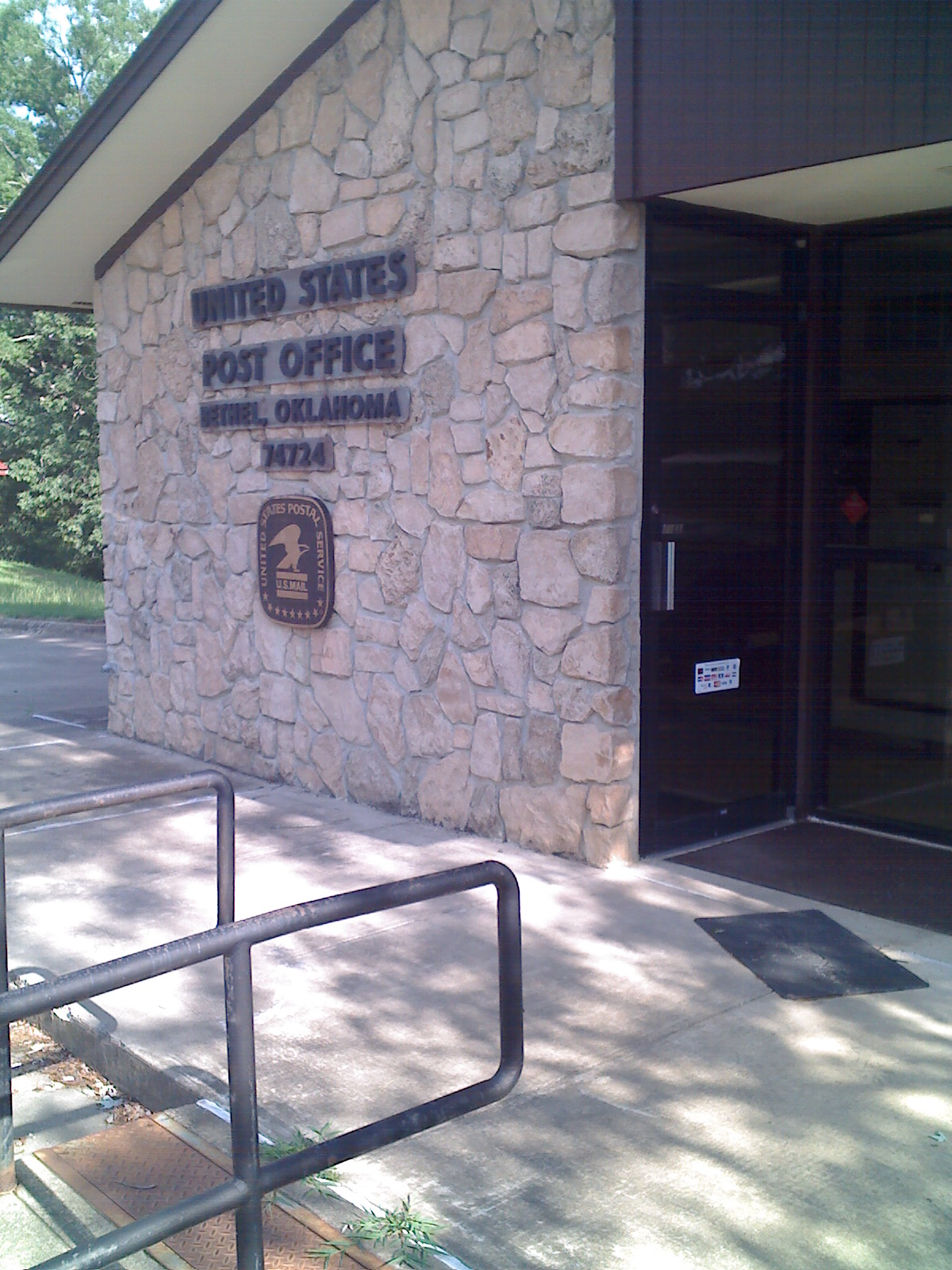
Bethel Post Office on 7/21/2009.

McCurtain County Game Reserve, along with Beavers Bend State Park and Nature Center, are southeast of town. Historic Bethel Cemetery is northwest of town center.

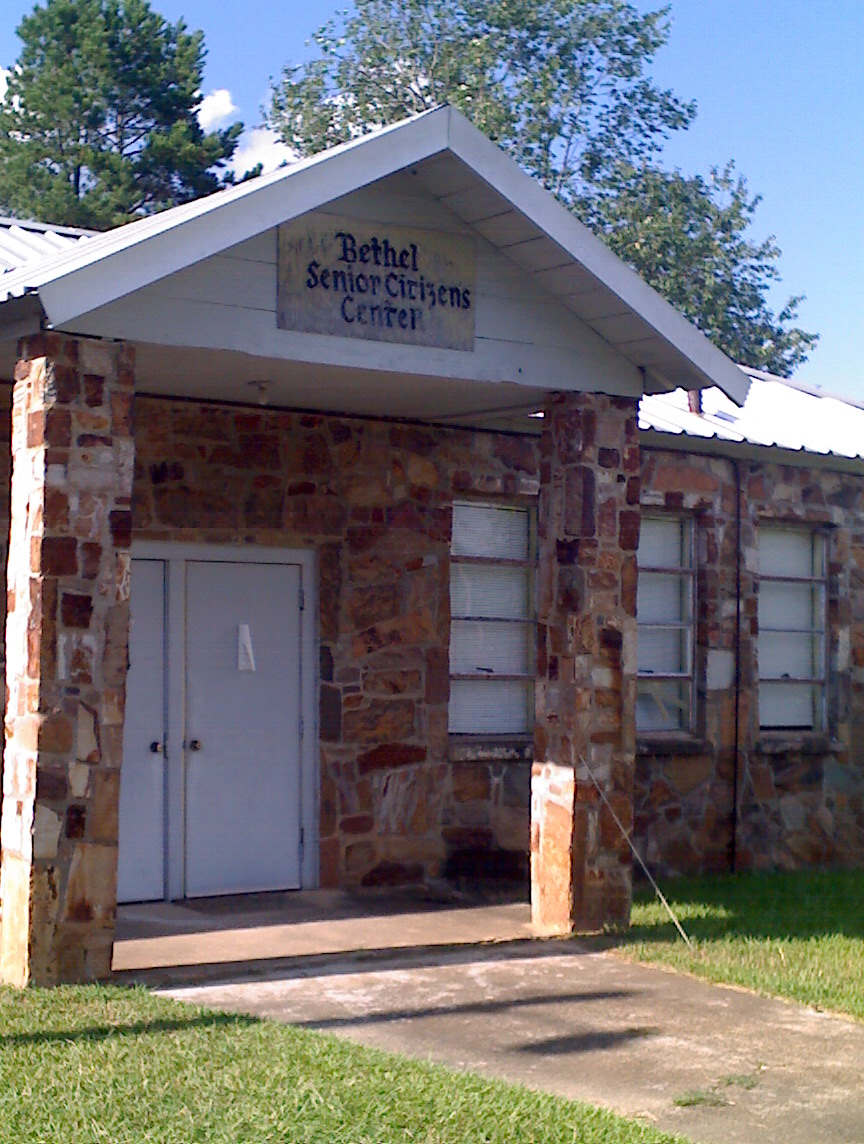
Bethel Senior Citizens' Center in July 2009, used as a polling place

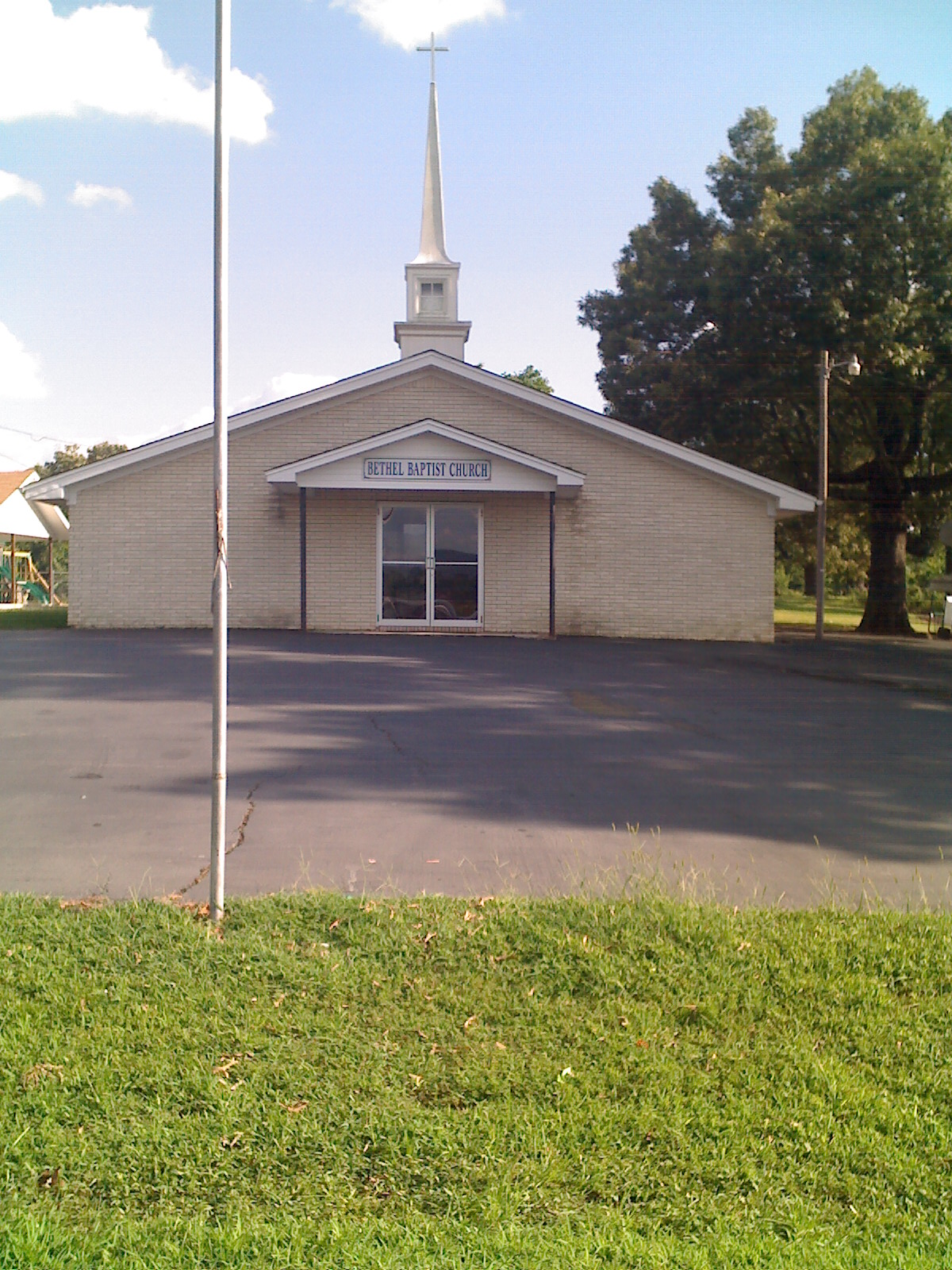
Bethel Missionary Baptist Church in July 2009
