= Cossatot River =

River in Arkansas, United States

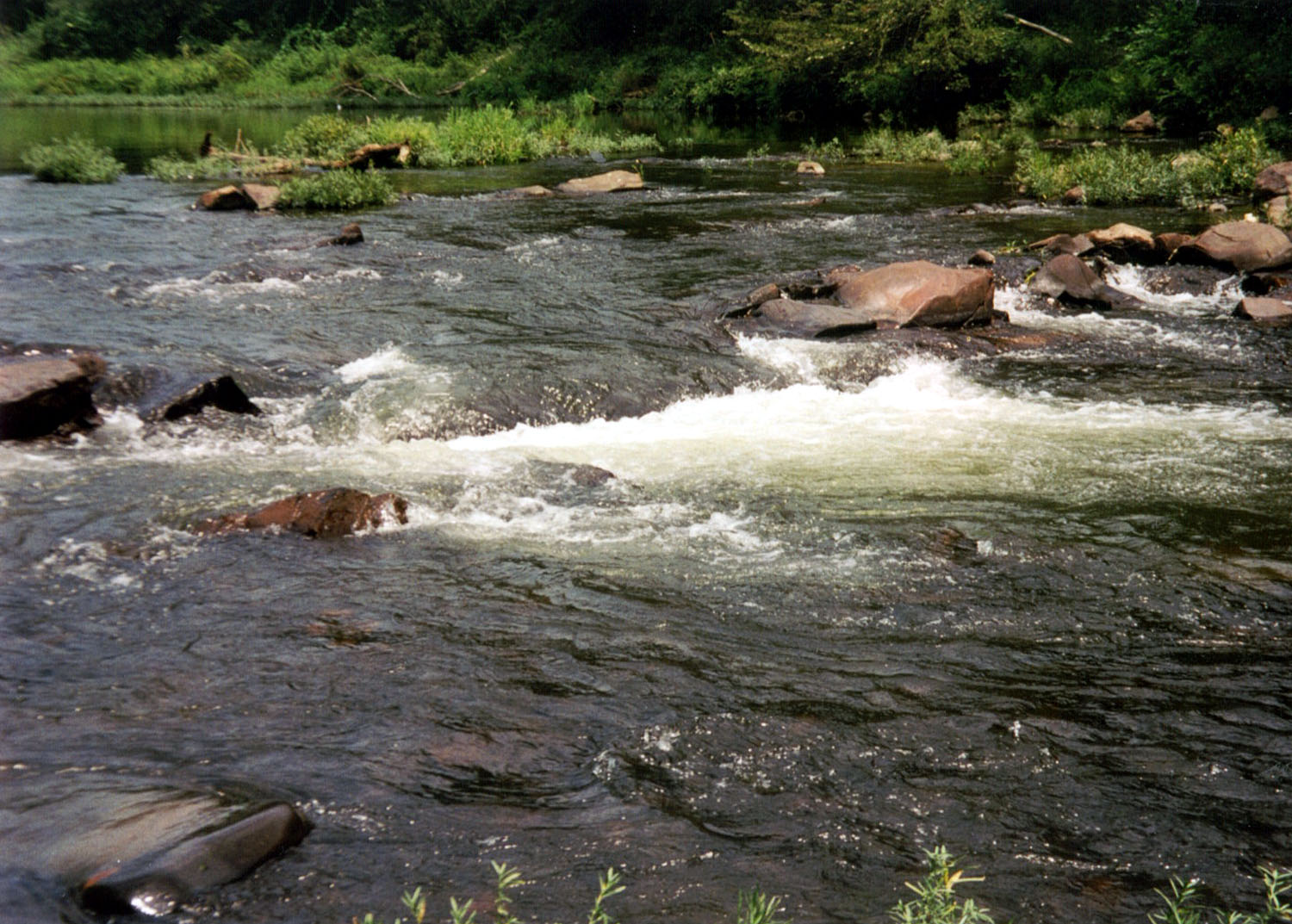
- The Cossatot River near Gillham Lake in Howard County, Arkansas

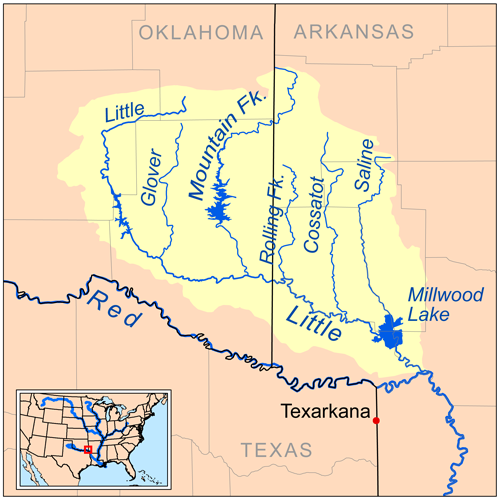
- The Little River watershed

Physical characteristics
- Source
  - location: Ouachita Mountains
  - coordinates: 34°28′52″N 94°11′37″W
- Mouth
  - location: Gillham Lake, Howard County, Arkansas
  - coordinates: 33°47′28″N 94°09′15″W
- Discharge
  - location: DeQueen, Arkansas
  - average: 638 cu/ft. per sec.

National Wild and Scenic River
- Type: Scenic, Recreational
- Designated: April 22, 1992

The Cossatot River is an 89-mile-long (143 km) river in Howard, Polk and Sevier counties in the U.S. state of Arkansas.

The Cossatot begins in the Ouachita Mountains southeast of Mena, Arkansas. The river flows through the Ouachita National Forest and then in a generally southerly direction until it empties into Gillham Lake. After exiting Gillham Lake the river becomes leisurely until it joins with the Little River at the site where it empties into Millwood Lake.

Cossatot comes from an Indian term which translates roughly to skull crusher. The Cossatot is known as a difficult (class II - IV+) whitewater stream to canoeists and kayakers and a section at Cossatot Falls in Howard County, Arkansas has been called "the most challenging section of whitewater between the Smokies and the Rockies," though there are many more challenging runs in the state of Arkansas, such as Richland Creek, Crooked Creek or the Upper Buffalo (Hailstone run). An 11-mile (18-km) section including Cossatot Falls is designated as the Cossatot River State Park-Natural Area. Cossatot Falls is a series of back-to-back class III-IV+ rapids that drops around 40 feet in 1/8 of a mile. Rapid names are Cossatosser (class II+), Eye Opener, B.M.F. (class III), Washing Machine (class IV+), Whiplash, (class III+), and Shoulderbone (class II), with Deer Camp Rapid (class III), Devil's Hollow Rapid (class III+), and Devil's Hollow Falls (class IV) located downstream of the Falls area. Zigzag (Class III) and the Esses (class III) are other notable rapids on the Cossatot, located above the Falls. Whitewater rapid classes vary depending on water level. At certain higher levels near flood state, almost all of the Cossatot Falls turn into one long rapid.

The World War II fleet oiler USS Cossatot (AO-77) is named after this river.

Camping sites are located near the Cossatot Falls area, and at the nearby Brushy Creek Recreation area.

The Cossatot is listed as a National Wild and Scenic River and an Arkansas Natural and Scenic River.

== See also ==
- Little Cossatot River Bridge
- List of Arkansas rivers
- Cossatot River School District
