= Hochatown, Oklahoma =

Town in the United States

Hochatown, Oklahoma Hocha Tamaha (Choctaw)
- Town
- Location within Oklahoma Location within the United States
- Coordinates: 34°10′01″N 94°46′30″W
- Country: United States
- State: Oklahoma
- County: McCurtain

Area
  - Total: 10.93 sq mi (28.3 km^{2})
  - Land: 10.91 sq mi (28.3 km^{2})
  - Water: 0.02 sq mi (0.052 km^{2})
- Elevation: 715 ft (218 m)

Population (2020)
  - Total: 242
  - Density: 52.0/sq mi (20.07/km^{2})
- Time zone: UTC-6 (Central (CST))
  - Summer (DST): UTC-5 (CDT)
- ZIP Code: 74728 (Broken Bow)
- Area code: 580
- FIPS code: 40-35030
- GNIS feature ID: 2831204
- Website: www.hochatown.gov

Hochatown is a town in McCurtain County, Oklahoma, United States, it is the second town to hold the name after the first was flooded by the damming of the Mountain Fork River to create Broken Bow Lake. The town lies within the Little Dixie region of Oklahoma, an area originally settled largely by Southerners seeking a new start following the Civil War. As of the 2020 census, the town population was 242.

== History ==
=== First Hochatown ===
The land that would become Hochatown was owned by the Choctaw tribe, with twelve families moving into the area in the 1880s. Like Broken Bow, Hochatown grew around the Choctaw Lumber and Coal Company (later named Dierks Forests), gaining a post office in 1894. By 1900 it had become a bustling town. The lumber company built a railroad spur between Hochatown and the community of Eagletown to facilitate export of logs.

At the time of its founding, Hochatown was located in Bok Tuklo County of the Apukshunnubbee District, one of three administrative super-regions comprising the Choctaw Nation.

During the 1920s and 1930s, prime lumber supply dwindled and the lumber company moved to other local areas. Meanwhile, the community became noted for its moonshine production. The town's heyday soon passed, however. The post office shut down in 1963 and the last family left the site in 1966. The cemetery and town church were moved to higher ground while all other buildings were destroyed. The area is now covered by over 200 feet (60 m) of water.

=== Second Hochatown ===
The second incarnation of Hochatown is located approximately one mile west of Broken Bow Lake on U.S. Route 259.

On November 8, 2022, Hochatown residents voted in favor of the ballot question proposing the incorporation of Hochatown, with 129 votes in favor of incorporation and 18 votes against. On, November 28, 2022, the McCurtain County Commissioners gathered to pass articles of incorporation to re-establish Hochatown as an incorporated municipality.

On January 10, 2023, the first meeting of the town trustees for newly incorporated Hochatown was held at the Chapel of the Pines Church. During the meeting, the trustees voted unanimously to appoint Dian Jordan as the town's first mayor and accepted a donation from long-time resident Vojai Reed for one year of free office space to house the first official town hall.

== Geography ==
Hochatown is in north-central McCurtain County along U.S. Route 259, 8 miles (13 km) north of Broken Bow and 20 miles (32 km) north of Idabel, the county seat. To the north, US 259 passes the Cedar Mountains and Boktuklo Mountains, leading 30 miles (48 km) to Smithville. State Highway 259A leads east from Broken Bow 4 miles (6 km) to the dam that forms Broken Bow Lake on the Mountain Fork River.

According to the U.S. Census Bureau, Hochatown has a total area of 10.93 square miles (28.31 km^{2}), of which 0.02 square miles (0.05 km^{2}), or 0.20%, are water. The center of town is drained by Yashau Creek, a south-flowing tributary of the Little River, part of the watershed of the Red River.

== Economy ==
The town economy is based on tourism, largely from Texas. The cabin industry can attract thousands of visitors to the town during peak months. The effect of Airbnb was described in a 2023 NY Times article. In addition to Broken Bow Lake, the area includes Beavers Bend Resort Park, Hochatown State Park, and Cedar Creek Golf Course at Beavers Bend.

== Demographics ==
Historical population
Census	Pop.	Note	%±
2020	242		—
U.S. Decennial Census

Hochatown first appeared as a census designated place in the 2020 census and as a town in the 2023 American Community Survey.

=== 2020 census ===
As of the 2020 census, Hochatown had a population of 242. The median age was 50.9 years. 16.9% of residents were under the age of 18 and 27.7% of residents were 65 years of age or older. For every 100 females there were 101.7 males, and for every 100 females age 18 and over there were 111.6 males age 18 and over.

0.0% of residents lived in urban areas, while 100.0% lived in rural areas.

There were 96 households in Hochatown, of which 30.2% had children under the age of 18 living in them. Of all households, 43.8% were married-couple households, 16.7% were households with a male householder and no spouse or partner present, and 31.3% were households with a female householder and no spouse or partner present. About 24.0% of all households were made up of individuals and 4.1% had someone living alone who was 65 years of age or older.

There were 201 housing units, of which 52.2% were vacant. The homeowner vacancy rate was 1.5% and the rental vacancy rate was 10.8%.

=== Racial and ethnic composition ===
Racial composition as of the 2020 census
Race	Number	Percent
White	197	81.4%
Black or African American	0	0.0%
American Indian and Alaska Native	25	10.3%
Asian	0	0.0%
Native Hawaiian and Other Pacific Islander	0	0.0%
Some other race	2	0.8%
Two or more races	18	7.4%
Hispanic or Latino (of any race)	7	2.9%

== Education ==
It is in the Broken Bow Public Schools school district.
