= De Queen and Eastern Railroad =

DeQueen and Eastern Railroad
Overview
- Headquarters: 10752 Deerwood Park Blvd. Ste. 300, Jacksonville, FL 32256
- Reporting mark: DQE
- Locale: Oklahoma, Arkansas
- Dates of operation: 1900–present

Technical
- Track gauge: 4 ft 8 1/2 in (1,435 mm) standard gauge
- Length: 51 miles (82 km)

The DeQueen and Eastern Railroad (reporting mark DQE), also referred to as the De Queen and Eastern Railroad, is a Class III short-line railroad located in southwest Arkansas and owned by Patriot Rail Company of Jacksonville, Florida. It is operated along with its affiliate, the Texas, Oklahoma and Eastern Railroad (reporting mark TOE) in southeast Oklahoma as a single combined railroad with 91 miles of track. Specifically, the DQE continues west from a railway connection at Perkins, Arkansas through Dierks, Lockesburg and De Queen to the Oklahoma border, while the TOE runs from the border through Broken Bow and Wright City to Valliant, Oklahoma.

== History ==
The DQE was chartered on September 22, 1900, in order to construct a line from De Queen, Arkansas east to a connection with the Kansas City Southern Railway at Perkins, Arkansas, roughly 50 miles. On October 21, 1910, a separate railroad called the Texas, Oklahoma and Eastern (TOE) was chartered to build a line from an interchange with the St. Louis-San Francisco Railway (Frisco) at Valliant, Oklahoma east to De Queen. The DQE quickly bought a controlling interest in the TOE. The TOE laid 24 miles of track from Valliant to Broken Bow, Oklahoma in 1910, and its route was essentially completed when in 1921 it built to the Oklahoma/Arkansas state line, giving it a total of 39.3 miles. The DQE built its own system west from De Queen about 9 miles, meeting the TOE at the state line on January 5, 1921, and essentially creating a unified system.

The line was owned by the Dierks Lumber & Coal Company, later Dierks Forests, which used its railroads to haul primarily lumber, paper, coal and grain. The road had minimal passenger operations, but this ended by 1948. Dierks Forests and the rail lines were sold to Weyerhaeuser Company in the 1960’s, and Weyerhaeuser sold the rail lines to Patriot Rail in 2010.

== Operations ==
The DQE and the TOE essentially operate as a single railroad with 91 miles of track. They still move timber products, like plywood chips and pulpboard, but they also carry bulk products like corn, stone, soybeans and chemicals. The lines interchange with the BNSF Railway through the Kiamichi Railroad at Valliant, with the Canadian Pacific Kansas City (formerly the Kansas City Southern) at De Queen, and with the Union Pacific at Perkins. They also interchange with the shortline WFEC Railroad Company at Valliant. The DQE’s facilities in De Queen include a car repair facility, a wheel shop, a locomotive repair shop, and a maintenance of way building with an equipment repair shop. The TOE’s facilities at Valliant include a maintenance of way equipment repair facility, together with an open car repair shed with two tracks under roof with capacity for 4 cars, and a ready track that will hold 6 cars.
