= Eagletown, Oklahoma =

Eagletown, Oklahoma Ossi Tamaha (Choctaw)
- Census-designated place
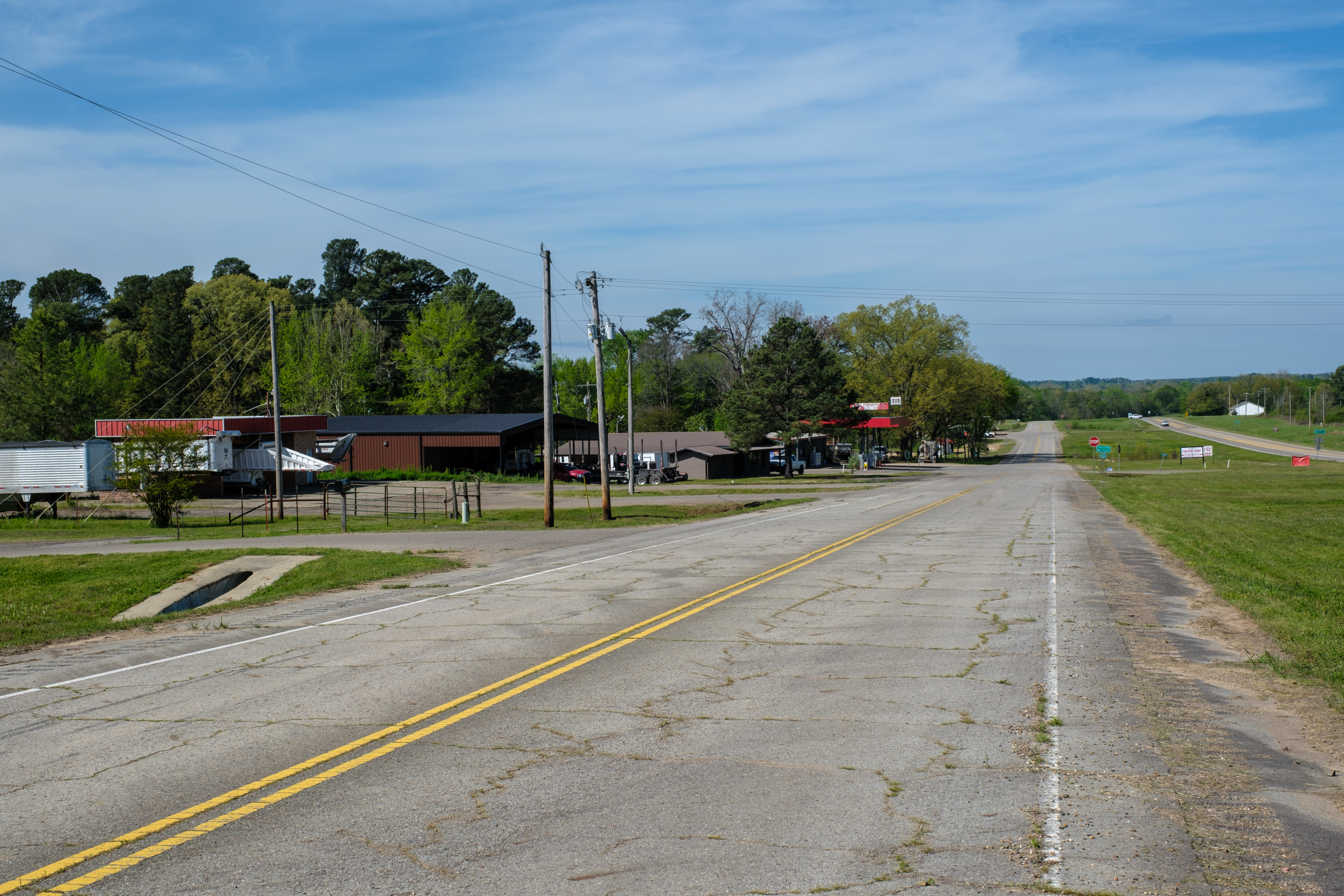

- Location within Oklahoma Location within the United States
- Coordinates: 34°02′30″N 94°34′12″W
- Country: United States
- State: Oklahoma
- County: McCurtain

Area
  - Total: 4.74 sq mi (12.28 km^{2})
  - Land: 4.73 sq mi (12.26 km^{2})
  - Water: 0.0077 sq mi (0.02 km^{2})
- Elevation: 427 ft (130 m)

Population (2020)
  - Total: 404
  - Density: 85.4/sq mi (32.96/km^{2})
- Time zone: UTC-6 (Central (CST))
  - Summer (DST): UTC-5 (CDT)
- ZIP Code: 74734
- FIPS code: 40-22350
- GNIS feature ID: 2629916

Eagletown is an unincorporated community and census-designated place (CDP) in McCurtain County, Oklahoma, United States. The population was 404 at the 2020 census, down from 528 in 2010. Located on the Mountain Fork River, approximately 6 miles (10 km) west of the Oklahoma-Arkansas border, it was the first permanent Choctaw settlement in the Indian Territory, who called it o̱ssi tamaha ("Eagle"). Eagletown was an important town from 1834 to 1906, and after 1850, served as county seat for the Choctaw Nation's Eagle County. The town name was officially changed to "Eagle Town" in 1850, then changed to the present Eagletown in 1892. When Indian Territory was preparing to unite with Oklahoma Territory to form the new state of Oklahoma in 1906, Eagletown lost its county seat status and became just another unincorporated community in the new McCurtain County.

== History ==
Some white settlers had moved to the area near the Mountain Fork River around the present Eagletown during the early 19th century, when the area was known as Miller County, Arkansas, but a boundary change in the 1820s put this area into Indian Territory. The white settlers were forced to move elsewhere in order to resettle the Choctaw tribe from Mississippi. When the first Choctaws arrived in 1832, they found fields that had been cleared for farming and cabins that had housed the previous inhabitants. As required by treaty, the Army established a feeding point here for the distribution of rations. An estimated 852 people were receiving rations here in April 1832. By 1834, the number of people here had grown by 1,500.

The Choctaws invited some of the white missionaries to join them in the move to Indian Territory. The first of these was Rev. Loring S. Williams, who was sent by the American Board of Commissioners for Foreign Missions in 1832. By July 1832, Williams established a station he called Bethabara on the west bank of the Mountain Fork River. (Note: Bethabara is a Hebrew word meaning "crossing.") The crossing was marked by a very large cypress tree that was called "the oldest tree in Oklahoma", dating back to before the Christian Era. (Note: It was said to be over 2,000 years old. A lightning strike in 1982 killed the tree. Williams chose the name because this was the only location for fording the river for many miles in each direction.) He organized the first church in Choctaw country in 1834 and opened a school the next year. He also obtained the authority to establish a post office in 1834, and served as the first postmaster. The post office and the town were then known as "Eagle Town." (Note: Williams had to close Bethabara and leave the area in 1838, because of ill health.) The name of both was officially changed to "Eagletown" on December 16, 1892. Another missionary, Reverend Cyrus Byington, arrived in late 1835. Byington spent 31 years here, and was noted for translating both religious and secular materials into a written Choctaw language that he created. He established the Stockbridge Mission on the other (east) side of the river from Bethabara. He was most noted for producing the Dictionary of the Choctaw Language. Byington also supervised the adjacent Iyanubbi Female Seminary, a boarding school for Choctaw girls that operated from 1844 until 1861.

Eagletown soon became a trading center on the Military Trace, an 1820s wagon trail through Choctaw Country built to connect Fort Towson to other military forts in Arkansas. After the Choctaw Nation created and passed its constitution in 1850, Eagletown became the "courtground" (i. e., county seat) of the newly created Eagle County. Jefferson Gardner, a Choctaw trader, opened a general store in 1874 on the east bank of the river. In 1884, built an imposing house that is now on the National Register of Historic Places (NRHP). Gardner became principal chief of the Choctaw Nation, but lost his fortune shortly after his term ended in 1896.

After Oklahoma became a state, more white settlers moved into the former Choctaw territory. Eagle County had been abolished and superseded by McCurtain County at statehood. Some of the settlers became farmers, while others worked in the expanding timber industry. Choctaw Lumber Company (later Dierks Forests) built a camp in Eagletown to house the timber workers. The company also built a railway—the Texas, Oklahoma and Eastern Railroad—that connected to its line in Arkansas.

The Texas, Oklahoma and Eastern Railroad laid a track from Valliant, Oklahoma, to DeQueen, Arkansas, in 1920. It built a depot 2.5 miles (4.0 km) southeast of the river crossing. Many of the existing Eagleton businesses moved to new facilities near the new depot. Little remains of the old Eagle Town except the Gardner house.

== Geography ==
Eagletown is in eastern McCurtain County mostly on the south side of U.S. Route 70, which leads west 9 miles (14 km) to Broken Bow and east 14 miles (23 km) to De Queen, Arkansas. Idabel, the McCurtain county seat, is 21 miles (34 km) to the southwest.

According to the U.S. Census Bureau, the Eagletown CDP has a total area of 4.7 square miles (12.2 km^{2}), of which 0.01 square miles (0.03 km^{2}), or 0.19%, are water. The Mountain Fork River, a south-flowing tributary of the Little River and part of the Red River watershed, forms the western edge of the CDP.

== Demographics ==
Historical population
Census	Pop.	Note	%±
2010	528		—
2020	404		−23.5%
U.S. Decennial Census

=== 2020 census ===
As of the 2020 census, Eagletown had a population of 404. The median age was 45.3 years. 21.3% of residents were under the age of 18 and 15.8% of residents were 65 years of age or older. For every 100 females there were 100.0 males, and for every 100 females age 18 and over there were 91.6 males age 18 and over.

0.0% of residents lived in urban areas, while 100.0% lived in rural areas.

There were 160 households in Eagletown, of which 24.4% had children under the age of 18 living in them. Of all households, 31.3% were married-couple households, 31.3% were households with a male householder and no spouse or partner present, and 30.0% were households with a female householder and no spouse or partner present. About 43.8% of all households were made up of individuals and 25.6% had someone living alone who was 65 years of age or older.

There were 187 housing units, of which 14.4% were vacant. The homeowner vacancy rate was 0.0% and the rental vacancy rate was 2.2%.

Racial composition as of the 2020 census
Race	Number	Percent
White	297	73.5%
Black or African American	23	5.7%
American Indian and Alaska Native	26	6.4%
Asian	0	0.0%
Native Hawaiian and Other Pacific Islander	0	0.0%
Some other race	1	0.2%
Two or more races	57	14.1%
Hispanic or Latino (of any race)	4	1.0%

=== 2010 census ===
As of the 2010 census, the population was 528.

== Education ==
It is in the Eagletown Public Schools school district.

== Notable person ==
- Cyrus Byington - American missionary
