= Texas, Oklahoma and Eastern Railroad =

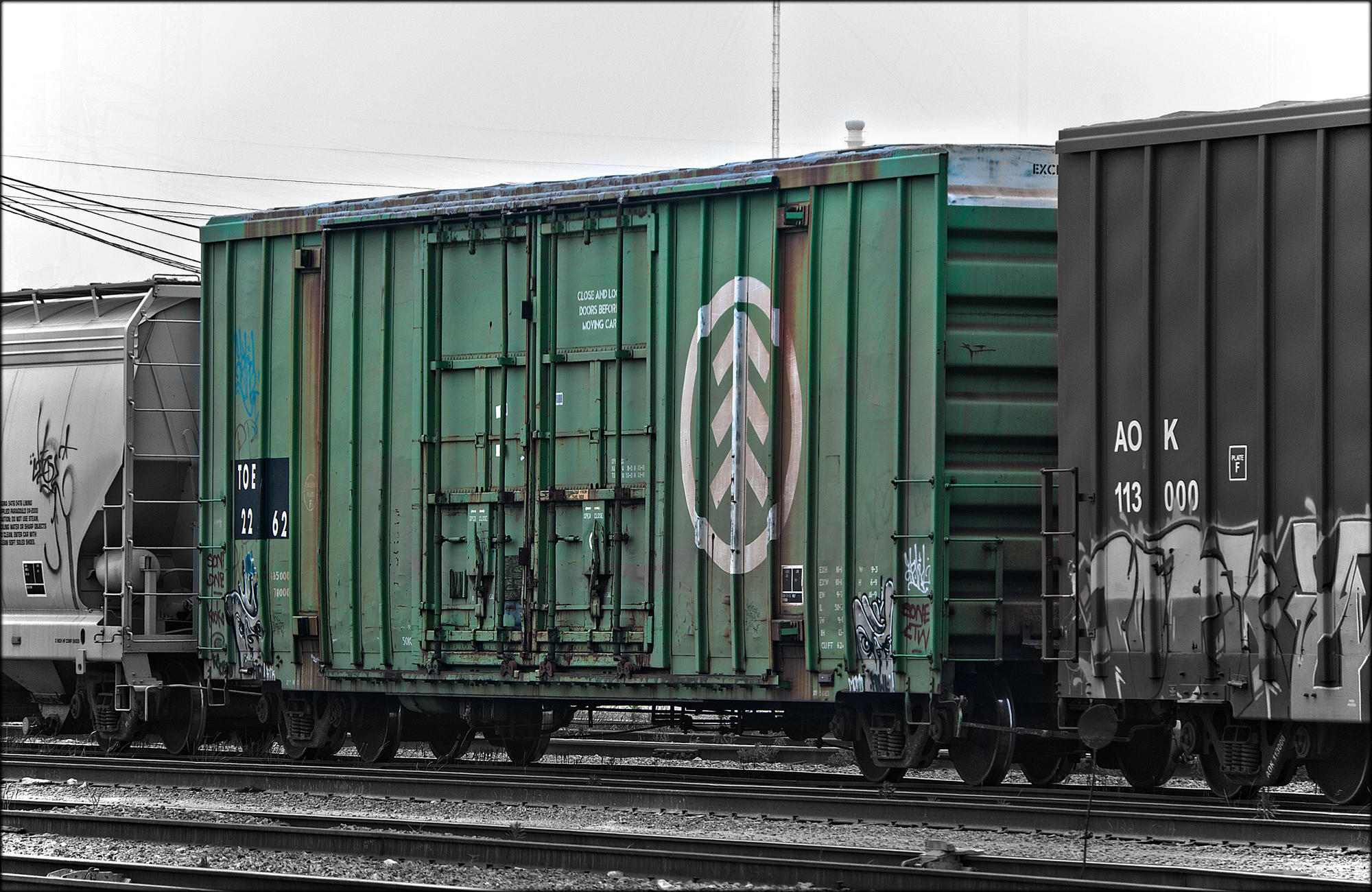
- Texas, Oklahoma and Eastern Boxcar

Overview
- Headquarters: 10752 Deerwood Park Blvd. Ste. 300, Jacksonville, FL 32256
- Reporting mark: TOE
- Locale: Oklahoma, Arkansas
- Dates of operation: 1910–present

Technical
- Track gauge: 4 ft 8 1/2 in (1,435 mm) standard gauge
- Length: 39.3 miles (63.2 km)

The Texas, Oklahoma and Eastern Railroad (reporting mark TOE) is a Class III short-line railroad owned by Patriot Rail Company of Jacksonville, Florida, with 39.3 miles of track in southeastern Oklahoma. It is operated along with its affiliate, the De Queen and Eastern Railroad (reporting mark DQE), in southwest Arkansas, as a single combined railroad with 91 miles of track. Specifically, the TOE runs from Valliant, Oklahoma through Wright City, Broken Bow, and Eagletown to the Oklahoma/Arkansas border, where the DQE continues through De Queen, Lockesburg and Dierks to Perkins, Arkansas.

== History ==
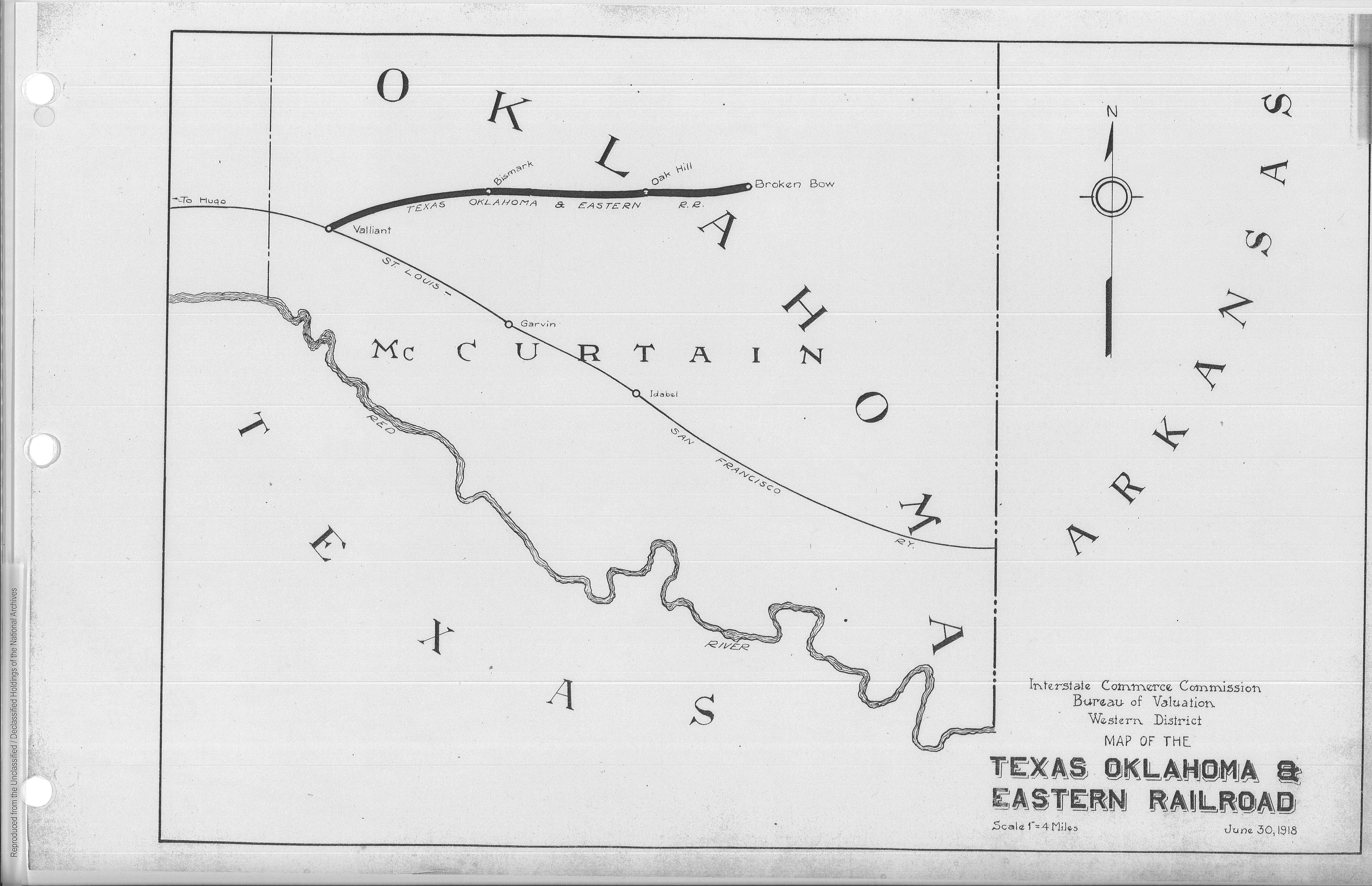
1917 map of the railroad

The TOE was chartered October 21, 1910 to build a railroad from Valliant eastward to De Queen, but was quickly acquired by DQE. It was essentially completed by 1921 when it built to the state line, at which point it was shortly joined by DQE’s line. From an early date, ownership was held by Dierks Lumber & Coal Company, later Dierks Forests, which used the lines to haul primarily lumber, paper, coal and grain. The roads also had minimal passenger operations, but this ended by 1948. Dierks Forests and the rail lines were sold to Weyerhaeuser Company in the 1960’s, and Weyerhaeuser sold the rail lines to Patriot Rail in 2010.

== Operations ==
The TOE/DQE still move timber products, like plywood chips and pulpboard. But they also carry bulk products like corn, stone, soybeans and chemicals.

The lines interchange with the BNSF Railway through the Kiamichi Railroad at Valliant; with the Canadian Pacific Kansas City (formerly the Kansas City Southern Railway) at De Queen; and, with the Union Pacific at Perkins. They also interchange with the shortline WFEC Railroad Company at Valliant.

Valliant has a maintenance of way equipment repair facility, and an open car repair shed with two tracks under roof with capacity for 4 cars, together with a ready track that will hold 6 cars. The DQE’s facilities in De Queen include a car repair facility, a wheel shop, a locomotive repair shop, and a maintenance of way building with an equipment repair shop.
