= Nancy Creek =

Nancy Creek may refer to:

- Nancy Creek (Atlanta)
- Nancy Creek (Cartersville), Georgia
- Nancy Creek (Washington)
- Nancy Creek (Montana)
- Nances Creek, Alabama

== See also ==
- Nancy Town Creek, Banks County, Georgia
- Nancy Long Creek, Douglas County, Georgia
- Nancy Branch, stream in Arkansas
- Nancy Hanks Creek, South Dakota
