= Bok Tuklo County, Choctaw Nation =

Historical subdivision in Choctaw Nation

Bok Tuklo County was a political subdivision of the Choctaw Nation of Indian Territory, prior to Oklahoma being admitted as a state. The county formed part of the Nation’s Apukshunnubbee District, or Second District, one of three administrative super-regions. The subdivision was located within the current McCurtain County.

== History ==
Bok Tuklo County, Choctaw Nation was named from the Choctaw words bok, or “creek,” and tuklo, or “two.” The two creeks commemorated by the name were Lukfata Creek and Yasho Bok (now called Yasho Creek), which ran parallel to one another north to south, across much of the county.

Bok Tuklo County’s boundaries were established and designated according to easily recognizable natural landmarks, as were the boundaries of all Choctaw Nation counties. Little River formed its southern and eastern boundaries. The county’s eastern boundary was formed by a line drawn from a north-south stretch of Little River to an east-west section.

Four counties bordered Bok Tuklo County: Eagle County on the east, Red River county on the south, and Towson County on the west. Its county seat was Oak Hill, a meeting ground which is no longer extant.

The county served as an election district for members of the National Council, and as a unit of local administration. Constitutional officers, all of whom served for two-year terms and were elected by the voters, included the county judge, sheriff, and a ranger. The judge’s duties included oversight of overall county administration. The sheriff collected taxes, monitored unlawful intrusion by intruders (usually white Americans from the United States), and conducted the census. The county ranger advertised and sold strayed livestock.

== Statehood ==
As Oklahoma’s statehood approached, its leading citizens, who were gathered for the Oklahoma Constitutional Convention, realized in laying out the future state’s counties that, while logically designed, the Choctaw Nation’s counties could not exist as economically viable political subdivisions. In most, the county seat existed generally for holding county court and not as a population center.

This conundrum was also recognized by the framers of the proposed State of Sequoyah, who met in 1905 to propose statehood for the Indian Territory. The Sequoyah Constitutional Convention also proposed a county structure that abolished the Choctaw counties. Bok Tuklo County was included within the territory of the proposed McCurtain County.

Much of this proposition was borrowed two years later by Oklahoma’s framers, who adopted certain of these concepts for the future McCurtain County in Oklahoma. The territory formerly comprising Bok Tuklo County, Choctaw Nation was wholly incorporated into McCurtain County.

Bok Tuklo County ceased to exist upon Oklahoma’s statehood on November 16, 1907.
