= Broken Bow Lake =

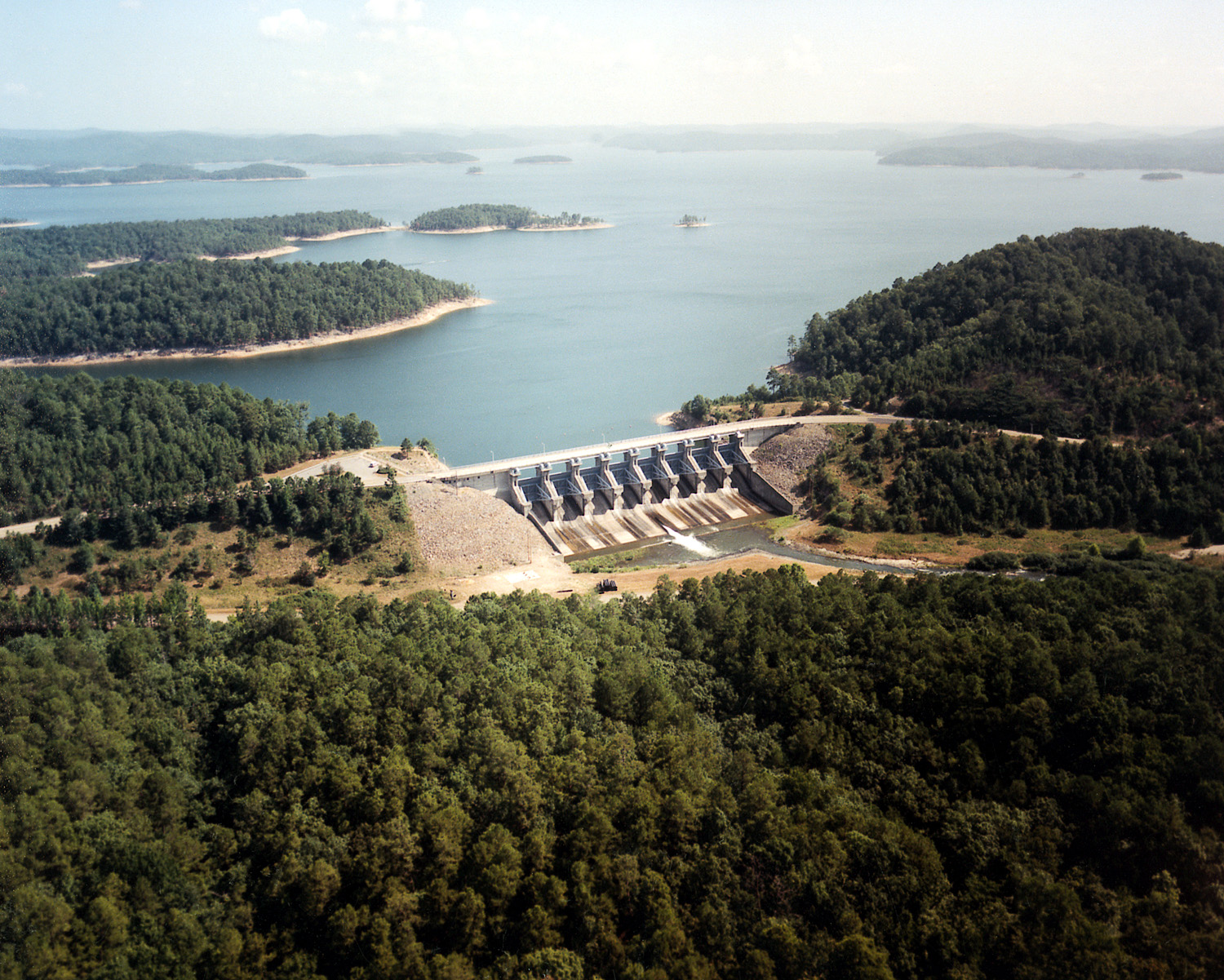
- The spillway on the southern edge

- Location within Oklahoma Location within the United States
- Location: McCurtain County, Oklahoma
- Coordinates: 34°10′49″N 94°41′21″W
- Type: reservoir
- Primary inflows: Mountain Fork River
- Primary outflows: Mountain Fork River
- Basin countries: United States
- Max. length: 22 mi (35 km)
- Surface area: 14,000 acres (5,700 ha)
- Average depth: 62 ft (19 m)
- Max. depth: 185 ft (56 m)
- Water volume: 918,070 acre⋅ft (1.13242×10^{9} m^{3})
- Shore length^{1}: 180 mi (290 km)
- Surface elevation: 627 ft (191 m)
- Settlements: Broken Bow, Oklahoma
- ^{1} Shore length is not a well-defined measure.

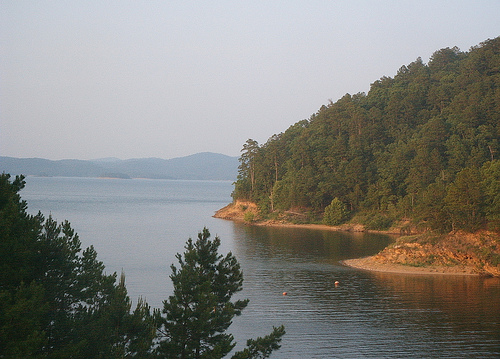
Broken Bow Lake

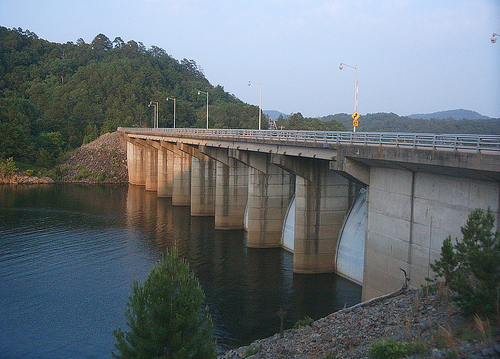
North side of the spillway at Broken Bow Lake

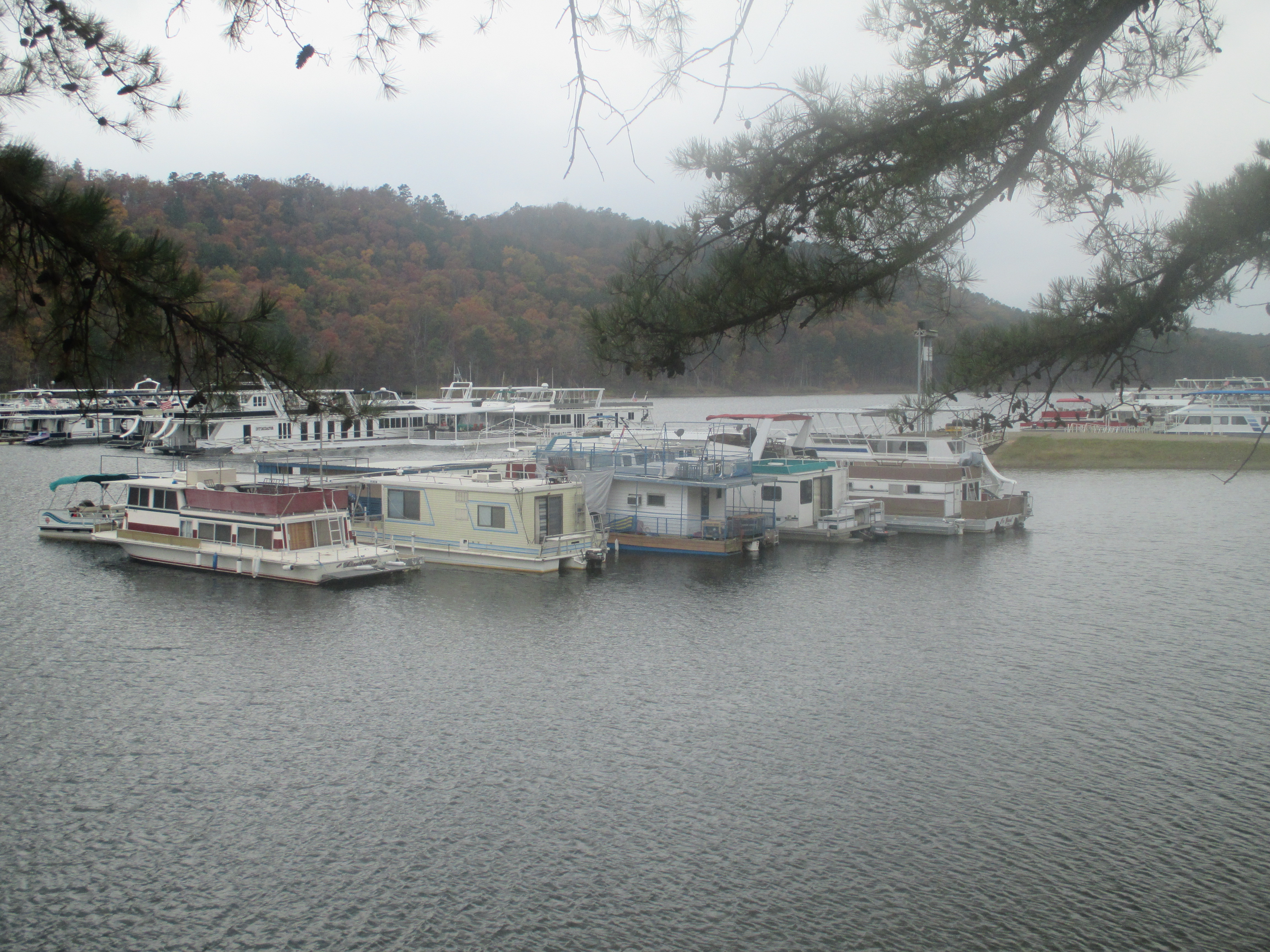
Houseboats on Broken Bow Lake (2013)

Broken Bow Lake is a reservoir in southeastern Oklahoma, located on Mountain Fork River and 9 miles (14 km) northeast of the town of Broken Bow in McCurtain County. It is one of the largest fresh water lakes within the state of Oklahoma, and a popular tourist destination for locals and visitors from neighboring Texas and Arkansas.

The lake stretches 22 miles (35 km) back into the Ouachita Mountain country where its unusual beauty and scenic appeal beckons all sorts of nature enthusiasts. The mountain terrain is densely forested and there are many species of birds native to the area for birdwatchers to enjoy.

== History ==
Points of historical interest located on or near Broken Bow Lake are old Hochatown, inundated by the lake, which was settled by the Choctaw Indians in the early 1830s. The Choctaws incorporated the area into Bok Tuklo County, a part of the Apukshunnubbee District of the Choctaw Nation.

Broken Bow, center of the Oklahoma timber production, was named by the Dierks brothers, pioneer lumbermen, for their original home of Broken Bow, Nebraska. The Broken Bow post office was established in 1911. Idabel, seat of McCurtain County was first named Purnell, after Isaac Purnell, a railroad official. When postal officials rejected that designation, the name was changed to Mitchell, honoring another railroad company officer. Postal officials also rejected that because another post office of the same name existed elsewhere in the territory. They named the post office Bokhoma (a Choctaw word meaning Red River), which opened December 15, 1902. Railroad officials then chose the name Idabel, a compound of the names of Isaac Purnell's two daughters, Ida and Bell. The post office was then renamed Idabel. Located nearby at the site of an old Choctaw settlement is Beavers Bend Resort Park, named for John T. Beavers, a Choctaw intermarried citizen.

=== Development ===
Broken Bow Lake was authorized by the Flood Control Act of 1958 (approved July 3, 1958 (HD 170, 85th Congress, 1st Session)) and another Flood Control Act (approved October 23, 1967 (SD 137, 87th Congress, 2nd Session)). The project was designed and built under the supervision of the Tulsa District of the United States Army Corps of Engineers. The lake covers 14,000 acres (57 km^{2}) and has a shoreline of 180 miles (290 km). Elevation of the surface is 627 feet (191 m).

Construction began in October 1961 by contractor Nello L. Teer Company of Durham, North Carolina; impoundment began in October 1968, and the conservation pool was filled in April 1970. The first power unit was put on line in January 1970, and the second unit in June 1970.

== Recreation ==
Two nature trails are present: the Big Oak Nature Trail and the Beaver Lodge Nature Trail. The Big Oak trail is about a quarter of a mile long and is suitable for use by senior citizens and small children. The rugged and beautiful Beaver Lodge Nature Trail is a two-way trail located near the River Bend area south of the dam and winds along a clear stream through a valley surrounded by pine-covered hills.

Numerous park areas located around the lake gives visitors an excellent opportunity for outdoor family fun and relaxation. Recreational facilities include boat launching ramps, camping, picnic sites, beaches, water and sanitary facilities. There are two Oklahoma state parks nearby Broken Bow Lake; Beavers Bend Resort Park and Hochatown State Park. Cedar Creek Golf Course at Beavers Bend is another attraction close to the lake.

The climate at Broken Bow Lake offers outdoor sportsmen opportunities for year-round angling, with various species of trout and bass available.

Hunting on project lands are equally good for hunting enthusiasts, and with the exception of developed areas and certain Game Preserves, all project lands are open to the public for hunting. Deer are the most important big game species found in the area, though wild turkey and other sport can be found in this area.
