= Hochatown State Park =

State park in Oklahoma, United States

- Location within the United States
- Nearest city: Broken Bow, Oklahoma
- Coordinates: 34°10′50″N 94°43′50″W
- Created: 1966

Hochatown State Park was once an independent Oklahoma state park in far-southeastern Oklahoma, north of the city of Broken Bow. It was combined into Beavers Bend State Park in 2017. It is a popular destination for tourists from Oklahoma and Texas interested in camping or boating on Broken Bow Lake.

== Background ==
Hochatown State Park was named after the small town of Hochatown. Present-day Hochatown is actually the second community in the area to bear the name. The original community was forced to relocate to its current location on U.S. Route 259 when Broken Bow Lake was created through the damming of Mountain Fork River by the United States Army Corps of Engineers in the late 1960s. Remnants of "Old Hochatown" can still be seen today while scuba diving at the bottom of Broken Bow Lake.

This park was originally part of Beavers Bend State Park but was separated as its own park in 1966. In 2017, the Oklahoma Department of Tourism and Recreation combined the parks. This area of the park focuses on meeting the needs of visitors wishing to enjoy Broken Bow Lake. Accommodations inside the park range from the 40-room Lakeview Lodge to campsites in the Stevens Gap, Carson Creek and Cedar Creek areas. Recreation amenities and facilities include a fish cleaning station, group shelters and picnic sites, full and semi-modern RV campsites, primitive sites, comfort stations, sanitary waste stations, lighted boat ramps, swimming beaches, playgrounds, hiking trails. Other lodging choices at Beavers Bend State Park include 47 cabins and two group camps, some of which offer river views.
