= Red River County, Choctaw Nation =

Red River County was a political subdivision of the Choctaw Nation of Indian Territory, prior to Oklahoma being admitted as a state. The county formed part of the Nation's Apukshunnubbee District, or Second District, one of three administrative super-regions.

== History ==
The county, also called Bok Homma Kaunti, from the Choctaw words bok, for river, and homma, for red, provides a rare instance in which the English name for the county was a direct translation from its Choctaw name.

Red River County was one of the original 19 counties created by the General Council of the Choctaw Nation in 1850.

Red River County's boundaries were established and designated according to easily recognizable natural landmarks, as were the boundaries of all Choctaw Nation counties. Red River formed its southern boundary, and Little River formed its northern. Arkansas was to its east. Its western boundary was a line drawn to connect Little River and Red River, and separate it from its agricultural twin, Towson County.

Three counties bordered Red River County: Bok Tuklo and Eagle counties on the north, and Towson County on the west.

Red River County was known for its rich alluvial land. Cotton plantations dotted the area prior to the Civil War. Small-scale farming was prevalent for decades afterward. The area was never populated heavily, and much of it today forms the Red Slough Wildlife Management Area. At the time of statehood its only town was Idabel, and its significant settlements were America, Cerrogordo, Garvin, Goodwater, Harrington, Harris, Janis, and Shawneetown.

The county served as an election district for members of the National Council, and as a unit of local administration. Constitutional officers, all of whom served for two-year terms and were elected by the voters, included the county judge, sheriff, and a ranger. The judge's duties included oversight of overall county administration. The sheriff collected taxes, monitored unlawful intrusion by intruders (usually white Americans from the United States), and conducted the census. The county ranger advertised and sold strayed livestock.

== Statehood ==
As Oklahoma's statehood approached, its leading citizens, who were gathered for the Oklahoma Constitutional Convention, realized in laying out the future state's counties that, while logically designed, the Choctaw Nation's counties could not exist as economically viable political subdivisions. In most the county seat existed generally for holding county court and not as a population center. While this was not generally true of Red River County, with its bustling commercial town of Idabel, it would have to be dismantled in order to accommodate changes required by the region at large.

This conundrum was also recognized by the framers of the proposed State of Sequoyah, who met in 1905 to propose statehood for the Indian Territory. The Sequoyah Constitutional Convention also proposed a county structure that abolished the Choctaw counties. Red River County was included within the territory of the proposed McCurtain County.

Much of this proposition was borrowed two years later by Oklahoma's framers, who adopted principally the same concept for the future McCurtain County in Oklahoma. The territory formerly comprising Red River County, Choctaw Nation is incorporated wholly into McCurtain County.

Red River County ceased to exist upon Oklahoma's statehood on November 16, 1907.
