= Broken Bow, Oklahoma =

City in Oklahoma, United States

- City
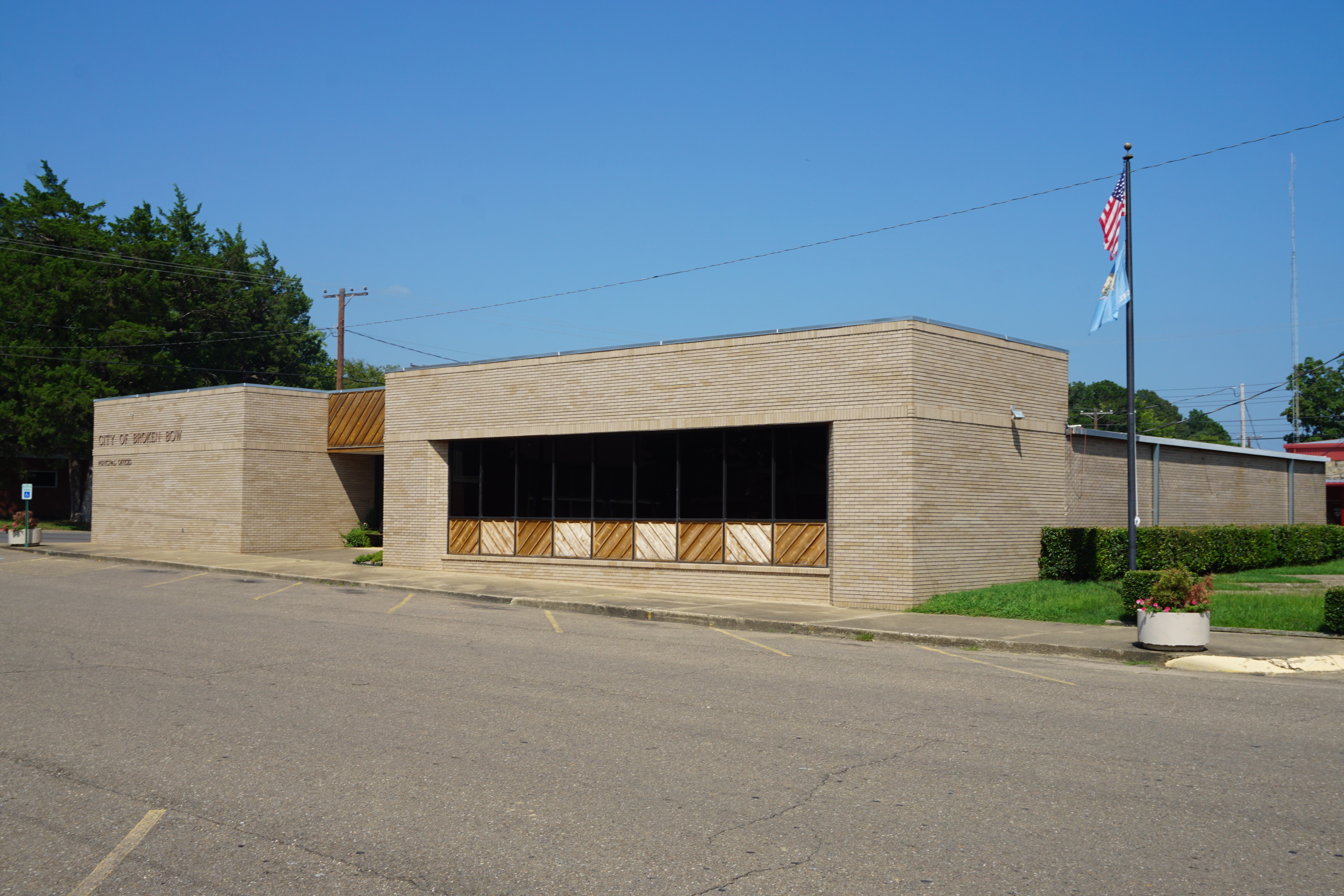
- Broken Bow municipal offices

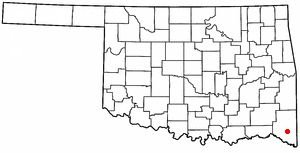
- Location in Oklahoma
- Coordinates: 34°1′47″N 94°44′30″W
- Country: United States
- State: Oklahoma
- County: McCurtain

Government
  - Type: Council-manager
  - Mayor: Jerry Don Smith
  - City Manager: Vicki Pieratt

Area
  - Total: 6.23 sq mi (16.13 km^{2})
  - Land: 6.15 sq mi (15.93 km^{2})
  - Water: 0.077 sq mi (0.20 km^{2})
- Elevation: 453 ft (138 m)

Population (2020)
  - Total: 4,228
  - Density: 687.3/sq mi (265.36/km^{2})
- Time zone: UTC-6 (Central (CST))
  - Summer (DST): UTC-5 (CDT)
- ZIP Code: 74728
- Area code: 580
- FIPS code: 40-09100
- GNIS feature ID: 2409915
- Website: www.brokenbowok.gov

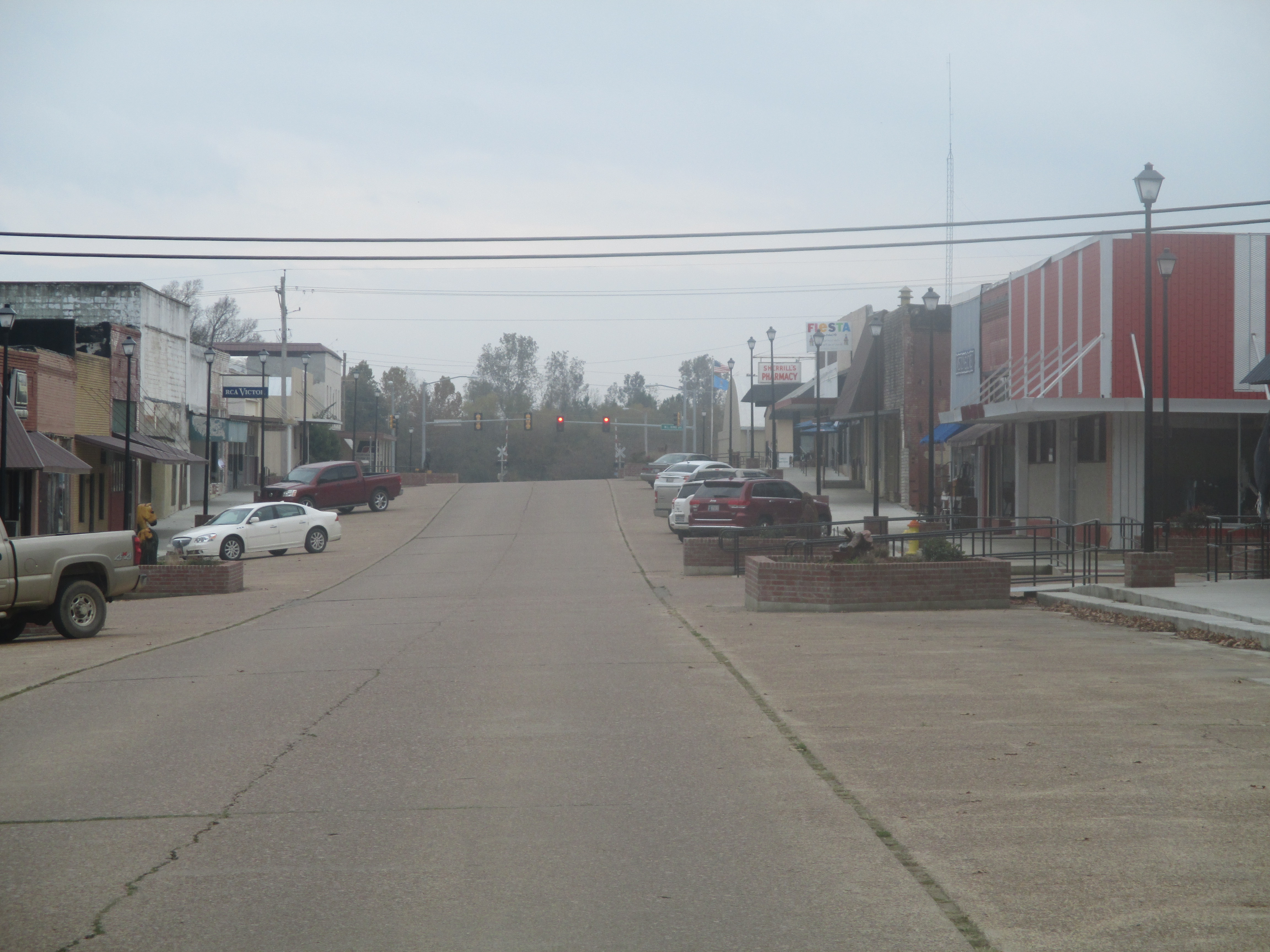
A portion of downtown Broken Bow

Broken Bow is a city in McCurtain County, Oklahoma, United States. The population was 4,228 at the 2020 census. It is named after Broken Bow, Nebraska, the former hometown of the city's founders, the Dierks brothers.

== History ==
The land that would become Broken Bow was owned by the Choctaw tribe prior to being settled by non-native Americans. At the time of its founding, Broken Bow was located in Bok Tuklo County of the Apukshunubbee District, one of three administrative super-regions of the Choctaw Nation. Growing around a lumber company started by the Dierks brothers, Broken Bow had a population of 1,983 just a decade after its incorporation in 1911.

Other Dierks-associated legacies in town include Dierks Elementary School, Dierks Street, and Dierks Train #227 which is preserved in the town. The city lies within the Little Dixie region of Oklahoma, an area originally settled largely by Southerners seeking a new start following the Civil War.

The city was the location of the wounding and capture of murderer Richard Wayne Snell in 1984, following his shootout with local police. Snell had shot and killed two men in Arkansas, a pawn shop owner and Arkansas State Trooper Louis P. Bryant.

== Geography ==
Broken Bow is in central McCurtain County, about 12 miles (19 km) north-northeast of Idabel, the county seat, and 16 miles (26 km) west of the Arkansas border. According to the U.S. Census Bureau, the city has a total area of 6.2 square miles (16 km^{2}), of which 6.1 square miles (16 km^{2}) are land and 0.08 square miles (0.21 km^{2}), or 1.21%, are water. The west side of the city is drained by Yashau Creek, while the east side is drained by Yanubee Creek; both creeks are south-flowing tributaries of the Little River, which joins the Red River at Fulton, Arkansas.

Broken Bow is served by US Route 70, US Route 259, and Oklahoma State Highway 3. Intercity bus service is available from Jefferson Lines in De Queen, Arkansas, about 24 miles (39 km) to the east.

Broken Bow stands in a transition zone between the Red River basin to the south and the Ouachita Mountains to the north. While the Ouachita Mountains are sandstone ridges that are considered the roughest land in Oklahoma, the Red River basin is considered fertile. 10 miles (16 km) north of Broken Bow is Broken Bow Lake, created by the Army Corps of Engineers by damming the Mountain Fork River. The lake's creation forced Hochatown to relocate to its present-day location. Broken Bow Lake covers 14,220 acres (57.5 km^{2}) and has 180 miles (290 km) of shoreline.

The city sits at the foothills of the Kiamichi Mountains, a subrange of the Ouachita Mountains. The Kiamichi Mountains sit within Le Flore, Pushmataha, and McCurtain counties near the towns of Poteau and Albion. The Kiamichi peaks line up south of the Kiamichi River and reach 2,500 feet (760 m) in elevation, about 50 miles (80 km) north of Broken Bow. The range is the namesake of Kiamichi Country, the official tourism designation for southeastern Oklahoma.

Black bear, coyote, bobcat, deer, minks, bats, bald eagles, and varieties of woodpeckers, doves, owls, and road runners are native to the Kiamichi Mountains region.

=== Climate ===
Climate data for Broken Bow, Oklahoma
Month	Jan	Feb	Mar	Apr	May	Jun	Jul	Aug	Sep	Oct	Nov	Dec	Year
Mean daily maximum °F (°C)	51.7 (10.9)	56.4 (13.6)	65.4 (18.6)	74.6 (23.7)	81.0 (27.2)	88.4 (31.3)	93.1 (33.9)	93.4 (34.1)	86.0 (30.0)	76.4 (24.7)	64.8 (18.2)	54.9 (12.7)	73.8 (23.2)
Mean daily minimum °F (°C)	26.9 (−2.8)	31.0 (−0.6)	39.0 (3.9)	48.4 (9.1)	56.9 (13.8)	64.4 (18.0)	68.0 (20.0)	67.0 (19.4)	61.3 (16.3)	48.8 (9.3)	39.7 (4.3)	30.6 (−0.8)	48.5 (9.2)
Average precipitation inches (mm)	2.9 (74)	3.5 (89)	5.3 (130)	4.7 (120)	6.6 (170)	4.3 (110)	3.9 (99)	3.1 (79)	4.7 (120)	4.3 (110)	4.5 (110)	4.1 (100)	51.9 (1,320)
Source: Weatherbase.com

== Demographics ==
Historical population
Census	Pop.	Note	%±
1920	1,983		—
1930	2,291		15.5%
1940	2,367		3.3%
1950	1,838		−22.3%
1960	2,087		13.5%
1970	2,980		42.8%
1980	3,965		33.1%
1990	3,961		−0.1%
2000	4,230		6.8%
2010	4,120		−2.6%
2020	4,228		2.6%
U.S. Decennial Census

=== 2020 census ===
As of the 2020 census, Broken Bow had a population of 4,228. The median age was 34.0 years; 29.0% of residents were under the age of 18, and 15.9% of residents were 65 years of age or older. For every 100 females there were 90.4 males, and for every 100 females age 18 and over there were 82.4 males age 18 and over.

Less than 0.1% of residents lived in urban areas, while 100.0% lived in rural areas.

There were 1,608 households in Broken Bow, of which 37.0% had children under the age of 18 living in them. Of all households, 35.8% were married-couple households, 16.9% were households with a male householder and no spouse or partner present, and 38.7% were households with a female householder and no spouse or partner present. About 31.5% of all households were made up of individuals and 14.5% had someone living alone who was 65 years of age or older.

There were 1,762 housing units, of which 8.7% were vacant. Among occupied housing units, 48.8% were owner-occupied and 51.2% were renter-occupied. The homeowner vacancy rate was 1.2% and the rental vacancy rate was 6.3%.

Racial composition as of the 2020 census
Race	Percent
White	50.3%
Black or African American	6.6%
American Indian and Alaska Native	17.9%
Asian	0.6%
Native Hawaiian and Other Pacific Islander	6.2%
Some other race	4.8%
Two or more races	13.5%
Hispanic or Latino (of any race)	10.0%

=== 2010 census ===
As of the 2010 census, there were 4,120 people, 1,599 households, and 1,036 families residing in the city. The population density was 824 inhabitants per square mile (318/km^{2}). There were 1,793 housing units at an average density of 359.6 per square mile (138.8/km^{2}).

There were 1,599 households, out of which 31.5% had children under the age of 18 living with them, 35.8% were married couples living together, 23.2% had a female householder with no husband present, and 35.2% were non-families. 32.5% of all households were made up of individuals, and 15.0% had someone living alone who was 65 years of age or older. The average household size was 2.51, and the average family size was 3.17.

In the city, the population was spread out, with 29.9% under the age of 18, 54.2% from 18–64, and 15.9% who were 65 years of age or older. The median age was 35.3 years. Males made up 46.2% of the population, while females made up 53.8%.

The median income for a household in the city was $19,350, and the median income for a family was $22,500. Males had a median income of $32,2608 versus $20,895 for females. The per capita income for the city was $14,381. About 36.6% of families and 46.9% of the population were below the poverty line, including 46.9% of those under age 18 and 31.8% of those age 65 or over.

== Economy ==
In recent years, Broken Bow has seen an economic boom through the development of its timber and tourism industries. The town is also home to a chicken-processing plant owned by Tyson Industries.

=== Tourism ===
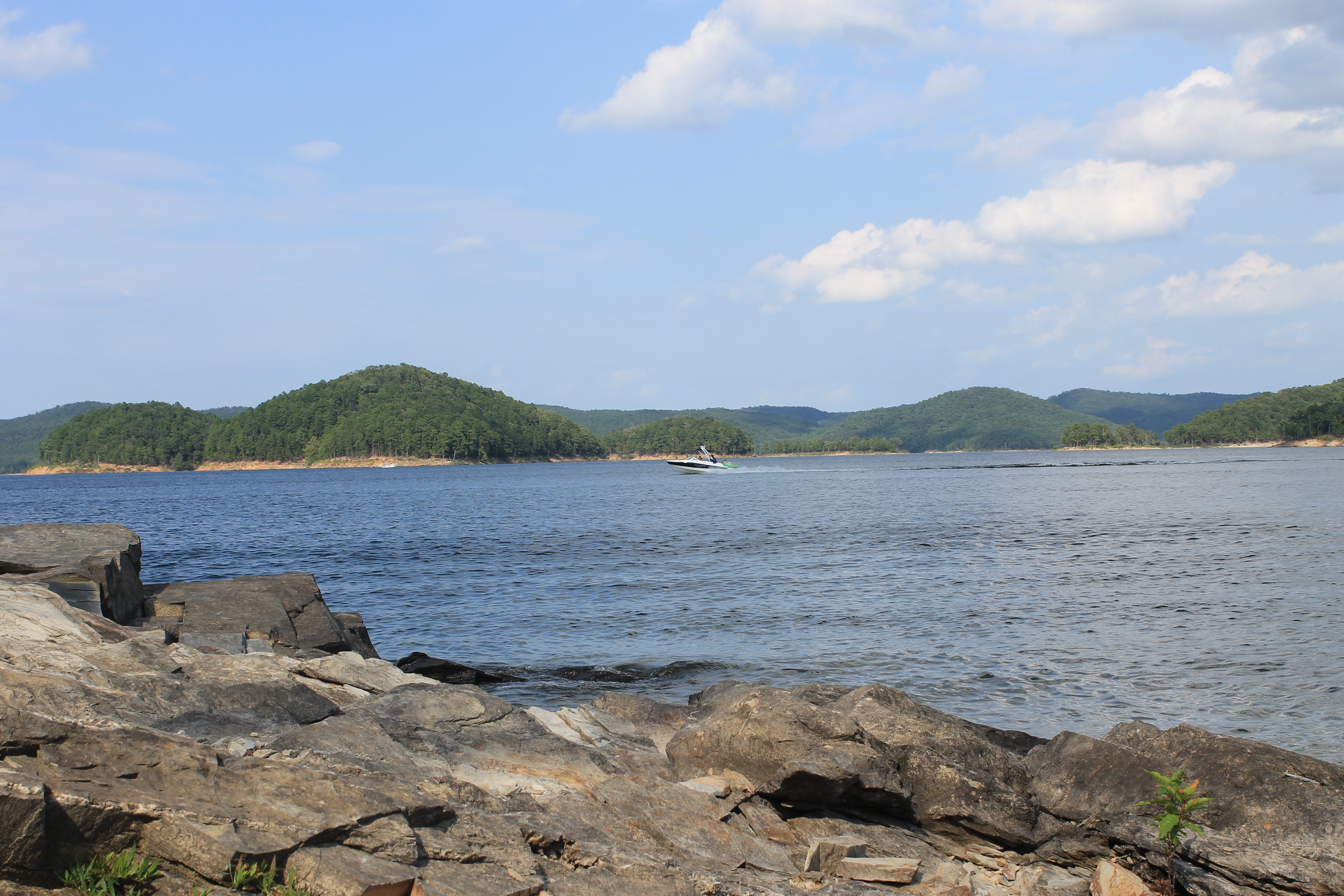
Broken Bow Coves

In addition to being home of Broken Bow Lake, the city is a gateway for tourists visiting Beavers Bend Resort Park, Hochatown State Park, and Cedar Creek Golf Course at Beavers Bend. Hunters also visit the region, which bills itself as the "deer capital of the world."

Broken Bow is home to two museums containing Native American artifacts. The Gardner Mansion and Museum was the historic home of the "Chief of the Choctaws" and was built in 1884. The Indian Memorial Museum houses pre-historic Indian pottery, fossils, Quartz crystal and antique glass.

=== Timber ===
The forest industry is by far the area's largest business concern. Each year some 60 million cubic feet (1,700,000 m^{3}) of lumber are harvested in McCurtain County, and great care is taken to ensure the prolonged health of local pine and hardwood forests. The Oklahoma State Department of Agriculture Forestry Division and United States Forest Service have a large presence in the area and are constantly surveying the area forests in order to prevent wildfires.

Weyerhaeuser Company operates a large plant in nearby Idabel, and International Paper also operates a large mill in Valliant. Additionally, Weyerhaeuser maintains several pine tree plantations throughout McCurtain County. Pan Pacific operates a fiberboard plant on the west side of Broken Bow. J.M. Huber Corporation's Huber Engineered Woods subsidiary is the latest big player to enter the area, with a very large oriented strand board (OSB) plant, also on the west side of Broken Bow. Huber plans to employ about 160 people at the site and expects to create another 250 jobs within the local community.

== Education ==
Most of Broken Bow is in the Broken Bow Public Schools school district. The municipality extends into the Lukfata Public School school district.

=== Athletics ===
While Broken Bow's athletic history is limited primarily to high school football, it is recognized as one of the top high school programs in the state of Oklahoma. The Broken Bow Savages currently hold four state football championships, ranking third in class AAAA in the state, behind the Clinton Red Tornadoes (14) and the Ada Cougars (19). In addition to their four state championships, the Savages have numerous state title game appearances, the most recent of which came in 2004 when the Savages lost to Clinton. The team's last real push for the OSSAA State Championship game was when the 2008 Savage football team lost to the Glenpool Warriors in a nail-biter 12–7 in the state semi-finals. Which ended their season with a record of 12–1.

Broken Bow High School integrated in 1964. LeVell Hill and Larry Taylor were the first Black athletes to play for Broken Bow High School. They promptly led Broken Bow to its first appearance in a football state championship game. Broken Bow lost to the Clinton Red Tornadors in 1965. LeVell Hill and Larry Taylor led Broken Bow to Its first State Track Championship in 1966. Larry Taylor entered the United States Marine Corps after graduation. He was killed in Vietnam in 1968. LeVell Hill accepted a football scholarship to Langston University. He briefly played for the Philadelphia Bell in the World Football League.

Broken Bow Memorial Stadium|Historic Broken Bow Memorial Stadium has served as the home of the Savages since it was constructed in the 1930s by the Works Progress Administration. Built primarily of concrete and native rock, Memorial Stadium is one of the oldest and largest high school football stadiums in the state of Oklahoma.

=== Band ===
For the past ten years, Broken Bow High School Band has received Superior Rating at the McAlester Regional Marching Contest and have placed in class 4A in every marching competition that they competed in this past season. The Band was originally known as the "Savage Pride" before it was changed in 2006 to the "Black and Gold Regiment."

== Notable people ==
- Harry Brecheen, former MLB pitcher for the St. Louis Cardinals
- James Butler, former sprinter, NCAA champion and 200 m winner at the Liberty Bell Classic
- Gail Davies, singer/songwriter with several top-10 country hits to her name.
- Randy Rutherford, former basketball player, most notable for his time as a college player for Oklahoma State

== Popular media ==
In 1951, author Snowden Miller published 'Gene Autry And The Badmen Of Broken Bow', featuring the famous Western film star of that name.

In "Broken Bow", the 2001 pilot episode of the television series Star Trek: Enterprise, Broken Bow was the site of Human–Klingon first contact in 2151. A messenger named Klaang was shot down by the Suliban over a corn field. Shortly after dispatching his enemies, Klaang was shot by a farmer named Moore. Although severely injured, Klaang survived.

Broken Bow and the surrounding area also served as the location for the episode "19:19" of the television series Millennium, in which Frank Black led a search for a group of children who had been abducted on their way to school. The abductor, a crazed visionary who believed he was the one destined to carry out the Book of Revelation's instructions, entombed the children in an abandoned quarry. This ultimately saved them from a deadly tornado that destroyed the schoolhouse where they otherwise would have been.

Broken Bow is a location in the 2010 film Leaves of Grass.

The 2026 true-crime-inspired movie Marrow, starring Michael Ironside and Danielle Harris, was shot in Broken Bow and Dallas.
