= Kiamichi Railroad =

Railway line in the United States

Overview
- Parent company: Genesee and Wyoming
- Headquarters: Hugo, Oklahoma
- Reporting mark: KRR
- Locale: Arkansas, Oklahoma, and Texas
- Dates of operation: 1987–present

Technical
- Track gauge: 4 ft 8 1/2 in (1,435 mm) standard gauge
- Length: 234 miles (377 km)

Other
- Website: Official website

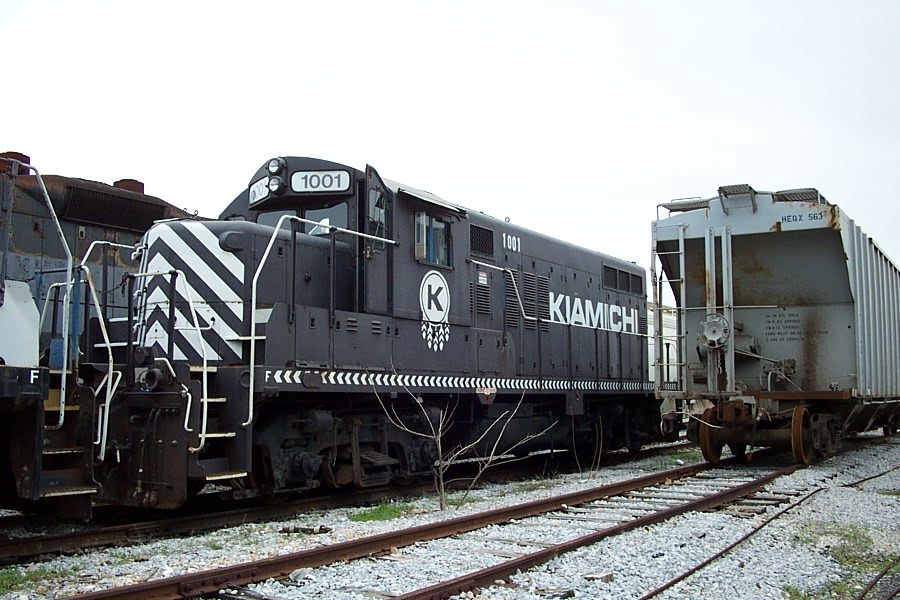
Kiamichi Railroad locomotive at the Eastern Alabama Railway yard in Sylacauga, Alabama. Notice that ditch lights are absent.

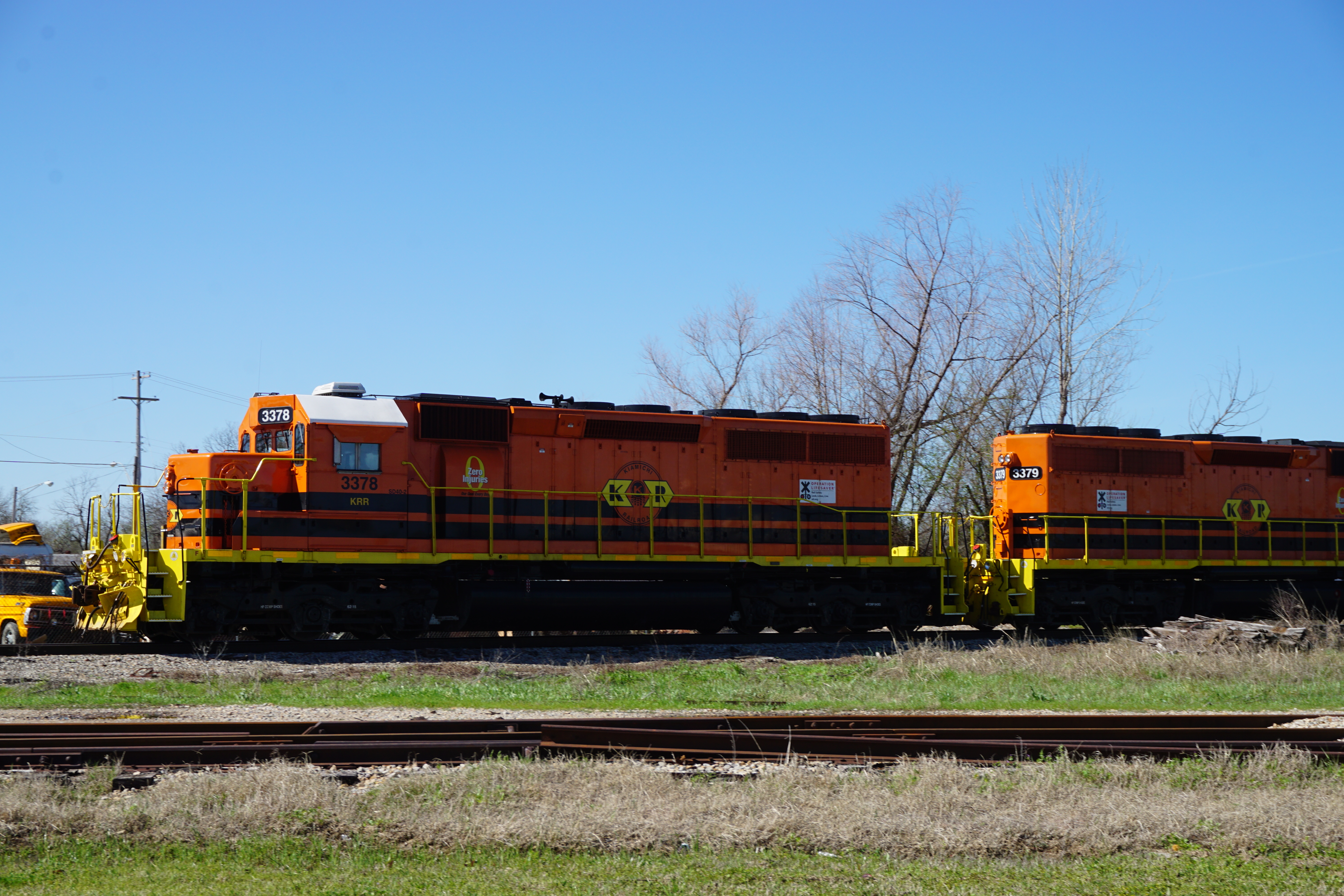
Kiamichi Railroad EMD SD40-2s #3378 and #3379 in Hugo, Oklahoma

The Kiamichi Railroad Company (reporting mark KRR) is a Class III short-line railroad headquartered in Hugo, Oklahoma.

KRR operates two lines totaling 234 miles (377 km) which intersect in Hugo, as well as maintaining trackage rights on an additional 45 miles (72 km) of track. The main line (186 miles) runs from Hope, Arkansas (where it interchanges with Union Pacific Railroad) to Lakeside, Oklahoma, then along 20 miles of BNSF Railway trackage rights to a BNSF interchange point at Madill, Oklahoma. Along this line, KRR interchanges with Union Pacific at Durant, Oklahoma, with Kansas City Southern Railway at Ashdown, Arkansas, and with De Queen and Eastern Railroad via Texas, Oklahoma and Eastern Railroad at Valliant, Oklahoma. Additionally, it interchanges with the shortline WFEC Railroad Company at Valliant, and is the Primary Operating Railroad on that line.

A 40-mile branch line runs from Antlers, Oklahoma through Hugo to Paris, Texas, although much of the trackage between Antlers and Hugo is no longer in service.

The line was a former main line of the Frisco railway; KRR started operations in 1987.

KRR traffic generally consists of coal, lumber, paper, glass, cement, pulpwood, stone and food products. The KRR hauled around 53,000 carloads in 2008.

KRR was purchased by RailAmerica, a short-line railroad holding company, in 2002. Another holding company, Genesee & Wyoming Inc., purchased RailAmerica in late 2012.

As of 2025, Genesee & Wyoming's Kiamichi Railroad holds a total of 234 miles (56 in Arkansas, 157 in Oklahoma, and 21 in Texas), has a maximum capacity of 263,000 in Antlers Branch (286,000 elsewhere). KRR has a few interchanges, as well: BNSF (Madill, Oklahoma); CPKC (Ashdown, Arkansas); Union Pacific (Durant, Oklahoma and Hope, Arkansas).

== ASLRRA Business Development Award ==
In 2018, due to increasing demand for poultry products, Tyson Foods desired to locate a new mill in Arkansas to be able to support the increase. Needing to receive unit trains to do so, Tyson searched for assistance with this project. Kiamichi Railroad offered Tyson flexibility within their properties for further development. Tyson began construction on the new mill in June 2020, with Kiamichi investing roughly $9 million in improvements that support the increase of demand. This includes over 180 miles of track with a capacity of 286k and the strengthening of more than 80 bridges. On May 10, 2022, the Kiamichi Railroad began a $65 million feed mill in McNab, Arkansas, as a multi-year project with Tyson Foods. As a result of this project, the Kiamichi Railroad was awarded the American Short Line and Regional Railroad Association (ASLRRA) Business Development Award in 2023.
