= Towson County, Choctaw Nation =

Choctaw Nation administrative division

Towson County was a political subdivision of the Choctaw Nation of Indian Territory, prior to Oklahoma being admitted as a state. The county formed part of the Nation's Apukshunnubbee a District, or Second District, one of three administrative super-regions.

== History ==
Towson County, Choctaw Nation was named for U.S. Army Col. Nathanial Towson (1784–1854), whose name was also commemorated by the territorial-era military post, Fort Towson, and by the present-day adjacent town of Fort Towson. The military post, established in 1824, was named first.

Towson County's boundaries were established and designated according to easily recognizable natural landmarks, as were the boundaries of all Choctaw Nation counties. The Red River formed its southern boundary; Little River was its eastern boundary; and the Kiamichi River was its western boundary. A line drawn to connect the Little and Kiamichi rivers formed its northern boundary.

Four counties bordered Towson County: Cedar County on the north, Bok Tuklo and Red River counties on the east, and Kiamitia County on the west. Its county seat was Towson Court House, a meeting ground which is no longer extant.

The county served as an election district for members of the National Council, and as a unit of local administration. Constitutional officers, all of whom served for two-year terms and were elected by the voters, included the county judge, sheriff, and a ranger. The judge's duties included oversight of overall county administration. The sheriff collected taxes, monitored unlawful intrusion by intruders (usually white Americans from the United States), and conducted the census. The county ranger advertised and sold strayed livestock.

== Statehood ==
As Oklahoma's statehood approached, its leading citizens, who were gathered for the Oklahoma Constitutional Convention, realized in laying out the future state's counties that, while logically designed, the Choctaw Nation's counties could not exist as economically viable political subdivisions. In most the county seat existed generally for holding county court and not as a population center.

This conundrum was also recognized by the framers of the proposed State of Sequoyah, who met in 1905 to propose statehood for the Indian Territory. The Sequoyah Constitutional Convention also proposed a county structure that abolished the Choctaw counties. Towson County was included principally within the territory of the proposed Hitchcock County.

Much of this proposition was borrowed two years later by Oklahoma's framers, who adopted certain of these concepts for the future Choctaw County in Oklahoma. The territory formerly comprising Towson County, Choctaw Nation was divided almost equally between Choctaw County and McCurtain County.

Towson County ceased to exist upon Oklahoma’s statehood on November 16, 1907.
