= WFEC Railroad Company =

US industrial rail line

Overview
- Headquarters: Hugo, Oklahoma
- Reporting mark: WFEC
- Locale: Oklahoma
- Dates of operation: 1997–present

Technical
- Track gauge: 4 ft 8 1/2 in (1,435 mm) standard gauge
- Length: 14.98 miles (24.11 km)

WFEC Railroad Company-- reporting mark: WFEC-- is a Class III industrial rail line running 14.98 miles from Western Farmers Electric Cooperative's Hugo Power Plant at Fort Towson, Oklahoma, near Hugo, to an interchange with the Texas, Oklahoma and Eastern Railroad (TOE) at Valliant, Oklahoma. It is owned by Western Farmers, and was built in 1997.

== History ==
The coal-fired Hugo Power Plant was completed in 1982, and was equipped with six miles of rail line and 330 rail cars. The plant got Wyoming coal at Fort Towson from the Kiamichi Railroad through that line's interchange with the Burlington Northern. WFEC came about pursuant to a 1997 agreement among WFEC, Western Farmers, TOE, the Union Pacific (UP), and Kansas City Southern (KCS), which provided for WFEC to construct the 14+ mile line from the plant to TOE's tracks at Valliant. This allowed UP to ship coal to the KCS at Kansas City, which in turn would send it to TOE's affiliate at DeQueen, Arkansas, for delivery by TOE to WFEC at Valliant, resulting in an anticipated cost savings.

In 2002, Kiamichi, which also connects at Valliant, gained overhead trackage rights to utilize the entire WFEC line to service the Hugo Power Plant, and in 2012 those rights were expanded to include providing service to any other Western Farmers’ facilities located on or adjacent to the Line, or which may locate on or adjacent to the Line. The State of Oklahoma has noted that Kiamichi is now the Primary Operating Railroad on WFEC's line.
