= Cedar Creek Golf Course at Beavers Bend =

Coordinates: 34°12′19″N 94°43′53″W

Cedar Creek Golf Course at Beavers Bend (also known simply as Cedar Creek) is a public golf course on the shores of Broken Bow Lake, about nine miles north of the city of Broken Bow, Oklahoma. The course has eighteen holes with a par of 72, and offers champion Bermuda grass greens, Bermuda grass tees and fairways, putting green, driving range, and a pro shop with cart and club rentals, snacks and drinks.

== Praise ==
Cedar Creek Golf Course at Beavers Bend was rated four stars by Golf Digest Magazine as "Places to Play 2002."
