= Nancy Branch =

Stream in Polk County, Arkansas, U.S.

Nancy Branch is a stream in Polk County, Arkansas, United States. Its headwaters arise at 34°30′30.38″N 94°21′44.77″W and it flows to the northwest and enters Mountain Fork approximately 2.8 miles to the northwest of Hatfield and ten miles southwest of Mena at 34°31′27.38″N 94°23′53.77″W. The stream confluence has an elevation of 840 feet (260 m).
