= Nashoba County, Indian Territory =

Nashoba County (Choctaw: Kanti Nashoba) was a political subdivision of the Choctaw Nation of Indian Territory. The county formed part of the Nation’s Apukshunnubbee District, or Second District, one of three administrative super-regions in the Nation. This territory was later made part of the state of Oklahoma.

== History ==
Nashoba County, Choctaw Nation was named for Neshoba County, Mississippi, where some of the Choctaw had historically lived. Nashoba is the Choctaw word for “wolf.” Although occasionally known as Wolf County, the county was generally referred to by its Choctaw name. Due to an agreement among clan chiefs prior to the removal to the west now known as the Trail of Tears, many of the residents of Neshoba County settled in the new Nashoba County in the Choctaw Nation after they reached Indian Territory.

Nashoba County’s boundaries were established and designated according to easily recognizable natural landmarks, as were the boundaries of all Choctaw Nation counties. The Kiamichi River valley formed its northern boundary and Little River formed its western boundary. Arkansas (admitted as a state in 1836) was to its east, and its southern border was along a line drawn from Arkansas to Little River on the west. Although the act of legislation establishing Nashoba County does not reference it, the southern border appears to have been drawn to be coextensive with the Seven Devils Mountains. This general line of seven mountain peaks appears on early-day maps and in early accounts. The Seven Devils were considered to be a formidable geographic barrier.

Four counties bordered Nashoba County: Wade County on the north, Cedar County on the west, and Bok Tuklo and Eagle counties on the south. Its county seat was Nashoba Court House, a meeting ground which is no longer extant. It was located in present-day McCurtain County. The county was the site of Alikchi, designated as the capital of the Apukshunnubbee District. This was one of three administrative super-regions comprising the Choctaw Nation, of which Nashoba County was a constituent county. Present-day Rattan developed to the west of Alikchi, which is no longer extant.

The county served as an election district for members of the National Council, and as a unit of local administration. Constitutional officers, all of whom served for two-year terms and were elected by the voters, included the county judge, sheriff, and a ranger. The judge’s duties included oversight of overall county administration. The sheriff collected taxes, monitored unlawful intrusion by intruders (usually white Americans from the United States), and conducted the census. The county ranger advertised and sold strayed livestock.

== Statehood ==
As Oklahoma’s statehood approached, its leading citizens gathered for the Oklahoma Constitutional Convention, and to lay out the future state’s counties. The Choctaw Nation’s counties had been logically designed for their purposes, but convention members concluded these could not exist as economically viable political subdivisions. In most, the county seat had been established for conducting county court, but they had not developed as population centers.

This conundrum was also recognized by the framers of the proposed State of Sequoyah. They had met in 1905 to propose statehood for the Indian Territory, as a jurisdiction to be controlled by Native Americans. The Sequoyah Constitutional Convention also proposed a county structure that abolished the Choctaw counties. Nashoba County was to be divided principally into the proposed Pushmataha County, McCurtain, and Wade counties.

Two years later, the state of Oklahoma’s framers adopted certain of the concepts proposed for the definition of the future McCurtain and Pushmataha counties in Oklahoma. The territory formerly comprising Nashoba County, Choctaw Nation now falls primarily within McCurtain and Pushmataha counties.

Nashoba County ceased to exist upon Oklahoma’s admission to statehood on November 16, 1907.
