= Valliant, Oklahoma =

- Town
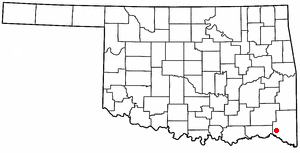
- Location in Oklahoma
- Coordinates: 34°00′21″N 95°05′10″W
- Country: United States
- State: Oklahoma
- County: McCurtain

Area
  - Total: 1.93 sq mi (5.01 km^{2})
  - Land: 1.93 sq mi (5.00 km^{2})
  - Water: 0.0077 sq mi (0.02 km^{2})
- Elevation: 525 ft (160 m)

Population (2020)
  - Total: 819
  - Density: 424.5/sq mi (163.91/km^{2})
- Time zone: UTC-6 (Central (CST))
  - Summer (DST): UTC-5 (CDT)
- ZIP Code: 74764
- Area code: 580
- FIPS code: 40-76650
- GNIS feature ID: 2413421
- Website: www.valliant.municipalgovt.org

Valliant is a town in McCurtain County, Oklahoma, United States. The population was 819 at the 2020 census, up from 754 in 2010.

== History ==
Valliant was founded June 2, 1902, in what was the Choctaw Nation, Indian Territory, and named for Frank W. Valliant, a chief divisional engineer for the Arkansas and Choctaw Railway then being constructed in the area. At the time of its founding, Valliant was located in Towson County, a part of the Apukshunnubbee District, one of three administrative super-regions comprising the Choctaw Nation.

A cotton gin opened in 1903, and continued operation until the 1930s. In 1904, the town incorporated and elected its first mayor. A newspaper began publishing in 1905. By 1920, the community had two banks, three hotels and nearly 20 other businesses.

Dierks Forests, Inc., known until 1954 as the Dierks Lumber and Coal Company and originally known as Choctaw Lumber Co., was a timber harvesting and processing company primarily in Oklahoma and Arkansas which started with a purchase of forest in 1903 near Valliant. The company grew to own 1.75 million acres of timberland, making it one of the largest family-owned landholding entities in the United States before it was sold to the Weyerhaeuser Company in 1969.

Pine Creek Dam was built nearby in the 1960s to control flooding along the stream. Pine Creek Lake and the Pine Creek Wildlife Management Area, 8 miles (13 km) north of town, have attracted vacationers.

== Geography ==
The town is located in southwestern McCurtain County on U.S. Route 70, 3 miles (5 km) from the Choctaw - McCurtin county line. It is 6 miles (10 km) north of the Red River and the Oklahoma-Texas state line. Idabel is 18 miles (29 km) southeast on Route 70, and Hugo is 25 miles (40 km) to the west.

According to the U.S. Census Bureau, the town of Valliant has an area of 1.94 square miles (5.02 km^{2}), of which 0.01 square miles (0.03 km^{2}), or 0.31%, are water. The town sits on high ground which drains south toward Garland Creek, a direct tributary of the Red River, and north Sand Springs Branch and Little White Oak Creek, tributaries of the Little River, itself part of the Red River watershed.

== Demographics ==
Historical population
Census	Pop.	Note	%±
1910	656		—
1920	809		23.3%
1930	608		−24.8%
1940	551		−9.4%
1950	661		20.0%
1960	477		−27.8%
1970	840		76.1%
1980	927		10.4%
1990	873		−5.8%
2000	769		−11.9%
2010	754		−2.0%
2020	819		8.6%
U.S. Decennial Census

=== 2020 census ===
As of the 2020 census, Valliant had a population of 819. The median age was 40.8 years. 23.4% of residents were under the age of 18 and 22.1% of residents were 65 years of age or older. For every 100 females there were 73.5 males, and for every 100 females age 18 and over there were 65.4 males age 18 and over.

0.0% of residents lived in urban areas, while 100.0% lived in rural areas.

There were 319 households in Valliant, of which 33.2% had children under the age of 18 living in them. Of all households, 37.0% were married-couple households, 17.6% were households with a male householder and no spouse or partner present, and 38.6% were households with a female householder and no spouse or partner present. About 31.7% of all households were made up of individuals and 15.0% had someone living alone who was 65 years of age or older.

There were 373 housing units, of which 14.5% were vacant. The homeowner vacancy rate was 7.1% and the rental vacancy rate was 11.8%.

Racial composition as of the 2020 census
Race	Number	Percent
White	513	62.6%
Black or African American	104	12.7%
American Indian and Alaska Native	103	12.6%
Asian	4	0.5%
Native Hawaiian and Other Pacific Islander	0	0.0%
Some other race	13	1.6%
Two or more races	82	10.0%
Hispanic or Latino (of any race)	22	2.7%

=== 2000 census ===
According to the census of 2000, Valliant residents included 771 people, 315 households, and 194 families residing in the town. The population density was 1,023.8 inhabitants per square mile (395.3/km^{2}). There were 351 housing units at an average density of 466.1 per square mile (180.0/km^{2}). The racial makeup of the town was 75.49% White, 9.21% African American, 10.77% Native American, 0.52% from other races, and 4.02% from two or more races. Hispanic or Latino of any race were 0.91% of the population.

There were 315 households, out of which 31.4% had children under the age of 18 living with them, 39.0% were married couples living together, 21.0% had a female householder with no husband present, and 38.4% were non-families. 35.2% of all households were made up of individuals, and 18.1% had someone living alone who was 65 years of age or older. The average household size was 2.30 and the average family size was 3.00.

In the town, the population was spread out, with 26.5% under the age of 18, 10.2% from 18 to 24, 23.2% from 25 to 44, 18.0% from 45 to 64, and 22.0% who were 65 years of age or older. The median age was 39 years. For every 100 females, there were 74.8 males. For every 100 females age 18 and over, there were 64.3 males.

The median income for a household in the town was $18,393, and the median income for a family was $26,058. Males had a median income of $24,125 versus $17,344 for females. The per capita income for the town was $10,380. About 24.3% of families and 31.7% of the population were below the poverty line, including 35.2% of those under age 18 and 28.2% of those age 65 or over.

== Economy ==
The economic base of the town has been agriculture. Early-day crops were cotton and grains. Cotton began to decline after 1930, so the land was shifted into pasture and forage for feeding cattle. Forest products became important in the 1970s, when Weyerhaeuser Co., a paper products company opened a paperboard plant and a paper mill, making it the largest employer in town. (Note: Weyerhaeuser then had 350 production workers and 150 support workers before the company announcing that it would close one of its three paper machines indefinitely. It also sold its container board packaging and recycling business to International Paper. That included the Valiant mill.)

== Transportation ==
Valliant is served by US Route 70 and Old State Highway 98, a prior alignment of the current Oklahoma State Highway 98.

The town is a rail connection point, with the Texas, Oklahoma and Eastern Railroad, Kiamichi Railroad, and WFEC Railroad all having interchange points at the location.

McCurtain County Regional Airport (FAA ID: 4o4) is about 17 miles (27 km) southeast and features a 5,002-by-75-foot (1,525 by 23 m) paved runway. Commercial air service is available out of Texarkana Regional Airport, about 92 miles (148 km) southeast.

== Education ==
It is in the Valliant Public Schools school district.
