= Mountain Fork =

River in Oklahoma and Arkansas, United States

Mountain Fork Mountain Fork of the Little River
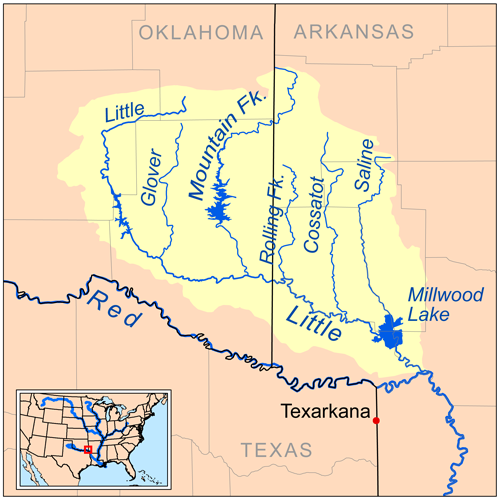
- Map of the Little River watershed showing the Mountain Fork

Physical characteristics
- Source
  - location: Ouachita Mountains, Oklahoma
- Mouth: Little River
  - location: McCurtain County, Oklahoma
  - coordinates: 33°57′05″N 94°34′32″W
- Length: 98 mi (158 km)
- Discharge
  - location: Eagletown, Oklahoma
  - average: 1,430 cubic feet per second (40 cubic metres per second)

Mountain Fork, also known as the Mountain Fork of the Little River, is a 98-mile-long (158 km) tributary of the Little River in western Arkansas and southeastern Oklahoma in the United States. Via the Little and Red rivers, it is part of the watershed of the Mississippi River. The stream rises in the Ouachita Mountains. Broken Bow Lake is an artificial lake along the course of the Mountain Fork. The stream is known for canoeing, kayaking, and sport fishing, including for stocked trout.

== Course ==
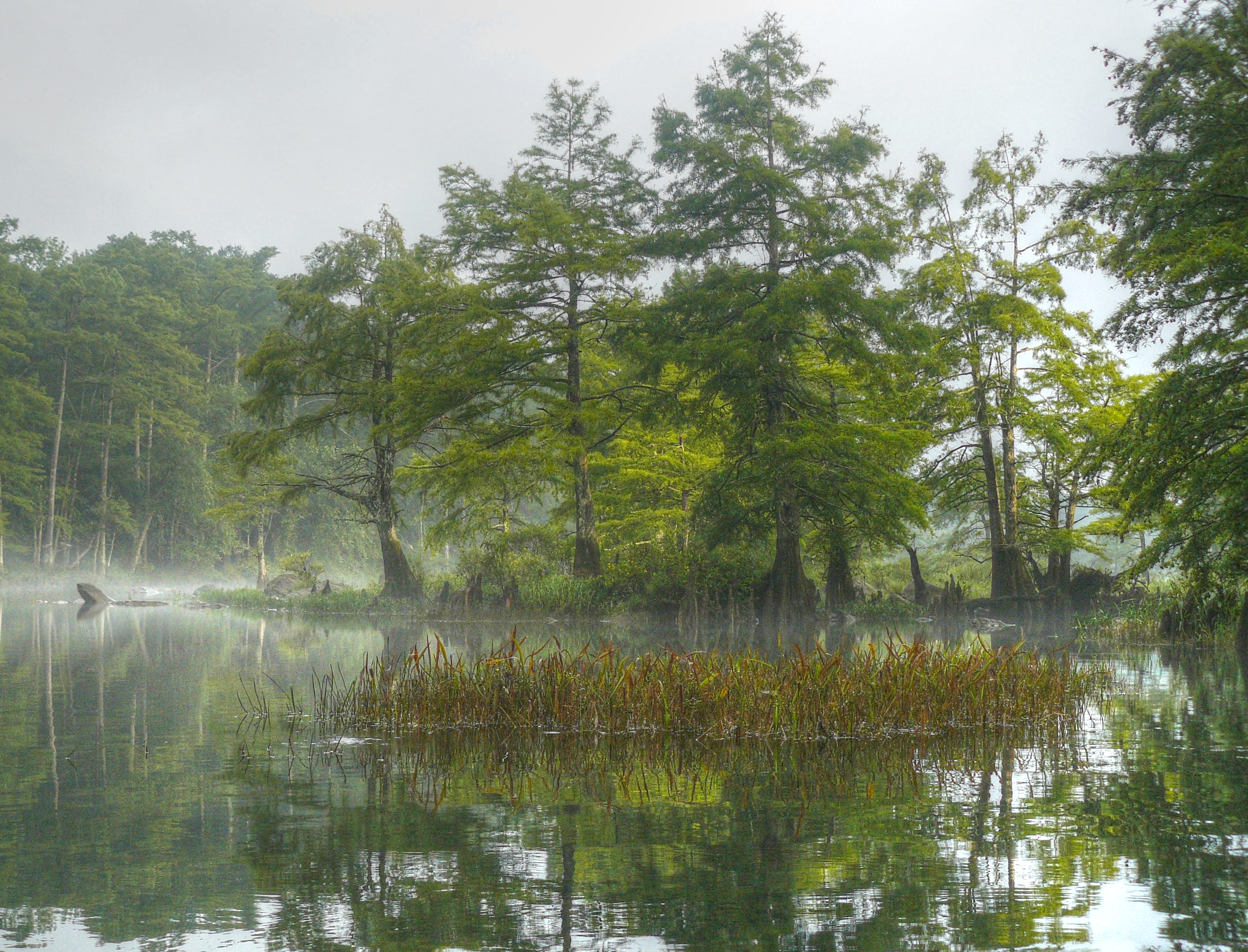
Bald Cypress trees often line the lower Mountain Fork.

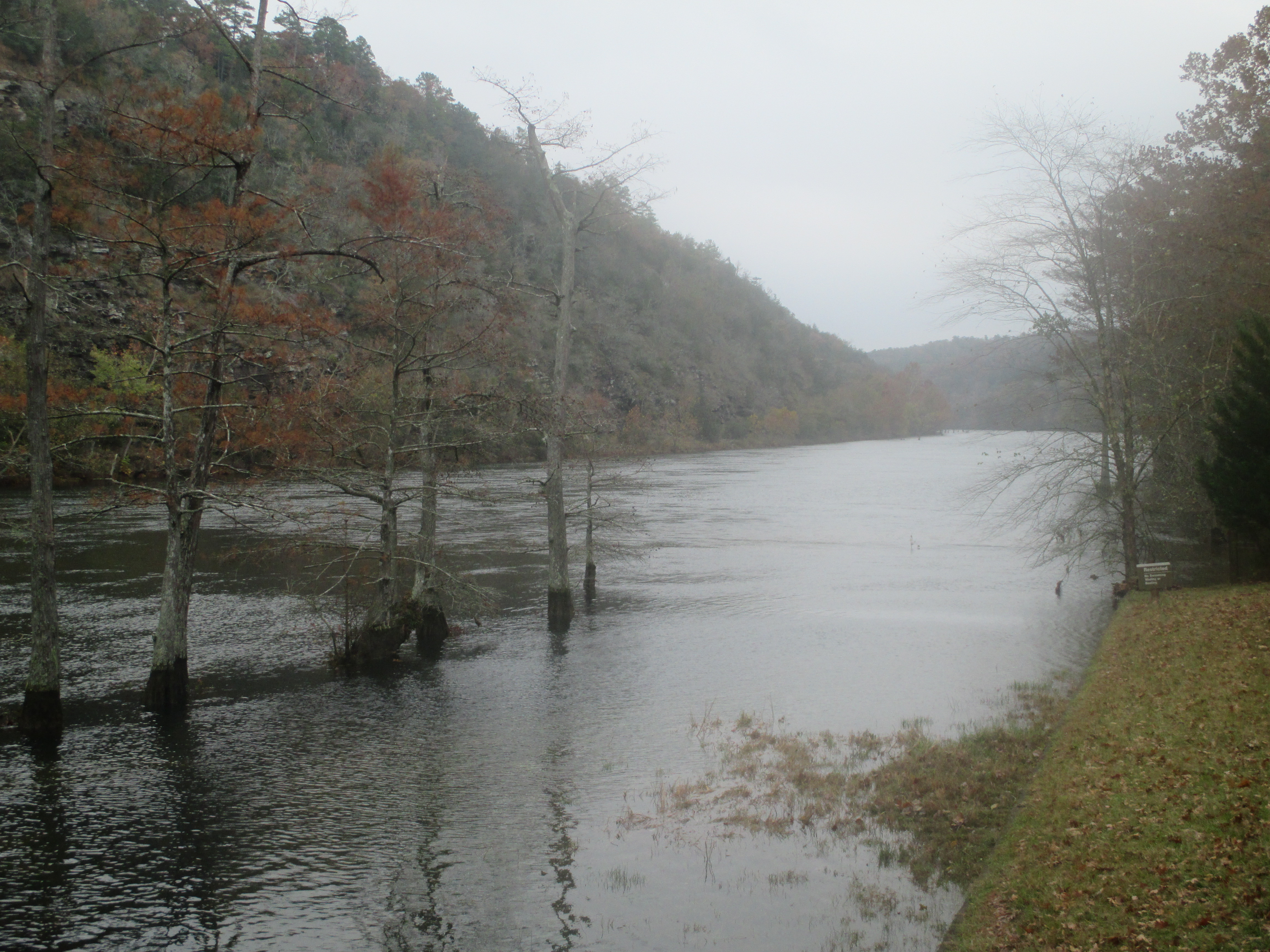
The Mountain Fork in McCurtain County, Oklahoma

The Mountain Fork rises in the Ouachita Mountains in Le Flore County, Oklahoma, and then flows southeastwardly into Polk County, Arkansas, then southwestwardly into McCurtain County, Oklahoma, where it turns southward for the remainder of its course. It joins the Little River in McCurtain County, 10 miles (16 km) southeast of Broken Bow.

In its upper course, the river flows through a portion of the Ouachita National Forest. In McCurtain County, the river is dammed to form Broken Bow Lake. Nancy Branch is a tributary of the river.

== Discharge ==
At Eagletown, the river has a mean annual discharge of 1,430 cubic feet per second (40 cubic metres per second).

== Recreation and conservation ==
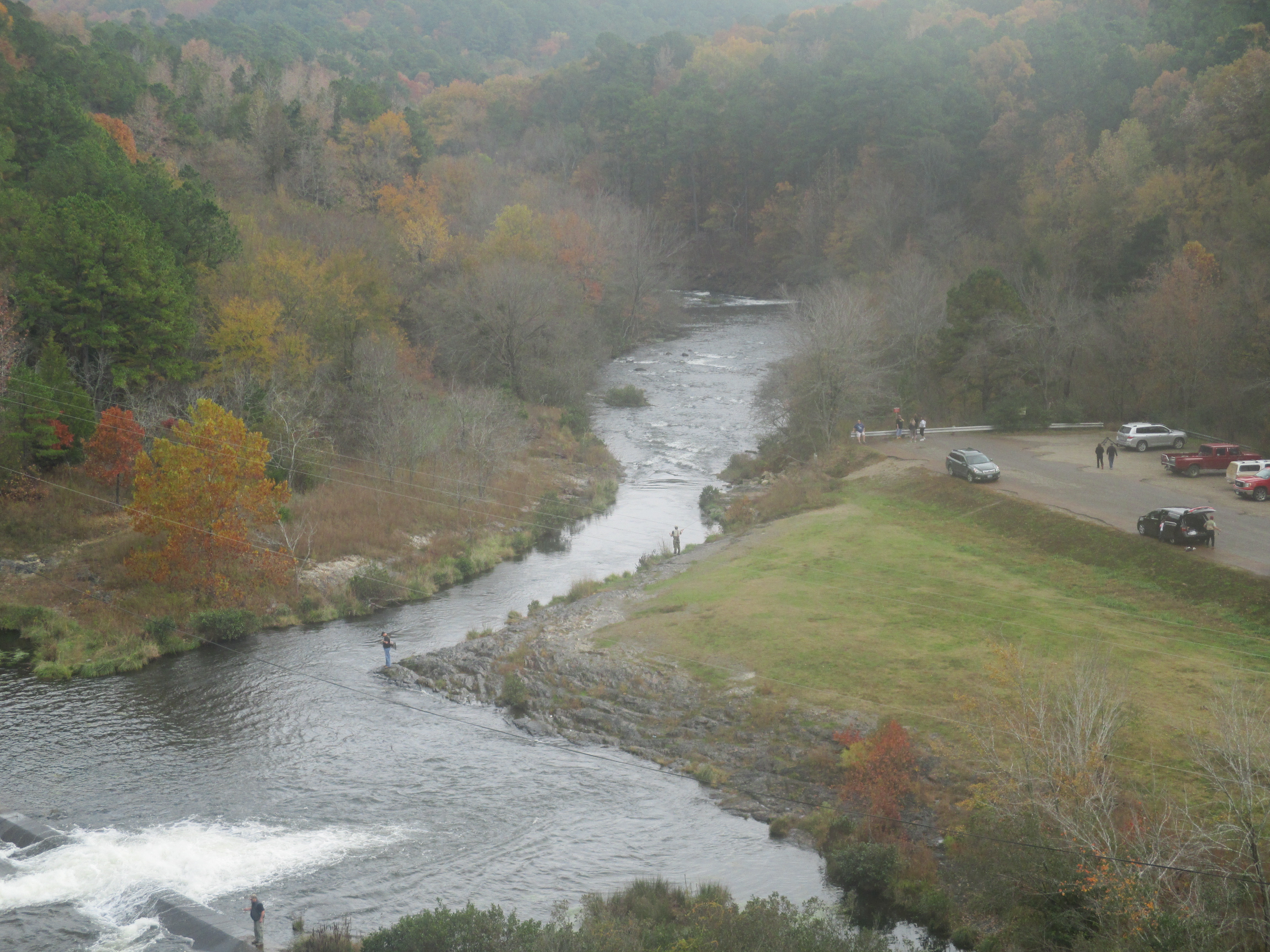
Trout fishermen below the spillway of Broken Bow Lake.

The Upper Mountain Fork River offers 31.7 miles (51.0 km) of canoeing or kayaking from near Hatfield, Arkansas to Broken Bow Lake. This part of the river has class I and II rapids. clear water, fishing for smallmouth bass and other species, and excellent scenery with pine forests covering the hills and bluffs along the river's course. Water levels in the river are generally adequate for boating year-round. On the upper portion of Broken Bow Lake is the McCurtain County Wilderness Area, an Oklahoma State-owned 14,000 acres (5,700 ha) tract which contains the largest remaining virgin shortleaf pine/hardwood forest in the nation. Hunting is permitted in the wilderness area.

Below Broken Bow dam and lake, the 18.8 miles (30.3 km) of the Lower Mountain Fork is described as the "consistently flowing and best whitewater stream" in Oklahoma. Class I and II rapids are found in the upper part of this section and paddlers must navigate waterfalls with a four feet (1.2 meters) drop. Bald cypress trees line and, in some places, grow in the river. The cool waters issuing below Broken Bow dam provide year-round habitat and fishing for rainbow and brown trout which are stocked regularly throughout the year. In 2008, a 17-pound-4-ounce (7.8-kilogram) brown trout was caught by an angler in the Mountain Fork.

== See also ==
- List of Arkansas rivers
- List of Oklahoma rivers

== See also ==
- Columbia Gazetteer of North America
- DeLorme (2004). Arkansas Atlas & Gazetteer. Yarmouth, Maine: DeLorme. ISBN 0-89933-345-1.
- DeLorme (2003). Oklahoma Atlas & Gazetteer. Yarmouth, Maine: DeLorme. ISBN 0-89933-283-8.
- U.S. Geological Survey Geographic Names Information System: Mountain Fork
