= Dierks Forests =

American timber company

Dierks Forests, Inc.
- Formerly: Choctaw Lumber Co. (original); Dierks Lumber and Coal Company (until 1954)
- Type: Formerly Family-owned
- Industry: Timber harvesting and processing
- Predecessor: Choctaw Lumber Co.
- Founded: 1903
- Founder: Dierks brothers (Herman, Fred, Hans)
- Fate: Acquired by Weyerhaeuser Company
- Area served: Oklahoma, Arkansas
- Products: Lumber, coal (formerly)
- Services: Timber harvesting and processing
- Owner: Dierks family (until 1969)
- Subsidiaries: Texas, Oklahoma and Eastern Railroad

Dierks Forests, Inc., known until 1954 as the Dierks Lumber and Coal Company and originally known as Choctaw Lumber Co., was a timber harvesting and processing company primarily in Oklahoma and Arkansas. Starting with a purchase of forest in 1903 in the Indian Territory, near Valliant, the company became known for its concept of the “traveling timber town”, in which the houses, the school, the church, and other buildings for the workers and their families were moved periodically to stay close to the advancing logging site. The company eventually owned 1.75 million acres of timberland, and was one of the largest family-owned landholding entities in the United States before it was sold to the Weyerhaeuser Company in 1969.

== History ==
The Dierks family's lumber business originated in the 1880s in Iowa and Nebraska. In 1895, brothers Hans, Herman, Henry and Peter Dierks incorporated the Dierks Lumber and Coal Company. The business expanded southward around the turn of the century, purchasing the Williamson Brothers sawmill in De Queen, Arkansas, in 1900 and subsequently acquiring large areas of timberland in Arkansas and what became Oklahoma.

The company changed its name to Dierks Forests, Inc. in 1954 and diversified beyond lumber into products including paper, fiberboard, pressure-treated wood and gypsum wallboard. Its headquarters moved from Kansas City, Missouri, to Hot Springs, Arkansas, in 1956. By this period, the company controlled approximately 1.75 million acres of timberland. In 1969, Weyerhaeuser acquired Dierks Forests for $317 million; the transaction included the company's timberland, paper mill, three sawmills, treating plant, other manufacturing operations and two railroads.

== Legacy ==
One of the Dierks timber-hauling steam locomotives, a 1917 oil-burning Baldwin 2-6-2 Prairie-type, was donated to the City of Tulsa, Oklahoma after its retirement, and has been standing since 1983 in front of the west parking lot for the Tulsa Fairgrounds. That engine had “DIERKS FOREST” painted on the cab, while “207” was painted on the tender and on one of the locomotive domes. When the engine was repainted around 2011 or 2012, the lettering was lost. However, the locomotive was repainted again by June of 2024 with the lettering restored, and with the hope additional funds could be found to make the engine operative once more.

Another locomotive, the Dierks Forest 360, is an oil-burning 4-6-0 ten-wheeler built in 1920 and originally run by a Dierks subsidiary, the Texas, Oklahoma and Eastern Railroad. The engine is currently on display in Queen Wilhelmina State Park.

The town of Dierks, Arkansas was named for Hans Dierks, the oldest of the four Dierks brothers associated with the company.

The city of Broken Bow, Oklahoma started as a private development by a subsidiary of the Choctaw Lumber Company. The Dierks sawmill in town was one of the largest mills in the United States. The name of the town came about from Broken Bow, Nebraska, the previous home of founders Herman and Fred Dierks. The Dierks family donated land for public uses, including churches and schools, and a Dierks Elementary School continues in the city to this day. The town also continues to have a Dierks Street. Dierks locomotive #227 remains preserved in Broken Bow. It is an oil-fired Baldwin 2-8-2 Mikado which was built in May 1927, operated until 1963 when it was replaced by a diesel locomotive, and donated in 1972 to the City of Broken Bow.
