= Apukshunnubbee District =

Apukshunnubbee District was one of three provinces, or districts, comprising the former Choctaw Nation in Indian Territory. Also called the Second District, it encompassed the southeastern one-third of the nation.

The Apukshunnubbee District was named in honor of Chief Apukshunnubbee (also spelled Apuckshunubbee), a Choctaw warrior and statesman. He was district chief of the Okla Falaya ("Upper Towns") District in the original Choctaw Nation of the Southeast. Many Choctaw from that area referred to the Apukshunnubbee District as the Okla Falaya District. The other two districts were the Moshulatubbee District and Pushmataha District.

== History ==
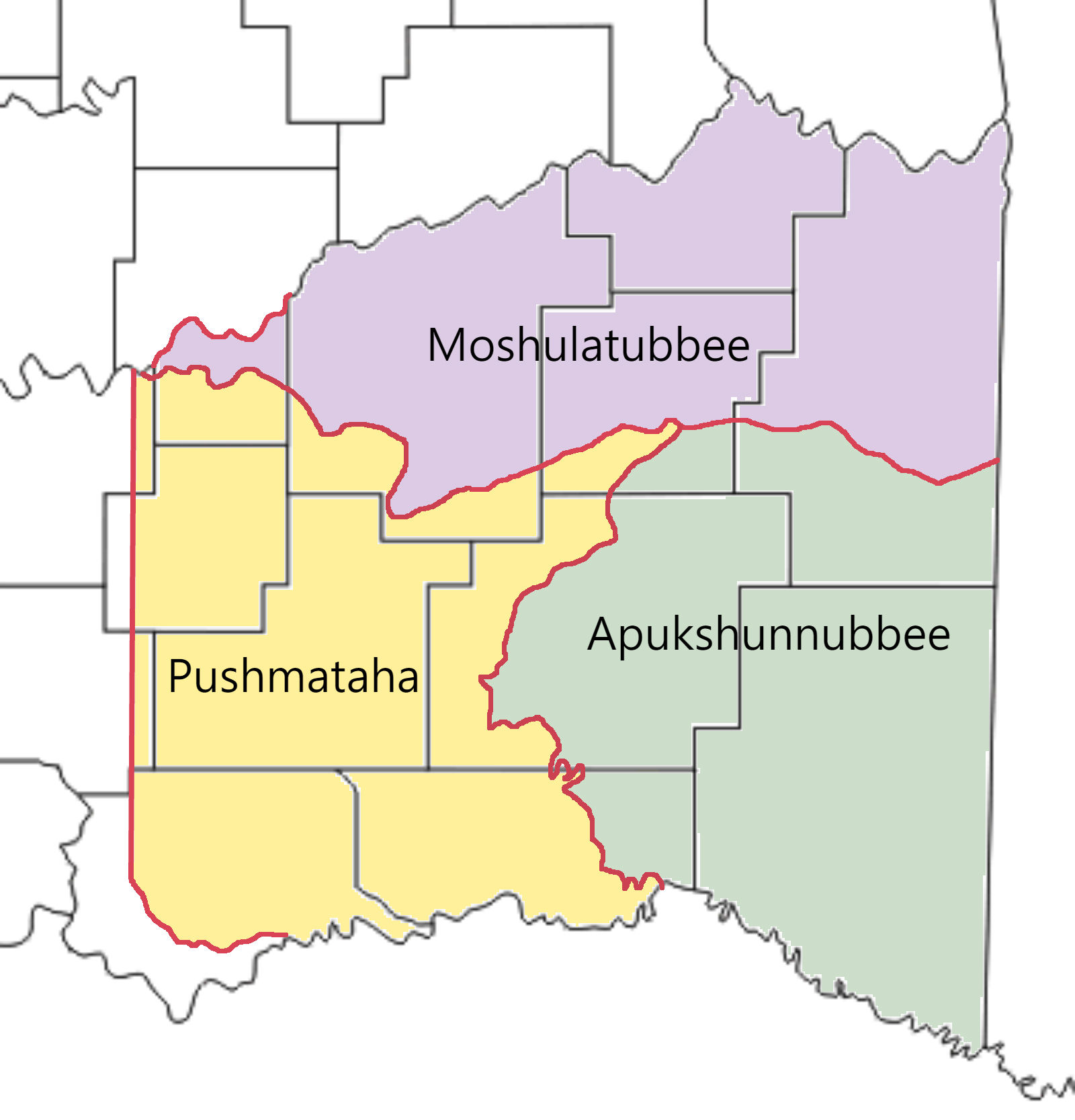
Apukshunnubbee District covered the southeastern one-third of the Choctaw Nation.

The districts were established when the Choctaw Nation relocated via the Trail of Tears to the Indian Territory—present-day Oklahoma. They were originally intended to be homelands for settlers from the three major clans or divisions of the Choctaw comprising the nation. In practice, the clan affiliations and allegiances rapidly became less important after the Choctaw reached Indian Territory. The districts’ importance in the political life of the nation, which earlier had reflected geographic settlement and development, waned over time.

The three district chiefs lost power and authority to the principal chief of the nation. Eventually the principal chief became, simply, the chief. No longer a “first among equals”, he became the sole political leader.

In judicial jurisdiction, the three districts and their seats of government retained their historic influence. Crimes and criminals not tried at the county level were bucked to the district level automatically. Court days were the busiest days of the year in the district seats of government.

Apukshunnubbee District's administrative seat of government was Alikchi, in Nashoba County, Choctaw Nation. Alikchi is located east of present-day Rattan, Oklahoma and north of Wright City, Oklahoma, in McCurtain County.

Included in the Apukshunnubbee District were the Choctaw Nation counties of Bok Tuklo, Cedar, Eagle, Nashoba, Red River, Towson and Wade.

As Oklahoma's statehood loomed, the Apukshunnubbee District, and its constituent counties, slowly wound down their governmental functions. The United States courts in the Indian Territory usurped their powers. On November 16, 1907—Oklahoma's Statehood Day—the district and its counties disappeared forever.

The territory of the former Apukshunnubbee District is incorporated principally into the present-day Oklahoma counties of Choctaw, Le Flore, McCurtain, and Pushmataha.
