= Sequoyah Constitutional Convention =

Constitutional convention that took place in Indian Territory

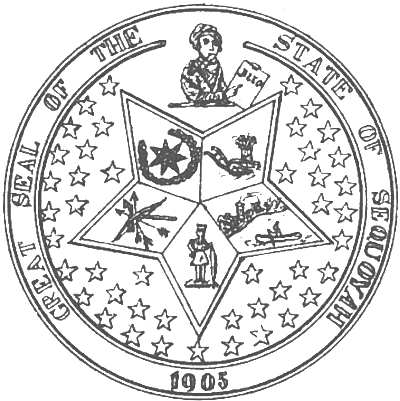
- Proposed seal of the State of Sequoyah
- Date: August 21 to September 8, 1905
- Location: Muscogee, Indian Territory North America
- Participants: see below
- Outcome: Created Sequoyah Constitution

The Sequoyah Constitutional Convention was an American Indian-led attempt to secure statehood for Indian Territory as an Indian-controlled jurisdiction, separate from the Oklahoma Territory. The proposed state was to be called the State of Sequoyah.

The convention drafted a constitution, drew up a plan of organization for the government, put together a map showing the counties to be established, and elected delegates to go to the United States Congress to petition for statehood. The convention's proposals were put to a referendum in Indian Territory, and received overwhelming endorsement by voters. However, the delegation received a cool reception in Washington, D.C., due to party politics, and failed to secure its goals.

Although unsuccessful, the convention led to the creation of the U.S. state of Oklahoma.

== Background ==
The Five Civilized Tribes and other tribes in Indian territory were generally opposed to local and national efforts for statehood. As mandated by the 1898 Curtis Act, however, United States recognition of tribal governments were to end March 4, 1906, as part of a federal push toward assimilation of Native Americans.

James A. Norman (Cherokee) promoted a constitutional convention to organize an American Indian state. In a 1904 pamphlet he suggested naming the state "Sequoyah" to honor the Cherokee who had developed the Cherokee syllabary, the first independently created written form of an indigenous language in North America. In July 1905, William Charles Rogers, principal chief of the Cherokee Nation, and Green McCurtain, principal chief of the Choctaw Nation issued a call for a convention. The call was amended in late July to add the names of Pleasant Porter and principal chief of the Creek Nation, John Brown principal chief of the Seminoles. Douglas Johnston, Governor of the Chickasaw Nation, opposed calling the convention, so his nation was represented by William H. Murray.

== Convention ==
Sequoyah constitutional referendum, 1905
- November 7, 1905; 120 years ago
- Voting system: Plurality

Results
| Statehood | 86.11% |
| Territory | 13.88% |

The convention met in the Hinton Theater in Muskogee, on August 21, 1905.

The convention drafted a constitution, drew up a plan of organization for the government, put together a map showing the counties to be established, and elected delegates to go to the United States Congress to petition for statehood. The convention's proposals were put to a referendum in Indian Territory, and received overwhelming endorsement by voters.

The delegation received a cool reception in Washington, D.C., due to party politics. Indian Territory was bordered by two southern Democratic states. The U.S. President, Theodore Roosevelt, was a Republican, and the Republican-controlled Congress wanted joint statehood of the two territories to eliminate the possibility of the territory joining the Union as a Democratic state. On June 16, 1906, President Roosevelt signed the Oklahoma Enabling Act, which ruled that the Indian and Oklahoma territories would be granted statehood only as a combined state.

The convention succeeded in winning approval of a 35,000 word document that would govern the proposed state. It captured a Populist distrust of elected officials. It also assured that several residents of Indian Territory would serve in prominent positions both in the Oklahoma Constitutional Convention and in the forthcoming state that would ensue.

The work of the Sequoyah State Constitutional Convention was not entirely lost. When representatives from Indian Territory joined the Oklahoma State Constitutional Convention in Guthrie the next year, they brought their experience with them. The Sequoyah Constitution served in large part as the basis for the constitution of the State of Oklahoma, which came into being with the merger of the two territories in 1907.

General Pleasant Porter, Principal Chief of the Muscogee Creek Nation, was selected as president of the convention. The elected delegates decided to appoint the executive officers of the Five Civilized Tribes as vice-presidents of the convention: William Charles Rogers, Principal Chief of the Cherokees; William H. Murray, appointed by Chickasaw Governor Douglas H. Johnston to represent the Chickasaws; Chief Green McCurtain of the Choctaws; Chief John Brown of the Seminoles; and Charles N. Haskell, selected to represent the Muscogee people (as General Porter had been elected President).

== List of prominent delegates ==
- William H. Murray (Constitutional Convention President, ninth Governor of Oklahoma, first Speaker of the Oklahoma House of Representatives)
- Charles N. Haskell (first Governor of Oklahoma)
- Robert L. Williams (third Governor of Oklahoma, first Chief Justice of Oklahoma)
- Henry S. Johnston (Constitution Convention President Pro Tempore, seventh Governor of Oklahoma, first President pro tempore of the Oklahoma Senate)
- Pete Hanraty (Constitution Convention Vice President)
- Albert H. Ellis (Constitutional Convention Second Vice President)
- Charles M. McClain (Constitutional Convention Secretary)
- Charles H. Filson (Secretary of Oklahoma)

== See also ==
- Four Mothers Society
- Government of Oklahoma
- Oklahoma Legislature
- Oklahoma Supreme Court
- Politics of Oklahoma
