= Honobia, Oklahoma =

Unincorporated community in Oklahoma, US

Coordinates: 34°32′20″N 94°56′15″W

Honobia (Choctaw: Nochonohonubbe) is an unincorporated community on the border between western LeFlore County and eastern Pushmataha County, Oklahoma, United States, 15 miles southeast of Talihina.

== History ==
A United States Post Office was established here on August 30, 1919. Located on the county line of Pushmataha County, the post office has at times operated in Pushmataha County.

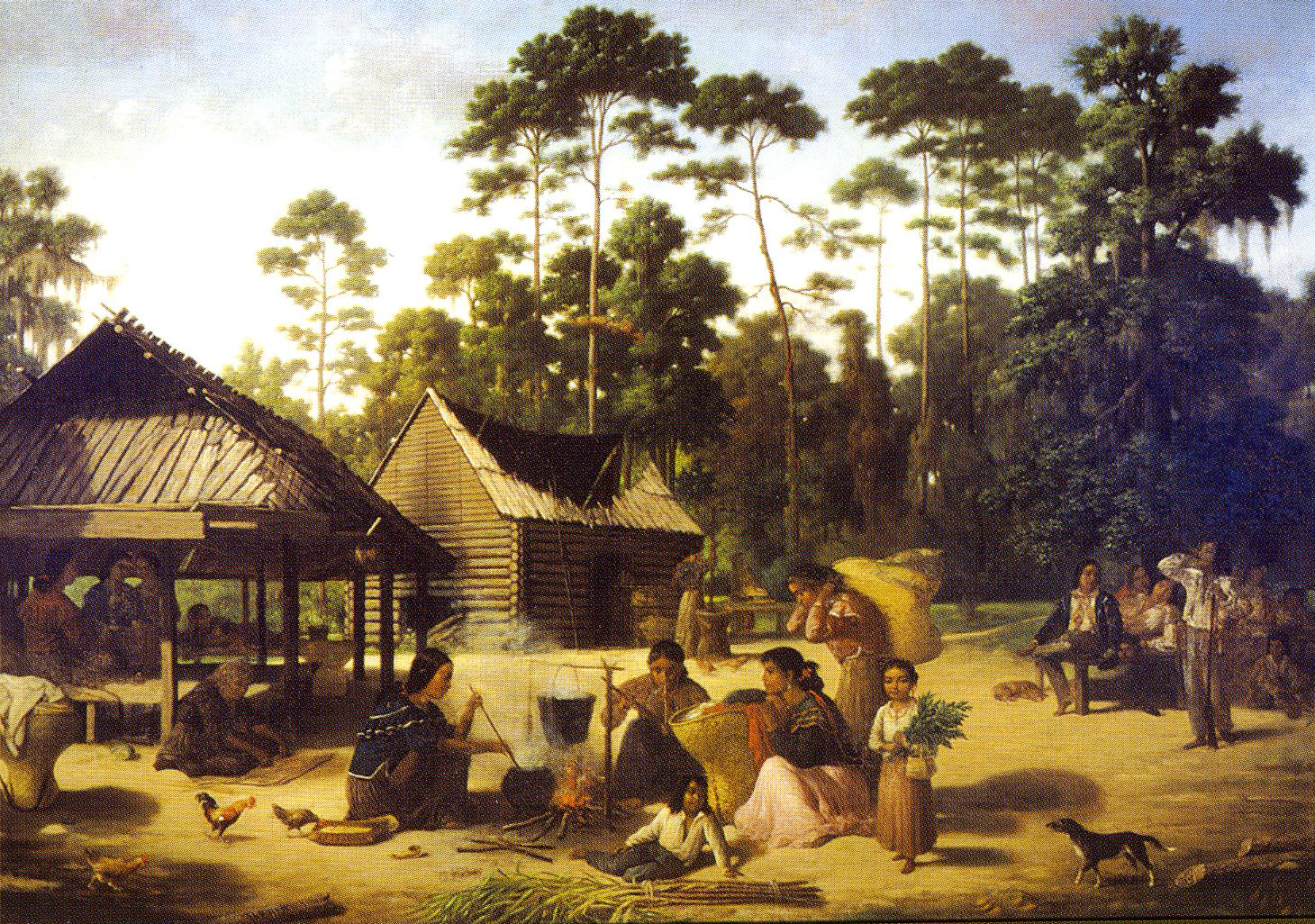
Choctaw village, 1869. The women are making baskets. Honobia's Choctaw settlement would have appeared similarly.

The community is named for O-no-bi-a, Choctaw Indian land allottee. The name of the community is pronounced locally “Hoe-nubby.”

Following the Choctaw Indians' relocation to the area over the Trail of Tears, and the establishment of the Choctaw Nation there, Honobia became home to a Choctaw settlement. Until statehood the area was part of Wade County in the Apukshunnubbee District of the Choctaw Nation. Although the national capital and its stately Choctaw Capitol Building were located only 32 miles away, at Tuskahoma, Honobia was (and remains) isolated.

== Geography ==
Honobia is located on Little River, near its confluences with Honobia Creek and Rock Creek. The community is located in a particularly picturesque part of the Little River valley. The river at this point is a fast-flowing mountain stream, and its narrow valley is framed by steep mountains on both north and south whose summits reach between 1,600 and 1,800 feet in elevation. The mountains are part of the Kiamichi Mountains.

Oklahoma State Highway 144 connects Honobia with the rural communities of Fewell, Nolia, and Nashoba on the west—and with U.S. Highway 271 at Nashoba—and with the even more sparsely populated Octavia on the east, then with U.S. Highway 259.

During recent years, the Choctaw Nation has improved transportation in the Honobia area significantly by constructing a paved, all-weather road over the mountains from U.S. Highway 271 near Albion south over the steep mountain range to Honobia. Locals refer to this as the "Indian Highway." To accomplish its route the Indian Highway travels in a series of switchbacks up the northern side of the mountains and down again on the southern side, allowing for scenic views and vistas.

== Economy ==
Most of the areas to the North and South of Honobia are vast tree plantations owned by timber companies. As such these areas remain wildernesses covering many square miles. Logging provides an important source of jobs for residents. Additionally, locals promote an annual Bigfoot Festival and Conference dedicated to the cryptid, as popularized locally by an alleged 2000 sighting known as "The Siege of Honobia." This is one of the only mainstay boosts to the Honobia area economy.

More information on Honobia and the Little River valley may be found in the Pushmataha County Historical Society.
