= Corinne, Oklahoma =

Unincorporated community in Oklahoma, US

Coordinates: 34°11′09″N 95°17′29″W

Corinne is an unincorporated community in southern Pushmataha County, Oklahoma, United States, located 19 miles east of Antlers. Using the Public Land Survey System commonly in use in Oklahoma, the community is located in T22-4S-R19E.

A United States Post Office opened in Corinne, Indian Territory on August 24, 1904, and operated until September 30, 1958. It was named for Corinne Estill Lesueur, a local resident. Corinne, the daughter of Captain Alexander A. Lesueur—early promoter of Antlers—later moved to Antlers and served as an officer of its Citizens National Bank. The bank later became First National Bank, and, decades later, FirstBank. It continues to operate in the building in which Corinne Lesueur worked.

Captain Lesueur, Corinne's father, was a noted military officer during the Civil War, serving in the Confederate Army from Missouri. During post-war years he served as secretary of state of Missouri, later moving to Antlers.

Corinne, founded during the latter days of the Indian Territory, was located in Cedar County, a part of the Apukshunnubbee District of the Choctaw Nation. Its county seat, Sulphur Springs, Choctaw Nation, was near the present-day community of Rattan.

After Oklahoma's statehood and Pushmataha County's establishment on November 16, 1907, Corinne was site of the new county's first murder. Alfred Holman was killed after a relative argued with brothers Solomon Nihka and Bob Nihka, both Choctaw Indians who were also Snake Indians. Snake Indians were opposed, sometimes violently, to statehood. The Nihka brothers, as was Choctaw custom, turned themselves in to law authorities after being charged.
