= Stanley, Oklahoma =

Unincorporated community in Oklahoma, US

Coordinates: 34°32′24″N 95°28′11″W

Stanley is an unincorporated community in northern Pushmataha County, Oklahoma, United States. The community is on Oklahoma State Highway 2 seven miles southwest of Clayton. The Kiamichi River flows past the southeast side of the site.

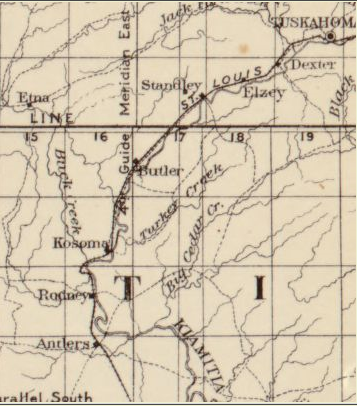
Map showing location of Stanley, Indian Territory, circa 1898

== History ==
A United States Post Office was established at Stanley, Indian Territory on August 20, 1906, and was named for William Eugene Stanley (1844–1910), Governor of Kansas, 1899–1903, and member of the Dawes Commission to the Five Civilized Tribes, 1903–1904. He is buried in Highland Cemetery in Wichita, Kansas. The Dawes Commission was appointed by the U.S. Government to prepare the Choctaw Nation and its sister Five Civilized Tribes for statehood.

During the 1880s the St. Louis-San Francisco Railway, more popularly known as the “Frisco”, built a line from north to south through the Choctaw Nation, connecting Fort Smith, Arkansas with Paris, Texas. The railroad paralleled the Kiamichi River throughout much of its route in present-day Pushmataha County, Oklahoma. Train stations were established every few miles to aid in opening up the land and, more particularly, to serve as the locations of section houses. Supervisors for their respective miles of track lived in the section houses to administer the track and its right-of-way. These stations also served as points at which the trains could draw water.

The site of Stanley was selected because of its proximity to the Kiamichi River, with its abundant water supply. Adjacent station stops were established to the north and south.

The sparsely populated area, at that time known as Jack’s Fork County, a part of the Pushmataha District of the Choctaw Nation, in the Indian Territory, was home to Choctaw Indians who farmed or subsisted on the land.

Few roads or trails existed. Transportation was provided by the Frisco Railroad, which offered six trains per day—three in each direction—until it closed to passenger traffic during the late 1950s. It continued freight operations until 1981, when it closed altogether and its rails were removed. The loss of passenger rail coincided with the construction of Oklahoma State Highway 2.

Stanley is located in one of the most scenic places in Oklahoma. It is surrounded by the Kiamichi Mountains to its east and west, with summits to Stanley’s immediate west reaching 1,600 feet in elevation. The summits to Stanley’s east are lower. The relatively flat valley floor stretches to Stanley’s northeast and southwest.
