= Oklahoma State Highway 144 =

State highway in Oklahoma, United States

State Highway 144

Route information
- Maintained by ODOT
- Length: 36.97 mi (59.50 km)

Major junctions
- West end: US 271 southeast of Clayton
- East end: US 259 east of Octavia

Location
- Country: United States
- State: Oklahoma

Highway system
- Oklahoma State Highway System; Interstate; US; State; Turnpikes
← SH-142	→ SH-145

State Highway 144 (abbreviated SH-144) is a state highway in the Little Dixie region of Oklahoma, United States. It runs 36.97 miles (59.50 km) in Pushmataha and Le Flore Counties. It does not have any lettered spur routes.

== Route description ==
SH-144 begins at US-271, nine miles (14 km) southeast of Clayton. From there it runs to the east through the community of Nashoba, and into the Kiamichi Mountains. Highway 144 parallels the Little River most of the way through the mountains, passing through Fewell, and just south of Honobia.

Highway 144 ends at US-259 in the Kiamichi Mountains, just east of Octavia.

== Junction list ==
County	Location	mi	km	Destinations	Notes
Pushmataha		0.00	0.00	US 271	Western terminus
Le Flore		36.97	59.50	US 259	Eastern terminus
1.000 mi = 1.609 km; 1.000 km = 0.621 mi
