= Zoraya, Oklahoma =

Ghost town in Oklahoma, United States

Zoraya, pronounced "Zoray", is a ghost town in western Pushmataha County, Oklahoma, United States, west of Miller.

A United States Post Office opened at Zoraya, Indian Territory on April 22, 1905, and closed on October 31, 1919. The post office was established by J.A. Kirksey, a white school teacher. He was succeeded as postmaster by only two others: Culberson J. Hudson, a Choctaw Indian minister, and rancher, Benjamin W. Shearon, who managed Warren’s Store, the general store at Miller serving the Impson Valley, as the area was then known.

Originally a Choctaw Indian settlement, Zoraya was host to Pleasant Cove Cumberland Presbyterian Church, which had a Choctaw congregation. At Zoraya’s height, approximately 19 families lived there, and their members are buried in the former church yard. The families lived along a lane, with houses lining either side. By the late 1930s, the church was inactive but the settlement was still inhabited. By the 1950s the settlement was mostly empty. At the time of this writing Zoraya is no longer a settlement, and no remains of its former habitations exist.

Zoraya, at the foot of Long Mountain, was considered a good place to live because of the excellent hunting nearby, in addition to its proximity to three well-watered local streams which offered excellent fishing: Little Davenport, Pine and Ten Mile Creeks. Blue Hole, a deep and never-dry pool of water on Little Davenport Creek, is located nearby and furnished an excellent source of water. It is 100 feet (30 m) long by 20 feet (6.1 m) wide and its water is a deep blue, giving the pool its name.

During the days of the Indian Territory, the United States government set aside 1-acre (4,000 m^{2}) of land for use by the church and a community school, which taught both white and Choctaw students. Accounts also suggest the Government recruited and furnished the teachers and their salaries.

Circa 1900, Pleasant Cove merged with another Cumberland Presbyterian Church congregation approximately eight miles (13 km) away, at Yellow Spring, or “Kulli Lakna” in the Choctaw language. The new congregation was based at Pleasant Cove, and reenergized and enlarged the church.

According to historical accounts Pleasant Cove, or Zoraya, was an important regional political center in the Choctaw Nation. Political party conventions were held here, as were political campaigns. It also served as an Impson Valley polling station for the Choctaw Nation beginning with the Choctaw national election of August 1896. During territorial days Zoraya was located in Jack’s Fork County of the Choctaw Nation.

More information on Zoraya may be found in the Pushmataha County Historical Society.

The only remnant of Zoraya extant is the Zoraya Cemetery, located at 34°19′52″N 95°46′15″W.

== See also ==
- List of ghost towns in Oklahoma
