= Nolia, Oklahoma =

Ghost Town in Oklahoma, United States

Nolia is a former community in eastern Pushmataha County, Oklahoma, United States. It is five miles east of Nashoba. Nolia is located at 34°28′35″N 95°09′06″W at an elevation of 722 feet.

A United States Post Office operated here from October 26, 1912, to December 15, 1920. It was named for Nolia Johnson, wife of Ben F. Johnson (1885-1964), its first postmaster.

Nolia was located in the scenic Little River valley, and was adjacent to Little River. Oklahoma State Highway 144 passes near the site of the community. Musket Mountain (1,200 ft.) lies to the south, and unnamed elevations of the Kiamichi Mountains lie to its north. The rugged Black Fork Creek valley is also to its north.

Much of the land surrounding Nolia, particularly to its north and south, are part of the massive land holdings of a timber company. Some of the most notable roadways in the region are trails, sometimes known as “highways” known only by alphanumeric numbers, snaking atop mountain ridges. The Pickens Creek Trail, Cloudy-Nashoba Trail, Black Fork Trail and Cripple Mountain Trail are among the nearby major roads.

== See also ==
- List of ghost towns in Oklahoma
