= Cloudy, Oklahoma =

Unincorporated community in Oklahoma, US

Cloudy is an unincorporated community located in Pushmataha County, Oklahoma, United States. It is 12 miles northeast of Rattan. Cloudy is located at 34°18′07″N 95°16′52″W.

Using the Public Land Survey System in use in Oklahoma the community is located at T16-3S-R19E.

A post office called Cloudy was established in 1911, and remained in operation until 1983. The community was named after Cloudy Creek.

The earliest marked grave in the Cloudy Cemetery is dated 1898—a time when the area was a part of Cedar County, a part of the Apukshunnubbee District of the Choctaw Nation.

During the waning days of the Indian Territory, the mountains in the area were known as the Seven Devils, and hunting parties from elsewhere in the country used to take the St. Louis-San Francisco Railway to Antlers and travel to the area by horse-drawn wagon. Cloudy and its environs continue to be popular hunting and fishing areas.
