= Kiamichi =

Kiamichi may refer to:

- Kiamichi (horse)
- Kiamichi, Oklahoma

== Other ==
- Kiamichi Mountains
- Kiamichi River
- Kiamichi Railroad
- Kiamichi Shale
- Kiamichi shiner
