= Sardis, Oklahoma =

Ghost Town in Oklahoma, United States

Coordinates: 34°39′57″N 95°24′35″W

Sardis was a community in northern Pushmataha County, Oklahoma. United States. The location is six miles northwest of Clayton.

A United States Post Office was established at Sardis, Indian Territory on February 20, 1905. It took its name from the nearby Sardis Indian Mission Church, which appears to have named itself after the Biblical city of Sardis.

At the time of its founding, Sardis was located in Jack's Fork County, a part of the Pushmataha District of the Choctaw Nation.

During the early 1980s, Jack’s Fork Creek was impounded by the U.S. Army Corps of Engineers, who built Sardis Lake. The lake, a flood control project, also held tourism potential and Oklahoma State Highway 43 was straightened and paved with blacktop from the interchange at Daisy on the Indian Nation Turnpike to the lake, where it crosses the dam and connects to Oklahoma State Highway 2. This allowed for easier road connections to other parts of the state highway network. At this writing, tourism has not been promoted heavily or its economic benefits realized at the lake.

In order to make way for the lake, the community of Sardis was emptied. Its cemetery, now located on an island in the lake connected to the shore by a short causeway, is at the approximate location as it was originally, but the tombstones now sit on landfill and are many feet higher than originally. The graves they denote are below the bottom of the lake. The earliest gravestones are dated 1875, a testament to the community’s early establishment.

Sardis was located in the picturesque Jack’s Fork Creek valley, just above its junction with the Kiamichi River valley, framed by the slopes of Flagpole Mountain (1,562 ft.) on the south and the Potato Hills—a geographic curiosity due to their highly irregular shapes—on the north.

== See also ==
- List of ghost towns in Oklahoma
