= Ringold, Oklahoma =

Unincorporated community in Oklahoma, US

Coordinates: 34°12′54″N 95°07′31″W

Location of Ringold within the state of Oklahoma

Ringold is an unincorporated community in western McCurtain County, Oklahoma, United States, 12 miles northwest of Wright City. It was formerly called Burwell.

A United States Post Office opened at Burwell, Indian Territory on October 31, 1906. It was named for William P. Burwell, its first postmaster. Its name was changed to Ringold on May 10, 1911, after Oklahoma was admitted as a state. The community was named after Ringold, Texas, from which a number of its early European-American settlers migrated.

Until the advent of Oklahoma's statehood, Burwell was located in Cedar County, Choctaw Nation, Indian Territory. In contrast to Burwell/Ringold, some other communities in the area, such as Rattan, are now included in Pushmataha County.
