= Eubanks, Oklahoma =

Ghost Town in Oklahoma, United States

Coordinates: 34°25′19″N 95°35′06″W

Eubanks is a former community in Pushmataha County, Oklahoma, United States. It is 13 miles north of Antlers.

A United States Post Office was established for Eubanks, Indian Territory on February 26, 1907, and operated until April 30, 1934. It was named for William Eubanks, local lumberman.

During the 1880s the St. Louis-San Francisco Railway, more popularly known as the “Frisco”, built a line from north to south through the Choctaw Nation, connecting Fort Smith, Arkansas, with Paris, Texas. The railroad paralleled the Kiamichi River throughout much of its route in present-day Pushmataha County. Train stations were established every few miles to aid in opening up the land and, more particularly, to serve as the locations of section houses. Supervisors for their respective miles of track lived in the section houses to administer the track and its right-of-way. These stations also served as points at which the trains could draw water.

The site of Eubanks was selected because of its proximity to the Kiamichi River, with its abundant water supply. Adjacent station stops were established to the north and south.

The sparsely populated area, at that time known as Jack’s Fork County of the Choctaw Nation, in the Indian Territory, was home to Choctaw Indians who farmed or subsisted on the land.

Few roads or trails existed. Transportation was provided by the Frisco Railroad, which offered six trains per day—three in each direction—until it closed to passenger traffic during the late 1950s. It continued freight operations until 1981, when it closed altogether and its rails were removed. The loss of passenger rail coincided with the construction of Oklahoma State Highway 2.

== See also ==
- List of ghost towns in Oklahoma
