= Cohn, Oklahoma =

Coordinates: 34.6310272°N 95.0420767°W

Cohn is a former railroad switch and loading point on the St. Louis and San Francisco Railway in Pushmataha County, Oklahoma, United States, nine miles south of Talihina. It was named for William Cohn, gravel quarry operator. Cohn appears to have had a fairly short existence and never developed as a commercial or population center.

Prior to Oklahoma's statehood, the Cohn area was located in Wade County, a part of the Moshulatubbee District of the Choctaw Nation.

More information on Cohn may be found in the Pushmataha County Historical Society.
