= Dela, Oklahoma =

Dela
- Unincorporated
- Interactive map of Dela
- Coordinates: 34°12′01″N 95°31′20″W
- Country: United States
- State: Oklahoma
- County: Pushmataha
- Named after: Dela M. Whitaker
- GNIS feature ID: 1100348

Dela is an unincorporated community in Pushmataha County, Oklahoma, United States, located six miles southeast of Antlers. It is within the jurisdiction of the Choctaw Nation of Oklahoma.

A United States Post Office operated here from May 12, 1920, to October 31, 1954. The post office and community were named for Dela M. Whitaker, local schoolteacher.

Dela was originally known as White Church, or Itissa Busha in the Choctaw language, after a Methodist church built by a white settler for use by Choctaw Indians. The date of its construction is unknown, but antedated the settlement in 1886 of nearby Antlers; the earliest grave in its cemetery is dated 1883. When built it was located in what was then Cedar County, a part of the Apukshunnubbee District of the Choctaw Nation.

In the early 1870s, Colonel Victor M. Locke established a prosperous store, grist mill and cotton gin at White Church on White Creek. The Choctaw National Council named the settlement “Lockestown,” at least for use in identifying it as an official Choctaw electoral precinct. Locke moved from White Church to Beaver, as Antlers was then known, in 1875.

The logs for the Methodist church were hauled from Fort Towson for construction. They were whitewashed with lime, leading to the name of Itissa Busha, of White Church, by the Choctaw. By the late 1930s, historical accounts say the Choctaw who formerly lived nearby and worshiped here were deceased and the church was defunct. The church property was purchased by a white farmer, who razed the structure. Its cemetery survives as Dela Cemetery.
