= Darwin, Oklahoma =

Coordinates: 34°14′52″N 95°46′46″W

Darwin
- Unincorporated community
- Interactive map of Darwin
- Country: United States
- State: Oklahoma
- County: Pushmataha
- GNIS feature ID: 1100343

Darwin is an unincorporated community in western Pushmataha County, Oklahoma, United States, nine miles west of Antlers. It is approximately one-half mile east of the Atoka County border.

A United States Post Office opened at Darwin, Indian Territory on July 31, 1905 and operated until March 14, 1955.

Founded during the waning days of the Indian Territory, Darwin was located in Jack’s Fork County, a part of the Pushmataha District of the Choctaw Nation. After Oklahoma’s statehood in 1907, the area became an agricultural and farming center. After the decline of farming, ranching became the economic mainstay and remains the predominant activity.

Currently Darwin does not have a defined center but consists of a larger area. A well-maintained cemetery marks the location of the former community, located just off Oklahoma State Highway 3.
