= Sardis Lake =

Sardis Lake may refer to:

- Sardis Lake (Mississippi), USA
- Sardis Lake (Oklahoma), USA
