= Albion, Oklahoma =

- Town
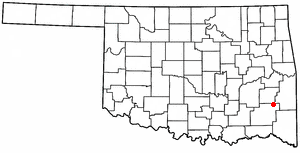
- Location of Albion, Oklahoma
- Coordinates: 34°39′44″N 95°05′58″W
- Country: United States
- State: Oklahoma
- County: Pushmataha

Area
  - Total: 0.24 sq mi (0.62 km^{2})
  - Land: 0.24 sq mi (0.61 km^{2})
  - Water: 0 sq mi (0.00 km^{2})
- Elevation: 663 ft (202 m)

Population (2020)
  - Total: 58
  - Density: 245.9/sq mi (94.96/km^{2})
- Time zone: UTC-6 (Central (CST))
  - Summer (DST): UTC-5 (CDT)
- ZIP code: 74521
- Area codes: 539/918
- FIPS code: 40-01050
- GNIS feature ID: 2412344

Albion is a town in northeast Pushmataha County, Oklahoma, United States, approximately 2 miles (3.2 km) south of the Pushmataha-Latimer county line. The population was 58 as of the 2020 Census. When Albion was established, before Oklahoma became a state, the community was located in Wade County, Choctaw Nation, in what was then known as Indian Territory.

== History ==
A United States Post Office opened at this location on December 6, 1887. Charles F. Igo was the first postmaster.

In its early days, Albion (Note: named by John T. Bailey, an Englishman, using the ancient Greek name for England.)was a sawmill town in the Indian Territory. Later, it became a trading center in an agricultural region in which cotton and other crops were grown.

During 1885–6, the St. Louis-San Francisco Railway, more popularly known as the "Frisco", built a line from north to south through the Choctaw Nation, connecting Fort Smith, Arkansas, with Paris, Texas. The site of Albion was selected because of its proximity to the Kiamichi River, with its abundant water supply. Adjacent station stops were established at Talihina to the north and Kiamichi to the south.

The railroad paralleled the Kiamichi River throughout much of its route in present-day Pushmataha County. Train stations were established every few miles to aid in opening up the land and, more particularly, to serve as the locations of section houses. Supervisors for their respective miles of track lived in the section houses to administer the track and its right-of-way. These stations also served as points at which the trains could draw water.

Few roads or trails existed. Transportation was provided by the Frisco Railroad, which offered six trains per day — three in each direction — until it closed to passenger traffic during the late 1950s. The railroad continued freight operations until 1981, when it closed altogether and its rails were removed. The loss of passenger rail fortunately coincided with the construction of U.S. Highway 271.

At the time of its founding, Albion was located in Wade County, Choctaw Nation.

Albion has more in common economically with Talihina, the town to its north. Planners of the proposed State of Sequoyah, who in 1905 proposed a state to be formed from the Indian Territory, realized this, and called for Albion to be the southernmost town in a county, Wade County, which was also to include Talihina and towns to its north, and stretch far to the north and west. Instead, Sequoyah was not admitted to the Union by Congress, and in the state of Oklahoma which followed it, Albion became the northeasternmost town of a county whose geographic and population centers are far to Albion's southwest.

Albion prospered during its first few decades. Most business was centered on a town square, with residential neighborhoods ringing the square. During recent decades, however, it has diminished greatly. United States Census returns show it dropping from a high of 300 residents in 1920 to just 88 in 1990. More information on Albion may be found in the Pushmataha County Historical Society.

Albion became home to an internationally known poet and author when Mato Kosyk, or Kossick, moved to the town in 1912. Locating there because its climate was considered healthy and its views of the Kiamichi Mountains were scenic, Kosyk lived for the next 28 years there, until his death in 1940. Kosyk, a Lutheran minister, migrated to the United States from Werben, Lower Lusatia, Germany in 1883. He is considered one of the most significant writers in Sorbian, a Slavic language, and his 150th birthday was celebrated by his followers in Europe in 2003. Kosyk may not have fared well during his years in Albion; according to accounts he was swindled and defrauded by unscrupulous residents.

In 1979, the Mato Kosyk House in Albion was entered into the NRHP. It is considered significant as the only surviving structure associated with the famous poet.

The post office in Albion was scheduled for possible closure by the US Postal Service in 2012.

== Geography ==
Using the statewide grid commonly in use in Oklahoma, Albion's coordinates are T2-2N-R21E. According to the United States Census Bureau, the town has a total area of 0.2 square miles (0.52 km^{2}), all land.

== Demographics ==
Historical population
Census	Pop.	Note	%±
1920	301		—
1930	256		−15.0%
1940	240		−6.2%
1950	178		−25.8%
1960	161		−9.6%
1970	186		15.5%
1980	165		−11.3%
1990	88		−46.7%
2000	143		62.5%
2010	106		−25.9%
2020	58		−45.3%
U.S. Decennial Census

=== 2020 census ===
As of the 2020 census, Albion had a population of 58. The median age was 47.5 years. 12.1% of residents were under the age of 18 and 25.9% of residents were 65 years of age or older. For every 100 females there were 141.7 males, and for every 100 females age 18 and over there were 131.8 males age 18 and over.

0.0% of residents lived in urban areas, while 100.0% lived in rural areas.

There were 35 households in Albion, of which 48.6% had children under the age of 18 living in them. Of all households, 40.0% were married-couple households, 28.6% were households with a male householder and no spouse or partner present, and 20.0% were households with a female householder and no spouse or partner present. About 14.3% of all households were made up of individuals and 5.7% had someone living alone who was 65 years of age or older.

There were 36 housing units, of which 2.8% were vacant. The homeowner vacancy rate was 0.0% and the rental vacancy rate was 7.7%.

Racial composition as of the 2020 census
Race	Number	Percent
White	29	50.0%
Black or African American	1	1.7%
American Indian and Alaska Native	24	41.4%
Asian	0	0.0%
Native Hawaiian and Other Pacific Islander	0	0.0%
Some other race	3	5.2%
Two or more races	1	1.7%
Hispanic or Latino (of any race)	6	10.3%

=== 2010 census ===
At the 2010 census, there were 106 people living in the town. The population density was 530 inhabitants per square mile (200/km^{2}). There were 62 housing units at an average density of 261 per square mile (101/km^{2}).

=== 2000 census ===
At the time of the 2000 census, the racial makeup of the town was 83.92% White, 12.59% Native American and 3.50% from two or more races.

There were 53 households, of which 32.1% had children under the age of 18 living with them, 50.9% were married couples living together, 11.3% had a female householder with no husband present, and 35.8% were non-families. 34.0% of all households were made up of individuals, and 20.8% had someone living alone who was 65 years of age or older. The average household size was 2.70 and the average family size was 3.56.

36.4% of the population were under the age of 18, 4.2% from 18 to 24, 24.5% from 25 to 44, 18.2% from 45 to 64, and 16.8% who were 65 years of age or older. The median age was 34 years. For every 100 females, there were 70.2 males. For every 100 females age 18 and over, there were 102.2 males.

The median household income was $14,464 and the median family income was $17,750. Males had a median income of $33,438 and females $13,125. The per capita income for the town was $6,800. 20.0% of families and 33.6% of the population were living below the poverty line, including 43.2% of under eighteens and 8.7% of those over 64.

== Notable people ==
- Mato Kosyk, Sorbian writer

== See also ==
- List of towns in Oklahoma
