= Nashoba, Oklahoma =

Nashoba
- Unincorporated community and Census designated place
- Location within the state of Oklahoma Nashoba (the United States)
- Coordinates: 34°28′54″N 95°12′52″W
- Country: United States
- State: Oklahoma
- County: Pushmataha

Area
  - Total: 0.50 sq mi (1.29 km^{2})
  - Land: 0.49 sq mi (1.28 km^{2})
  - Water: 0.0039 sq mi (0.01 km^{2})
- Elevation: 692 ft (211 m)

Population (2020)
  - Total: 51
  - Density: 102.9/sq mi (39.74/km^{2})
- Time zone: UTC-6 (Central (CST))
  - Summer (DST): UTC-5 (CDT)
- FIPS code: 40-50350
- GNIS feature ID: 2805344

Nashoba is an unincorporated community in Pushmataha County, Oklahoma, United States, 11 miles southeast of Tuskahoma. As of the 2020 census, Nashoba had a population of 51.

A United States Post Office opened at Nashoba, Indian Territory on September 13, 1886. The community took its name from Nashoba County, Choctaw Nation. The county took its name from nashoba, the word in the Choctaw language for “wolf”, and the county was often referred to as Wolf County.

Portions of the Nashoba area were formerly in Nashoba County, Choctaw Nation. Nashoba County was disestablished upon Oklahoma statehood on November 16, 1907 and incorporated into McCurtain County and Pushmataha County.

Transportation in the Nashoba area was revolutionized during the 1950s with the construction of U.S. Highway 271, an all-weather paved highway connecting it to Clayton on the north and Antlers on the south. Oklahoma State Highway 144 connects Nashoba with Honobia and the mountain communities to its east.

The Fewell School, in the vicinity of Nashoba, is on the National Register of Historic Places listings in Pushmataha County, Oklahoma.

== Demographics ==
Historical population
Census	Pop.	Note	%±
2020	51		—
U.S. Decennial Census

=== 2020 census ===
As of the 2020 census, Nashoba had a population of 51. The median age was 41.6 years. 37.3% of residents were under the age of 18 and 31.4% of residents were 65 years of age or older. For every 100 females there were 96.2 males, and for every 100 females age 18 and over there were 113.3 males age 18 and over.

0.0% of residents lived in urban areas, while 100.0% lived in rural areas.

There were 25 households in Nashoba, of which 48.0% had children under the age of 18 living in them. Of all households, 52.0% were married-couple households, 20.0% were households with a male householder and no spouse or partner present, and 24.0% were households with a female householder and no spouse or partner present. About 24.0% of all households were made up of individuals and 16.0% had someone living alone who was 65 years of age or older.

There were 25 housing units, of which 0.0% were vacant. The homeowner vacancy rate was 0.0% and the rental vacancy rate was 0.0%.

Racial composition as of the 2020 census
Race	Number	Percent
White	46	90.2%
Black or African American	0	0.0%
American Indian and Alaska Native	1	2.0%
Asian	1	2.0%
Native Hawaiian and Other Pacific Islander	0	0.0%
Some other race	1	2.0%
Two or more races	2	3.9%
Hispanic or Latino (of any race)	2	3.9%

== Utilities ==
Telephone and Internet is provided by Hilliary Communications.
