= Kiamichi, Oklahoma =

Ghost Town in Oklahoma, United States

Coordinates: 34°38′07″N 95°10′44″W

Kiamichi is a former community in northern Pushmataha County, Oklahoma, United States. It is six miles east of Tuskahoma.

A United States Post Office was established at Kiamichi, Indian Territory on September 27, 1887, and operated until September 14, 1962. The community and post office took their name from the nearby Kiamichi River.

Prior to Oklahoma's statehood, Kiamichi was located in Wade County, Choctaw Nation.

During the 1880s, the St. Louis-San Francisco Railway, more popularly known as the “Frisco”, built a line from north to south through the Choctaw Nation, connecting Fort Smith, Arkansas with Paris, Texas. The railroad paralleled the Kiamichi River throughout much of its route in present-day Pushmataha County. Train stations were established every few miles to aid in opening up the land and, more particularly, to serve as the locations of section houses. Supervisors for their respective miles of track lived in the section houses to administer the track and its right-of-way. These stations also served as points at which the trains could draw water.

The site of Kiamichi was selected because of its proximity to the Kiamichi River, with its abundant water supply. Adjacent station stops were established to the north and south.

The sparsely populated area, at that time known as Jack’s Fork County of the Choctaw Nation, in the Indian Territory, was home to Choctaw Indians who farmed or subsisted on the land.

Few roads or trails existed. Transportation was provided by the Frisco Railroad, which offered six trains per day—three in each direction—until it closed to passenger traffic during the late 1950s. It continued freight operations until 1981, when it closed altogether and its rails were removed. The loss of passenger rail coincided with the paving of U.S. Highway 271.

Pushmataha County, during its early decades, was home to a prosperous cotton farming industry and other agricultural pursuits. Cotton farming had taken place around Kiamichi since territorial times, and a sizable African-American population came to live there. In later decades, with the eclipse of cotton and other agriculture to cattle ranching, the African-American population departed for elsewhere, generally to the south, in search of greater social and economic opportunities.
