= Miller, Oklahoma =

Unincorporated community in Oklahoma, US

Coordinates: 34°18′59″N 95°44′42″W

Miller is an unincorporated community in southwestern Pushmataha County, Oklahoma, United States. It is 10 miles (16 km) northwest of Antlers and a short distance west of Moyers.

A United States Post Office was established at Miller, Indian Territory, on June 22, 1905, and operated until October 31, 1954. It was named for Dr. J. H. Miller Sr. (1889–1924), Antlers rancher.

Miller is located in southern Impson Valley, and lies at the southern foot of Long Mountain, which is to its west. Ten Mile Creek rises on Long Mountain, and it, along with its tributaries, water the floor of the valley, causing Miller to be excellently suited for cattle operations.

Originally called Warren's Store, the community took its name from its first commercial establishment, a store operated by Major W. J. Warren, a Confederate Army veteran who was a prominent local citizen during the waning days of the Indian Territory. As Dr. Miller's cattle operations came to define the area, its name gradually shifted to what it is known as today.

Prior to Oklahoma statehood, Miller was located in Jack's Fork County of the Choctaw Nation. Its county seat—Many Springs, located at present-day Daisy—was to the north of Miller.

Miller is situated at the intersection of Miller–Jumbo Road, connecting to Jumbo on the north and Oklahoma State Highway 3 on the south, and M&M Road, connecting to Moyers to the east. Local landmarks formerly included the old Campton general store on the northwest corner, since razed, and the old Miller school, which burned and was replaced by the community center, on the southwest corner.
