= Mato Kosyk House =

Historic residence in Oklahoma, US

- Mato Kósyk House
- U.S. National Register of Historic Places
- Location within Oklahoma Location within the United States
- Nearest city: Albion, Oklahoma
- Coordinates: 34°40′33″N 95°7′24″W
- Area: less than one acre
- Built: 1910
- NRHP reference No.: 79002025
- Added to NRHP: December 11, 1979

The Mato Kósyk House was a private residence in Albion, Oklahoma. It was added to the National Register of Historic Places in 1979.

== Mato Kósyk ==
Mato Kósyk (1853–1940) was a well-known poet who is considered one of the chief writers of Sorbian, a Slavic language spoken in the Lusatia region of eastern Germany. Kósyk emigrated from Lusatia to the United States during the 19th century, eventually settling in rural Albion, due to its healthy and scenic location amidst the Kiamichi Mountains. At the time of his death Kósyk's writings were actively suppressed by the Nazi government in Germany, which considered Sorbian nationalism a threat to its regime.

== House ==
Kósyk's home was located approximately one-third mile west of Albion. It was a somewhat unprepossessing home, the chief architectural feature of which was a porch wrapped around two sides. It contained a small kitchen on the southwest corner, a large dining room, living room with fireplace, three bedrooms and--added later when the Whitfields owned the property--a modern bathroom. The home, built in approximately 1910, featured a beautiful view of the Kiamichi Mountains. The home was notable for being the sole surviving structure associated with Kósyk. The house fell into disrepair and sustained additional storm damage around 2019, further compromising the structure. The house is no longer in existence.
