= Sulphur Springs, Indian Territory =

Former Choctaw Indian community

Sulphur Springs was a Choctaw Indian community formerly existing in the Choctaw Nation of Indian Territory. It was located 3/4 mile south-southeast of the highway intersection of OK 3 and OK 93 in present-day Rattan, in Pushmataha County, Oklahoma.

Prior to establishment of a United States Post Office in 1910 with the name “Rattan”, the area was called Sulphur Springs. Sulphur Springs was county seat of Cedar County in the Choctaw Nation. It was established by the Choctaw's Doaksville Constitution of 1860 and, in the manner of most Choctaw county seats, served a part-time role as legal and political center. It was never a sizeable settlement and boasted almost no mercantile or retail stores.

County court met on the first Monday of each month and was called Probate Court, even though it was more similar to modern-day county court proceedings than a modern probate court. The court met in a large log house, constructed of long, straight logs, serving as both an Indian Methodist church and court house.

The Cedar County Court House was torn down by white settlers sometime after the dissolution of the Choctaw Nation as a sovereign entity upon Oklahoma's statehood in 1907. A tree stump said to be preserved from the tree used as a whipping post—the preferred form of punishment doled out by the Choctaw Nation judicial system—is now held by the Pushmataha County Historical Society in Antlers, Oklahoma.

Sulphur Springs took its name from several sulphur springs located in the vicinity. A number of Choctaw families living around the Cedar County Court House used them as well as visitors to county court and meetings of the Methodist congregation.
