= Finley, Oklahoma =

Unincorporated community in Oklahoma, US

Coordinates: 34°19′42″N 95°29′42″W

Finley is an unincorporated community and Census designated place in Pushmataha County, Oklahoma, 10 miles northeast of Antlers. As of the 2020 census, Finley had a population of 38.

A United States Post Office was established at Finley, Indian Territory on April 30, 1903, and was named for Sidney W. Finley (1869–1914), local merchant and first postmaster.

Finley was originally called Cedar Church, then Old Cedar Church, the name of a longstanding Choctaw Indian Methodist congregation established there during Indian Territory days. The congregation took its name from nearby Big Cedar Creek—then known as Cedar Creek. The church appears to have waned during the latter days of the Choctaw Nation, probably giving rise to the opportunity to rename the settlement after its first postmaster.

At the time of its founding, Finley was located in Jack's Fork County, a part of the Pushmataha District of the Choctaw Nation.

Finley successfully retains its status as a cohesive community, long after losing its school. It hosts cemetery clean-up days and community dinners in its community center. It continues to have a post office and store.

== Demographics ==
=== 2020 census ===
As of the 2020 census, Finley had a population of 38. The median age was 49.5 years. 18.4% of residents were under the age of 18 and 10.5% of residents were 65 years of age or older. For every 100 females there were 81.0 males, and for every 100 females age 18 and over there were 72.2 males age 18 and over.

0.0% of residents lived in urban areas, while 100.0% lived in rural areas.

There were 22 households in Finley, of which 22.7% had children under the age of 18 living in them. Of all households, 90.9% were married-couple households, 9.1% were households with a male householder and no spouse or partner present, and 0.0% were households with a female householder and no spouse or partner present. About 9.1% of all households were made up of individuals and 4.5% had someone living alone who was 65 years of age or older.

There were 23 housing units, of which 4.3% were vacant. The homeowner vacancy rate was 0.0% and the rental vacancy rate was 0.0%.

Racial composition as of the 2020 census
Race	Number	Percent
White	29	76.3%
Black or African American	0	0.0%
American Indian and Alaska Native	5	13.2%
Asian	0	0.0%
Native Hawaiian and Other Pacific Islander	0	0.0%
Some other race	0	0.0%
Two or more races	4	10.5%
Hispanic or Latino (of any race)	1	2.6%
