= Ethel, Oklahoma =

Unincorporated community in Pushmataha County, Oklahoma, United States

Ethel
- Unincorporated community
- Interactive map of Ethel
- Coordinates: 34°13′46″N 95°32′39″W
- Country: United States
- State: Oklahoma
- County: Pushmataha County
- Elevation: 591 ft (180 m)
- Time zone: UTC−06:00 (CST)
  - Summer (DST): UTC−05:00 (CDT)

Ethel is an unincorporated community in Pushmataha County, Oklahoma, United States, six miles east of Antlers.

A United States Post Office was established at Ethel, Indian Territory on April 22, 1901, and operated until August 15, 1933. It was named for Ethel Labors, early-day resident.

The loss of Ethel's post office was not a verdict on the community's possible lack of prosperity, but was due to its proximity to Antlers. The community continued to be active long after the loss of the post office, with a school and churches. Its school has since closed, but other aspects of organized community life have remained.

Today Ethel's sole landmark is Ethel Baptist Church, although it continues to be a population center and numerous residences are located just off Ethel Road. More information on Ethel may be found in the Pushmataha County Historical Society.
