= Fewell, Oklahoma =

Community in Pushmataha County, Oklahoma, USA

Fewell is a community in eastern Pushmataha County, Oklahoma, United States. Fewell is located at 34°31′05″N 95°03′14″W.

A United States Post Office operated here from November 4, 1913, to October 15, 1943. It was named for Benjamin F. Fewell, its first postmaster.

The Fewell family founded the community and the oldest marked grave in its cemetery dated back to 1906 is that of a Fewell. At the time of its settlement, Fewell was located in the Apukshunnubbee District of the Choctaw Nation.

Fewell is situated in the verdant but isolated Little River valley. The Little River flows adjacent to the community, and the community is framed to the north and south by mountains. The mountains rising from the valley floor on both north and south reach approximately 1,200 feet in elevation, with the mountains behind them reaching approximately 1,600 feet.

Major creeks in the immediate vicinity are Wildhorse Creek and Uphill Creek.

Roads are few and far between in that part of the Little River valley. Oklahoma State Highway 144 traverses the valley east to west. Other major area roads are owned by the private timber companies operating in the mountains to the north and south. The most significant of these roads are often referred to as "highways" or "trails". They are dirt or gravel but are regularly maintained by the timber companies. The roads of most importance in the Fewell are Uphill Bowers Trail, Ferguson Trail, Blackfork Lateral Trail, all to the community's north; and the Nolia Trail to its south.

During recent years the old Fewell School, now a private residence, has been recognized as of historical and architectural significance, and is listed on the National Register of Historic Places.
