= Octavia, Oklahoma =

Unincorporated community in Oklahoma, United States

Coordinates: 34°31′36″N 94°42′11″W

Octavia is an unincorporated community on the Choctaw Reservation, in Le Flore County, Oklahoma, United States.

== History ==
A post office was established at Octavia, Indian Territory on October 29, 1898. It closed on September 30, 1953. It took its name from Octavia Lewis, its first postmaster.

At the time of its founding, Octavia was located in Nashoba County, a part of the Apukshunnubbee District of the Choctaw Nation.
