= Sardis Lake (Oklahoma) =

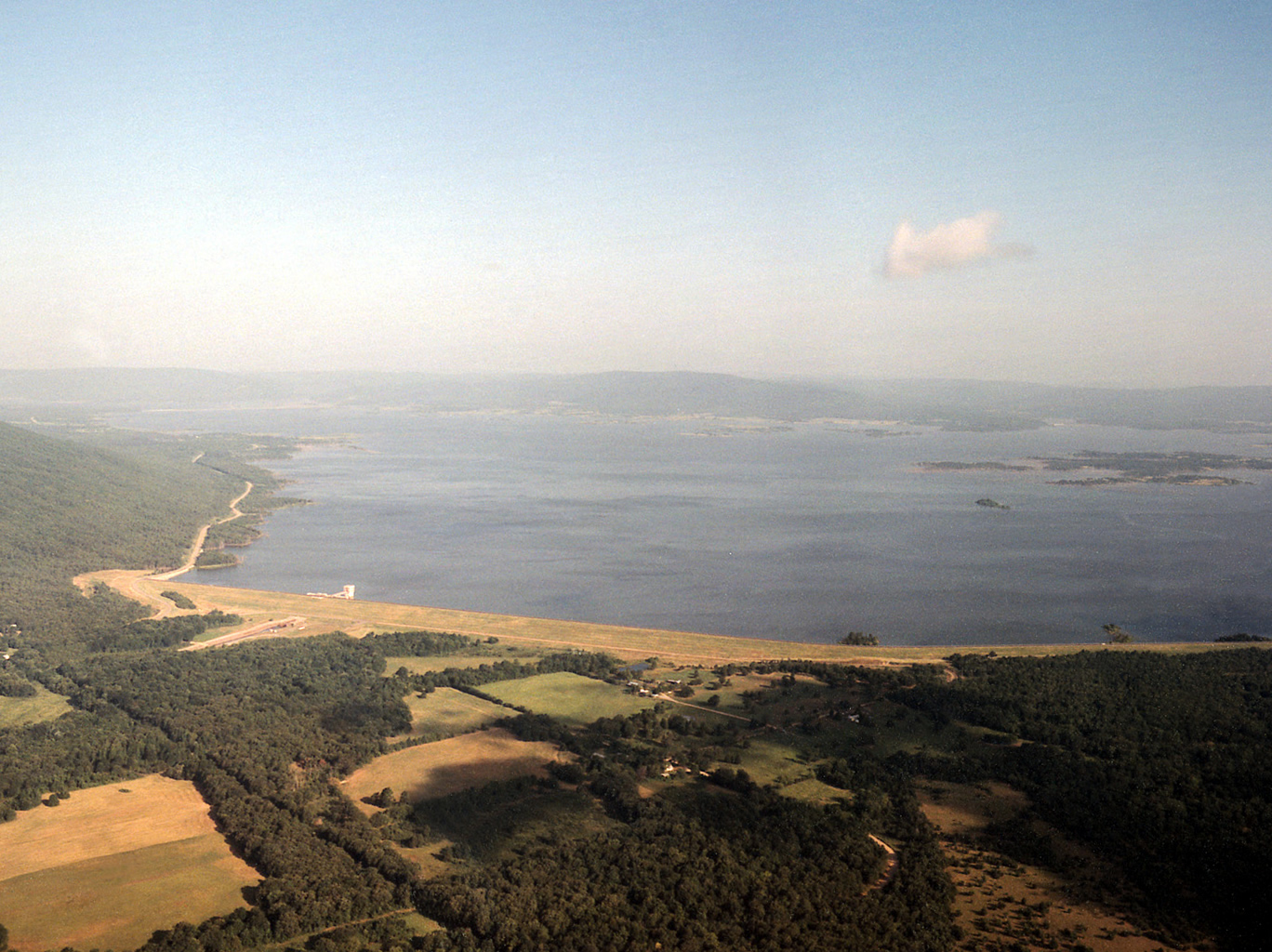
- Aerial view of Sardis Lake

- Location within Oklahoma Location within the United States
- Location: Pushmataha / Latimer counties, Oklahoma, US
- Coordinates: 34°39′30″N 95°22′44″W
- Type: reservoir
- Primary inflows: Jackfork Creek
- Primary outflows: Jackfork Creek
- Basin countries: United States
- Surface area: 14,360 acres (58 km^{2})
- Average depth: 17 ft (5.2 m)
- Water volume: 274,333 acre⋅ft (338.4 hm^{3})
- Shore length^{1}: 117 mi (188 km)
- Surface elevation: 599 ft (183 m)
- Islands: None
- Settlements: Clayton
- ^{1} Shore length is not a well-defined measure.

Sardis Lake is a reservoir in Pushmataha and Latimer counties in Oklahoma, USA. It was created about 1980 as the result of a dam constructed on Jackfork Creek, a tributary of the Kiamichi River, by the United States Corps of Engineers under contract to the state. It is named for the now-defunct town of Sardis, Oklahoma, which had to be abandoned before the area was submerged in the flooding of the lake. (Note: The town was abandoned and submerged when the lake was created about 1980 by the US Army Corps of Engineers.) The lake is located approximately 5 miles (8.0 km) north of Clayton. It is part of the Kiamichi Basin.

A number of issues arose about the state's repayment of debt for the project, the allocation of water from the lake, and proposals by the Oklahoma Water Resources Board to sell lake water outside the state. These issues resulted in a 2011 federal lawsuit by the Chickasaw and Choctaw nations, which had been excluded from negotiations. The state filed a countersuit in 2012, and mediation began that year.

In 2016 an historic water settlement agreement was reached among the State of Oklahoma, Chickasaw Nation and Choctaw Nation, and Oklahoma City, and ratified by these parties and the United States Congress. In brief it provided for the state to have administration and regulatory authority over Sardis Lake, as well as preserving water rights for the Nations in their treaty territories, and allocating a major portion of water from Sardis Lake for the needs of Oklahoma City, dependent on it conducting conservation measures.

== Description ==
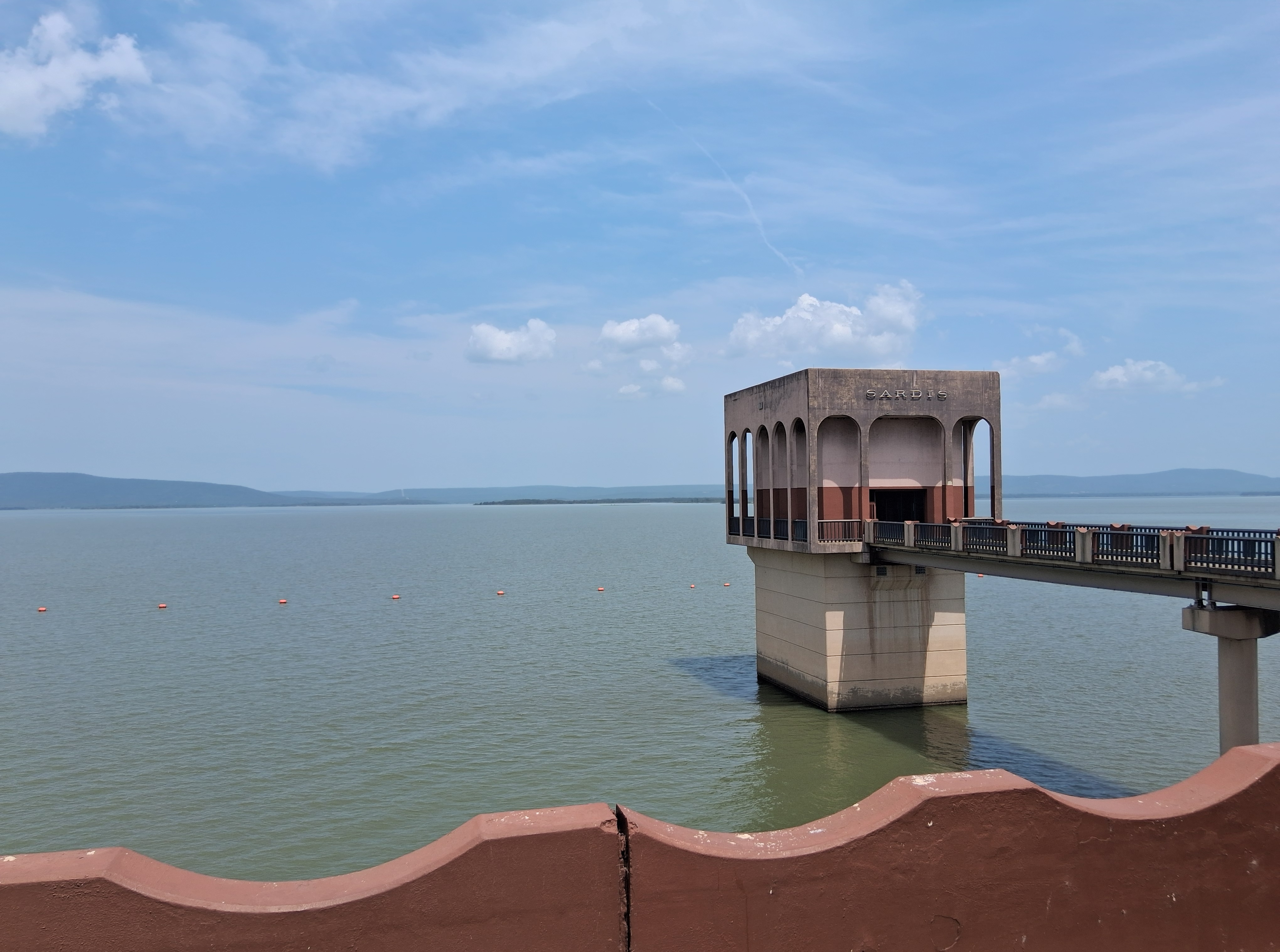
Sardis Pier in 2026

The lake covers 14,360 acres (58 km^{2}) with 117 miles (188 km) of shoreline. The lake is an impoundment of Jackfork Creek, a tributary of the Kiamichi River. Sardis Lake is surrounded by the Winding Stair Mountains on the north and east, the Kiamichi Mountains on the south, and the Jackfork Mountains to the west, all of which are subranges of the Ouachita Mountains. The lake is 45 miles (72 km) east of McAlester, Oklahoma. It drains an area of 275 square miles (710 km^{2}).

The lake's normal pool elevation is 599 feet (183 m) above sea level. Its storage capacity is 274,330 acre-feet (338,380,000 m^{3}). At flood stage its elevation is 607 feet (185 m) above sea level and its capacity rises to 396,900 acre-feet (489,600,000 m^{3}).

== History ==
The U.S. Army Corps of Engineers, led by Donald Mahaffey, constructed the dam and lake between 1977 and 1982 under a contract with the state of Oklahoma. The project was constructed for the purpose of selling water to municipalities and industrial customers in Oklahoma. Oklahoma agreed to make 50 annual payments to the federal government to repay the cost of the construction project, and to pay the costs of operating the dam and lake. However, the state was unable to sell as much water as it needed to recover its costs, so the state discontinued payments to the federal government in 1997.

The federal government sued the state for breach of contract and recovery of funds, in a case known as Oklahoma Water Resources Board v. United States, et al. The case wound its way through the courts. At the appeals level, the appeals court upheld the federal government's suit. Oklahoma lost the case when the Supreme Court declined to hear the case. As a result of the state's failure to pay off its debt, the Corps of Engineers legally owns Sardis Lake.

== Proposed transfer of water ==
Shortly after Sardis Lake was filled, Oklahoma City developed various plans seeking to gain control of much of the water. It presented proposals to the Oklahoma Water Resources Board (OWRB) for moving water from Sardis Lake closer to this major city. One of the first plans, presented by the OWRB in 1992, proposed selling about 93 percent of the water out of state to the North Texas Municipal Water District. Oklahoma City buys water from this district, which serves it across the border. Following heated protests, the state legislature rejected the ORWB plan.

A second attempt to sell the lake's water in Texas (this time to a different water district) occurred in the following year. This proposal would have included having the legislature impose a seven-year moratorium on further out-of-state water sales. This plan also failed to pass in the legislature.

== Litigation ==
=== Debt to Corps of Engineers ===
A news article in June 2010, reported that the State of Oklahoma had paid $27 million to the Corps of Engineers to settle its outstanding debt.

=== Chickasaw Nation and Choctaw Nation, et al. v. Fallin ===
Oklahoma City was seeking to purchase the lion's share of water from Sardis Lake. A state contract executed in 2011, reserved 136,000 acre-feet of water for the Oklahoma City Water Utilities Trust. (OUT) (Note: This amounts to 86.7 percent of the lake's capacity.)

The Chickasaw Nation and Choctaw Nation filed a federal lawsuit in a U.S. District Court in 2011, seeking an injunction that would prevent the state and Oklahoma City from transporting water from Sardis Lake to Oklahoma City. (Note: The case is formally known as Chickasaw Nation vs. Fallin 2011 WL 3629363 (W.D. Okla Aug 18), 2011) (No. CIV-11-927-C). Informally, it has been called Chickasaw v. Fallin and the "Chickasaw Nation complaint." The defendant, Mary Fallin, is the Governor of Oklahoma) They were represented by Michael Burrage (Choctaw) and Bob Rabon as co-lead counsel. Steven H. Greetham, Office of General Counsel of Chickasaw Nation, also served as counsel.

In particular, the tribes said that they had been excluded from negotiations between the OWRB and the OUT, but that they had water rights in their treaty territories. The Choctaw, for example, claimed that their 1830 Treaty of Dancing Rabbit Creek with the United States government gave them authority over water resources in their territory. They were equally concerned about preserving future access to water in their territory.

In 2012 the State filed a counter suit against the United States, in its capacity as trustee for the Chickasaw Nation and Choctaw Nation, entitled OWRB v. United States, et al. CIV 12-275 (W.D. Ok.). The OWRB claimed that treaties signed by the Nations with the United States in the late 19th century, under the Curtis Act and Dawes Act, extinguished tribal land claims and tribal rights, and therefore they could no longer make such claims. The parties entered mediated settlement negotiations. Representatives of the US Department of Justice and Department of Interior entered the negotiations as the cases proceeded.

An article published in the Tulsa Law Review describes the potential legal ramifications for this case:

"If the Chickasaw and Choctaw Nations successfully obtain either full or substantial rights to the waters in Sardis Reservoir, other federally-recognized tribes that have water rights not yet formally recognized may have the footing needed to seek legal protection of those rights. If Oklahoma wins this case... tribal water rights could be severely impaired and the future social and economic wealth of all the tribes in the state could be jeopardized, beginning with the Choctaw and Chickasaw."

== 2016 water settlement agreement ==
In 2016 the parties to this litigation — the state of Oklahoma, Oklahoma City, and the Chickasaw and Choctaw nations — reached an historic settlement agreement on the outstanding issues related to these lawsuits. The settlement was confirmed in federal legislation, "Choctaw Nation of Oklahoma and the Chickasaw Nation Water Settlement, WINN Act, PL 114-322, **; S.612 — 114th Congress (2015-2016)", and legislation passed by the state, the two tribal nations, and the city.
