= Rattan, Oklahoma =

- Town
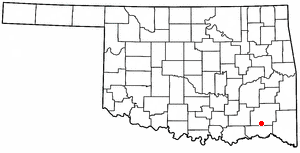
- Location of Rattan, Oklahoma
- Coordinates: 34°12′01″N 95°24′47″W
- Country: United States
- State: Oklahoma
- County: Pushmataha

Area
  - Total: 3.99 sq mi (10.34 km^{2})
  - Land: 3.95 sq mi (10.24 km^{2})
  - Water: 0.039 sq mi (0.10 km^{2})
- Elevation: 459 ft (140 m)

Population (2020)
  - Total: 276
  - Density: 69.8/sq mi (26.95/km^{2})
- Time zone: UTC-6 (Central (CST))
  - Summer (DST): UTC-5 (CDT)
- ZIP code: 74562
- Area code: 580
- FIPS code: 40-61950
- GNIS feature ID: 2412531

Rattan is a town in Pushmataha County, Oklahoma, United States. The population was 276 at the 2020 census.

== Geography ==
Rattan is located in southern Pushmataha County at the intersection of Oklahoma routes 3 and 93. Rock Creek flows past just west of the community center and Hugo Lake lies to the south in adjacent Choctaw County. The southwest end of the Ouachita Mountains lies to the north.

According to the United States Census Bureau, the town has a total area of 4.0 square miles (10 km^{2}), all land.

== History ==
Established in approximately 1910, Rattan was named for Rattan, Texas, from which a number of its early white settlers came.

Rattan, Texas—located in Delta County, twenty-one miles southwest of Paris, Texas—was named for local postal officer Clarence V. Rattan in 1893. Following Oklahoma's statehood in 1907 a number of Delta County families relocated to the new Pushmataha County, among them Akins, Akards, and Helms. The Delta County family (or families) apparently establishing itself in Rattan has not been identified.

Originally overshadowed by the nearby white settlement of Belzoni, Oklahoma, Rattan did not become economically successful enough to merit its own United States Post Office until December 12, 1910, with its first postmaster being Moses A. Fleming. Belzoni’s success as a farming hub sapped Rattan of much of its potential vitality, and it was not until the former's decline that Rattan emerged as the population center of southeastern area of the county.

Prior to establishment of its post office with the name “Rattan”, the area was called Sulphur Springs, Indian Territory. Sulphur Springs, located 3/4 mile south-southeast of the highway intersection of OK 3 and OK 93 in present-day Rattan, was county seat of Cedar County, Choctaw Nation. It was established by the Choctaws’ Doaksville Constitution of 1860 and, in the manner of most Choctaw county seats, served a part-time role as legal and political center. It was never a sizeable permanent settlement and boasted almost no mercantile or retail stores.

County court met on the first Monday of each month and was called Probate Court, even though it was more similar to modern-day county court proceedings than a modern probate court. The court met in a large log house, constructed of long, straight logs, serving as both an Indian Methodist church and court house. The Cedar County Court House was torn down by white settlers sometime after Oklahoma’s statehood in 1907, after which it ceased serving any legal use. The Court House was located about 200 yards north of the Sulphur Springs and 1/4 mile due west of Rattan Cemetery.

Sulphur Springs took its name from several sulphur springs located in the vicinity. A number of Choctaw families living around the Cedar County Court House used them as well as visitors to court.

The improved Ft. Smith to Ft. Towson military road of 1839 passed along the east side of Rattan (at the water tower and Howard's Cafe, 1.02 miles east of the OK 93 junction with OK 3) after crossing the "Seven Devils" on its way southeast to Spencer Academy and Doaksville. This wagon road was heavily used by the U.S. Army from 1839–48, and remained the main road through Cedar County until the Frisco railroad was completed in 1887 from Ft. Smith through Antlers to Paris, Texas. The initial U.S. land survey of the area was conducted in 1896. T4S, R18E shows Rock Creek, the Court House and the military road.

Natural resources were key to Rattan’s early growth. Many of its settlers were farmers. Timber, logged in the Kiamichi Mountains north of the community, also fueled growth. A number of logging trams, or railroad lines, were built into the mountains and large camps of loggers and their dependents lived along the tracks for months on end. These mobile, rolling communities were sizeable enough to feature small schools, physicians offices, and general stores. Most of their residents lived in railroad cars which traveled along with the work crews as they logged deeper into the mountains.

Rattan became the Great Depression-era recipient of a handsome public school built by the Works Progress Administration. Constructed of native stone brought from nearby fields, it continues in use today.

During the 1990s Rattan incorporated as a town, and now offers basic public services.

School students from Rattan made news headlines during 2000 as they initiated a series of events with international repercussions. During World War II the Moyers area was the site of two lethal air crashes. British pilots operating from a Royal Air Force base in Texas crashed into White Rock Mountain and Big Mountain, killing four crew men. Two planes were destroyed. A third plane crash-landed successfully a few miles northwest at Jumbo.

These events had receded from memory and were generally forgotten until a history class in the Rattan Public School began pursuing information about them. Their research led them to commemorate the events. On February 20, 2000, the AT6 Monument was dedicated in the fliers' honor at the crash site on Big Mountain. Over 1,000 people attended the ceremony, and the story of it and Rattan's intrepid young scholars was carried by the British Broadcasting Corporation and many newspapers around the world.

More information on Rattan, Sulphur Springs, the AT6 Monument, and the Kiamichi River valley may be found in the Pushmataha County Historical Society.

== Demographics ==
Historical population
| Census | Pop. | Note | %± |
|---|---|---|---|
| 1980 | 332 | | — |
| 1990 | 257 | | −22.6% |
| 2000 | 241 | | −6.2% |
| 2010 | 310 | | 28.6% |
| 2020 | 276 | | −11.0% |
U.S. Decennial Census

=== 2020 census ===
As of the 2020 census, Rattan had a population of 276. The median age was 39.3 years. 27.9% of residents were under the age of 18 and 19.2% of residents were 65 years of age or older. For every 100 females there were 101.5 males, and for every 100 females age 18 and over there were 93.2 males age 18 and over.

0.0% of residents lived in urban areas, while 100.0% lived in rural areas.

There were 114 households in Rattan, of which 33.3% had children under the age of 18 living in them. Of all households, 42.1% were married-couple households, 23.7% were households with a male householder and no spouse or partner present, and 30.7% were households with a female householder and no spouse or partner present. About 29.9% of all households were made up of individuals and 18.4% had someone living alone who was 65 years of age or older.

There were 138 housing units, of which 17.4% were vacant. The homeowner vacancy rate was 0.0% and the rental vacancy rate was 6.4%.

Racial composition as of the 2020 census
| Race | Number | Percent |
|---|---|---|
| White | 178 | 64.5% |
| Black or African American | 1 | 0.4% |
| American Indian and Alaska Native | 54 | 19.6% |
| Asian | 0 | 0.0% |
| Native Hawaiian and Other Pacific Islander | 0 | 0.0% |
| Some other race | 8 | 2.9% |
| Two or more races | 35 | 12.7% |
| Hispanic or Latino (of any race) | 13 | 4.7% |

=== 2000 census ===
As of the census of 2000, there were 241 people, 111 households, and 65 families residing in the town. The population density was 60.6 inhabitants per square mile (23.4/km^{2}). There were 127 housing units at an average density of 31.9 per square mile (12.3/km^{2}). The racial makeup of the town was 81.74% White, 12.86% Native American, 1.24% Pacific Islander, and 4.15% from two or more races. Hispanic or Latino of any race were 2.49% of the population.

There were 111 households, out of which 27.0% had children under the age of 18 living with them, 49.5% were married couples living together, 8.1% had a female householder with no husband present, and 41.4% were non-families. 37.8% of all households were made up of individuals, and 19.8% had someone living alone who was 65 years of age or older. The average household size was 2.17 and the average family size was 2.91.

In the town, the population was spread out, with 22.0% under the age of 18, 3.3% from 18 to 24, 25.7% from 25 to 44, 24.5% from 45 to 64, and 24.5% who were 65 years of age or older. The median age was 45 years. For every 100 females, there were 82.6 males. For every 100 females age 18 and over, there were 86.1 males.

The median income for a household in the town was $20,357, and the median income for a family was $29,167. Males had a median income of $30,833 versus $24,500 for females. The per capita income for the town was $11,819. About 17.6% of families and 20.3% of the population were below the poverty line, including 25.9% of those under the age of eighteen and 17.8% of those 65 or over.

== Notable person ==
- Tobias W. Frazier, member of the Choctaw code talkers
