= Wade County, Choctaw Nation =

Former political subdivision

Wade County was a political subdivision of the Choctaw Nation of Indian Territory, prior to Oklahoma being admitted as a state. The county formed part of the Nation's Apukshunnubbee District, or First District, one of three administrative super-regions.

The county was named for Alfred Wade, a prominent Choctaw leader and statesman. Following the American Civil War—in which the Choctaw Nation joined the Confederate States of America—Wade was among the national leaders who traveled to Washington to negotiate with the American government to secure peace, achieved at great cost via the Treaty of 1866. Wade lived six miles east of Talihina.

The county seat of Wade County was Lenox, or Tuli Hina in the Choctaw language, five miles east of Whitesboro and 14 miles east of Talihina. Lenox was situated near the Kiamichi River. A United States Post Office operated here from 1896-1913. Lenox served primarily as a court ground, not as a population center.

The Choctaw Nation's capital, Tushka Homma, with its splendid Choctaw Capitol Building, was also located in the county.

Wade County's boundaries were established and designated according to easily recognizable natural landmarks, as were the boundaries of all Choctaw Nation counties. As example, the confluence of Jack's Fork Creek with the Kiamichi River—just outside present-day Clayton, Oklahoma—served as the southwestern corner, with the county's landmass stretching to the east and north. From this corner point the southern border followed the Kiamichi to the south for a distance, and then was defined to the east along the tops of the Kiamichi Mountains framing the south side of the river valley, south of Tuskahoma and Albion. Wade County served as an election district for members of the National Council, and as a unit of local administration. Constitutional officers, all of whom served for two-year terms and were elected by the voters, included the county judge, sheriff, and a ranger. The judge's duties included oversight of overall county administration. The sheriff collected taxes, monitored unlawful intrusion by intruders (usually white Americans from the United States), and conducted the census. The county ranger advertised and sold strayed livestock.

As Oklahoma's statehood approached, its leading citizens, who were gathered for the Oklahoma Constitutional Convention, realized in laying out the future state's counties that, while logically designed, the Choctaw Nation's counties could not exist as economically viable political subdivisions. In most the county seat existed generally for holding county court and not as a population center. This was true of Lenox, too. While Wade County contained more sizeable towns than most, it would have to be dismantled in order to accommodate changes required by the region as a whole.

This conundrum was also recognized by the framers of the proposed State of Sequoyah, who met in 1905 to propose statehood for the Indian Territory. The Sequoyah Constitutional Convention also proposed a county structure that abolished the Choctaw counties. Wade County is divided principally into the proposed Pushmataha and Wade counties. Talihina and Albion would have been Wade County's chief towns.

Much of this proposition was two years later borrowed by Oklahoma's framers, who largely adopted the proposed boundaries or concepts of these counties for the future Le Flore, McCurtain and Pushmataha counties in Oklahoma. Certain shifts were made: the town of Albion was given to the new Pushmataha County, and Wilburton was given to the new Le Flore County instead of Pittsburg County. (The Sequoyah framework had called for Wilburton to be placed in the same county as Hartshorne, and Albion to be grouped together with Talihina in a new Wade County).

The territory formerly comprising Wade County now falls primarily within Le Flore and Pushmataha counties. Wade County ceased to exist upon Oklahoma's statehood on November 16, 1907.
