= Cedar County, Choctaw Nation =

Cedar County was a political subdivision of the Choctaw Nation in the Indian Territory. The county formed part of the nation’s Apukshunnubbee District, or Second District, one of three administrative super-regions.

The word for "Cedar" in the Choctaw language is Chuala. The county was often referred to as Chuala County.

Cedar County was established by the Choctaw Nation’s Doaksville Constitution of 1860. It ceased to exist on November 16, 1907, along with the Choctaw Nation and the Indian Territory, upon the advent of Oklahoma’s statehood. The territory comprising the former county is now included in the Pushmataha County and McCurtain County in Oklahoma.

The county seat of Cedar County was Sulphur Springs, located near present-day Rattan, Oklahoma in Pushmataha County.

Like all Choctaw counties, Cedar County served as an election district for members of the National Council, and as a unit of local administration. Constitutional officers, all of whom served for two-year terms and were elected by the voters, included the county judge, sheriff, and a ranger. The judge’s duties included oversight of overall county administration. The sheriff collected taxes, monitored unlawful intrusion by intruders (usually white Americans from the United States), and conducted the census. The county ranger advertised and sold strayed livestock.

Choctaw political subdivisions were drawn according to easily recognizable or popular natural landmarks, such as mountain ranges, rivers or streams. Cedar County’s boundaries were determined likewise—its western boundary was the Kiamichi River and its eastern boundary was Little River (Red River). Its northern border ran along the top of the Kiamichi Mountains south of Tuskahoma.

The county took its name from Cedar Creek—today known as Big Cedar Creek—which in turn lent its name to Old Cedar Church, a Choctaw Indian Methodist congregation around which the present-day settlement of Finley, Oklahoma was established.

Cedar County was large, scenic and mountainous. Due to the rough terrain imposed by the Kiamichi Mountains the county was not home to any towns, only isolated settlements and encampments. After the Choctaw Nation’s settlement by whites in the 1880s and 1890s the county became known for its hunting and fishing opportunities, and tourists from Paris, Texas and elsewhere took the St. Louis and San Francisco Railway to Antlers, Oklahoma from which they traveled east to Cedar County for hunting and fishing expeditions lasting for several days or more.
