= Clayton, Oklahoma =

- Town
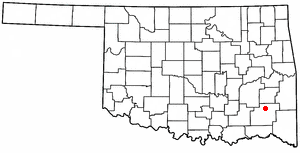
- Location of Clayton, Oklahoma
- Coordinates: 34°35′08″N 95°21′22″W
- Country: United States
- State: Oklahoma
- County: Pushmataha

Area
  - Total: 1.70 sq mi (4.41 km^{2})
  - Land: 1.68 sq mi (4.35 km^{2})
  - Water: 0.023 sq mi (0.06 km^{2})
- Elevation: 607 ft (185 m)

Population (2020)
  - Total: 555
  - Density: 330.3/sq mi (127.54/km^{2})
- Time zone: UTC-6 (Central (CST))
  - Summer (DST): UTC-5 (CDT)
- ZIP code: 74536
- Area codes: 539/918
- FIPS code: 40-14900
- GNIS feature ID: 2413210
- Website: cityofclaytonok.com

Clayton is a town in northern Pushmataha County, Oklahoma, United States. The population was 555 as of the 2020 Census.

== History ==
Clayton was formerly known as Dexter. A United States Post Office was established at Dexter, Indian Territory on March 31, 1894, and was named for Dexter Chapman, early-day resident.

Dexter was located in Wade County, Choctaw Nation.

The official name of the post office name changed to Clayton, Indian Territory on April 5, 1907. Its name is thought to have been derived from Clayton, Missouri. It is also possible the town renamed itself after William H.H. Clayton, judge of the U.S. Court for the Central District of Indian Territory. Judge Clayton was prominent in the role to gain Oklahoma’s statehood.

Clayton is the largest town or community in northern Pushmataha County. It is the region's largest trading center due to its relative distance from the county seat of Antlers—36 miles.

Flagpole Mountain retains a fire tower. Built of metal and several stories tall, it was once part of a network of towers, all staffed, from which a fire watch was maintained. It is the only tower remaining in Pushmataha County, although it is no longer operational. Views from the tower offer a panorama stretching for many miles in any direction.

Clayton, as regional trading center, remains economically healthy, with a locally based economy. It is currently home to a public school, several churches, and numerous businesses and homes.

During recent years the Clayton High School has become recognized as an architecturally and historically significant building, and has been added to the NRHP. The building was found to be a very unusual example of WPA architecture—one of only two known single-use auditoriums constructed by the WPA.

On February 13, 2015, approximately 5% of the town population was arrested in a methamphetamine drug sweep.

More information on the history of Clayton may be found in the Pushmataha County Historical Society.

== Geography ==
According to the United States Census Bureau, the town has a total area of 1.7 square miles (4.4 km^{2}), of which 1.7 square miles (4.4 km^{2}) is land and 0.58% is water.

Clayton, located in the Kiamichi River valley, is framed on its west by Flagpole Mountain (1,562 ft.) and to its east by unnamed mountains topping 1,600 feet in elevation. Within a few miles of Clayton is scenic McKinley Rocks, a collection of massive boulders strewn across a mountain top. South of Clayton is Clayton Lake State Park which is surrounded by a pine tree forest. Northwest of town is Sardis Lake, a U.S. Army Corps of Engineers dam which impounds the water of Jack's Fork Creek. The Pushmataha Wildlife Refuge is also nearby.

== Utilities ==
- Telephone, Internet, and Digital TV Services is provided by Hilliary Communications.

== Demographics ==
Historical population
| Census | Pop. | Note | %± |
|---|---|---|---|
| 1950 | 612 | | — |
| 1960 | 615 | | 0.5% |
| 1970 | 718 | | 16.7% |
| 1980 | 833 | | 16.0% |
| 1990 | 636 | | −23.6% |
| 2000 | 719 | | 13.1% |
| 2010 | 821 | | 14.2% |
| 2020 | 555 | | −32.4% |
U.S. Decennial Census

=== 2020 census ===
As of the 2020 census, Clayton had a population of 555. The median age was 43.8 years. 20.9% of residents were under the age of 18 and 23.4% of residents were 65 years of age or older. For every 100 females there were 88.8 males, and for every 100 females age 18 and over there were 84.5 males age 18 and over.

0.0% of residents lived in urban areas, while 100.0% lived in rural areas.

There were 251 households in Clayton, of which 27.9% had children under the age of 18 living in them. Of all households, 35.5% were married-couple households, 18.7% were households with a male householder and no spouse or partner present, and 41.4% were households with a female householder and no spouse or partner present. About 37.8% of all households were made up of individuals and 22.3% had someone living alone who was 65 years of age or older.

There were 380 housing units, of which 33.9% were vacant. The homeowner vacancy rate was 9.5% and the rental vacancy rate was 25.0%.

Racial composition as of the 2020 census
| Race | Number | Percent |
|---|---|---|
| White | 381 | 68.6% |
| Black or African American | 1 | 0.2% |
| American Indian and Alaska Native | 126 | 22.7% |
| Asian | 4 | 0.7% |
| Native Hawaiian and Other Pacific Islander | 0 | 0.0% |
| Some other race | 7 | 1.3% |
| Two or more races | 36 | 6.5% |
| Hispanic or Latino (of any race) | 10 | 1.8% |

=== 2000 census ===
As of the census of 2000, there were 719 people, 335 households, and 191 families residing in the town. The population density was 424.0 inhabitants per square mile (163.7/km^{2}). There were 404 housing units at an average density of 238.3 per square mile (92.0/km^{2}). The racial makeup of the town was 74.41% White, 19.33% Native American, and 6.26% from two or more races. Hispanic or Latino of any race were 0.70% of the population.

There were 335 households, out of which 28.4% had children under the age of 18 living with them, 41.8% were married couples living together, 12.8% had a female householder with no husband present, and 42.7% were non-families. 40.0% of all households were made up of individuals, and 22.7% had someone living alone who was 65 years of age or older. The average household size was 2.15 and the average family size was 2.88.

In the town, the population was spread out, with 25.3% under the age of 18, 7.9% from 18 to 24, 23.8% from 25 to 44, 22.9% from 45 to 64, and 20.0% who were 65 years of age or older. The median age was 38 years. For every 100 females, there were 83.0 males. For every 100 females age 18 and over, there were 77.8 males.

The median income for a household in the town was $23,516, and the median income for a family was $23,009. Males had a median income of $13,750 versus $17,556 for females. The per capita income for the town was $13,530. Below the poverty line were 8.8% of people, 31.3% of families, 49.4% of those under 18 and 37.0% of those over 64.
