= Jack's Fork County =

Coordinates: 34.5360°N 95.7397°W

Jack's Fork County, also known as Jack Fork County, was a political subdivision of the Choctaw Nation of Indian Territory. The county formed part of the nation's Pushmataha District, or Third District, one of three administrative super-regions.

The county seat of Jack's Fork County was Many Springs, the modern community of Daisy, Oklahoma. The U.S. Government called it Etna, and a post office operated here using that name from 1884-1897.

== History ==
=== Formation and etymology ===
Jack's Fork County was organized by the General Council of the Choctaw Nation in 1850, as one of 19 original counties. It took its name from the stream by the same name, which in turn appears to have taken its name from an early-day settler or explorer, possibly French. The stream bore this name by at least 1819, when it appeared on a map drawn by explorer Thomas Nuttal.

=== Boundaries ===
Jack's Fork County's boundaries were, as were all Choctaw counties, designated according to easily recognizable natural landmarks. Much of its southern boundary, south of Antlers, Oklahoma was formed by Dumpling Creek. Much of its western boundary was Muddy Boggy Creek. Its eastern boundary, in part, was formed by the Kiamichi River and its northern boundary was, in part, Brushy Creek.

=== Statehood for Oklahoma ===
As Oklahoma's statehood approached, its leading citizens, who were gathered for the Oklahoma Constitutional Convention, realized in laying out the future state's counties that Jack's Fork County could not exist as an economically viable political subdivision. Its county seat existed generally for holding county court, and not as a population center. Most of its terrain was mountainous and still untamed; and its only sizeable town, Antlers, geographically isolated in Jack Fork County's extreme southeast corner, would be separated from much of the town's natural economic hinterland, which, at statehood, fell within neighboring Cedar County and Kiamitia County (Kiamichi County) of the Choctaw Nation.

This conundrum was also recognized by the framers of the proposed State of Sequoyah, who met in 1905 to propose statehood for the Indian Territory. The county structure proposed by the Sequoyah Constitutional Convention also abolished the Choctaw counties. Jack's Fork County was divided principally into the proposed Bixby and Pushmataha counties, whose county seats would have been Atoka and Antlers, respectively. Much of this proposition was borrowed by Oklahoma's framers, who largely adopted the proposed boundaries for Bixby County but called it Atoka County, and also borrowed, with few changes, the boundaries of the proposed Pushmataha County, Sequoyah for its Oklahoma equivalent.

=== Administration ===
Like all Choctaw counties, Jack's Fork County served as an election district for members of the National Council, and as a unit of local administration. Constitutional officers, all of whom served for two-year terms and were elected by the voters, included the county judge, sheriff, and a ranger. The judge's duties included oversight of overall county administration. The sheriff collected taxes, monitored unlawful intrusion by intruders (usually white Americans from the United States), and conducted the census. The county ranger advertised and sold strayed livestock.

=== Modern day ===
The territory formerly comprising Jack's Fork County now falls primarily within Atoka County and Pushmataha County, and to a small degree Pittsburg County, in Oklahoma. The county's name, corrupted after statehood to "Jackfork", lives on in the name of Jackfork Creek, a major tributary of the Kiamichi River.
