= Kiamichi Mountains =

Mountain range in Oklahoma, United States

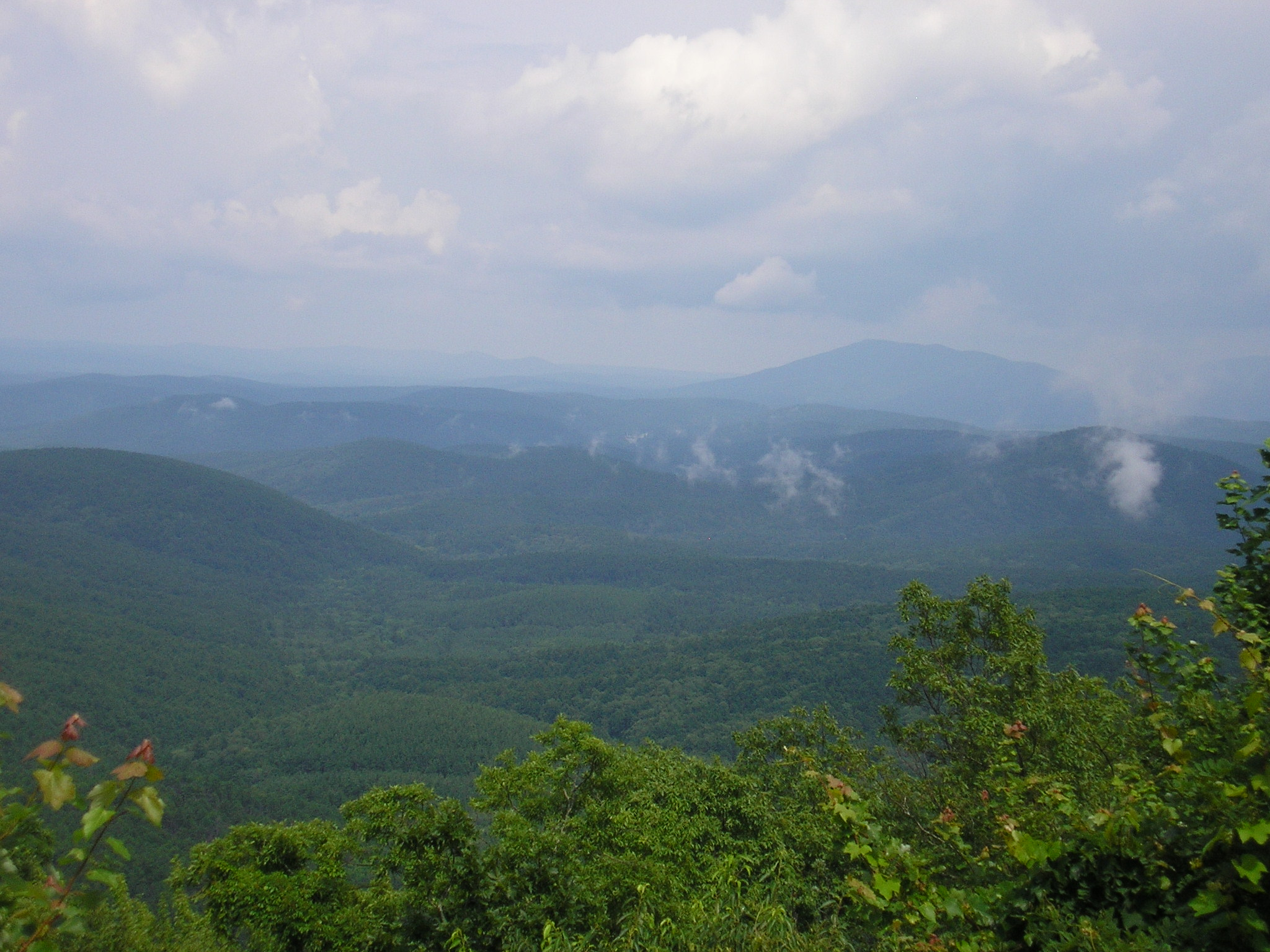
- The mountains seen from the Talimena vista

Highest point
- Peak: Lynn Mountain
- Elevation: 2,500 ft (760 m)
- Coordinates: 34°35′46″N 94°33′35″W

Naming
- Etymology: Choctaw for horned-screamer bird

Geography
- Country: United States
- State: Oklahoma
- Parent range: U.S. Interior Highlands

The Kiamichi Mountains (Choctaw: Nʋnih Chaha Kiamitia) are a mountain range in southeastern Oklahoma. A subrange within the larger Ouachita Mountains that extend from Oklahoma to western Arkansas, the Kiamichi Mountains sit within Le Flore, Pushmataha and McCurtain counties near the towns of Poteau, Albion and Smithville. The foothills of the Kiamichi Mountains sit within Haskell County, Northern Latimer County and Northern Pittsburg County. Its peaks, which line up south of the Kiamichi River, reach 2,500 feet in elevation. The range was the namesake of Kiamichi Country, the official tourism designation for southeastern Oklahoma, until the designation was changed to Choctaw Country.

Black bear, coyote, bobcat, deer, cougar, minks, bats, bald eagles (sacred to the Choctaw), varieties of woodpeckers, doves, owls, road runners and 328 vertebrate species are native to this region.

The Kiamichi Mountains are ancient, and are venerated by the Choctaws. By projecting the existing mountains down to their subsurface roots geologists know that they once stood as tall as the modern-day Rocky Mountains, which are much younger. The highly serrated, jagged appearance of the Rockies and other tall mountain ranges may be attributed to their youth. By contrast the Kiamichi Mountains, which are much older—and now shorter—feature the highly eroded characteristics common among much older mountains.

Geologists generally define a mountain as a natural landform topping at least 1,000 feet in elevation. Numerous of the mountains, particularly those along the Kiamichi River's lower reaches, measure between 700 and 900 feet in elevation. Although called “mountains” they are, more formally, hills.

Precise definitions of the extent and scope of the Kiamichi Mountains have never been formally assigned. They constitute more of a cultural construct than formal geographical designation. Local residents generally identify the mountains as those occurring on either side of the Kiamichi River along the full extent of its course, until it flows into the flat coastal plain of southern Oklahoma.

North of the Kiamichi Mountains are the Winding Stair Mountains, named by early American explorers for their cascading appearance as a series of stairsteps.

East of the Little River are the Bok Tuklo Mountains, which are commonly considered a continuation of the Kiamichi Mountains, although far removed from the namesake river. These mountains take their name from Bok Tuklo County in the old Choctaw Nation. Bok Tuklo, in the Choctaw language, means “two creeks” and refers to Lukfata Creek and Yasho Creek, both in McCurtain County, Oklahoma.

Portions of the mountains are protected by the Upper Kiamichi River Wilderness National Wildlife Refuge and the Ouachita National Forest. The wildlife refuge includes much of the Kiamichi River's upper reaches and headwaters. The National Forest exists as two spurs, or arms, of its larger area in Arkansas, and may be found in Le Flore County and McCurtain County.

Substantial portions of the mountains are owned by timber companies, who operate massive tree plantations consisting of fast-growing pine trees. Logging is the region's chief industry.

Tourism is also important, although it makes a smaller economic impact. The Talimena Scenic Drive, connecting Talihina, Oklahoma with Mena, Arkansas is a tourist destination during autumn. Fishing is common year-round, as is hunting during hunting season.

Several flood control reservoirs built and maintained by the U.S. Army Corps of Engineers or the state, including Broken Bow Lake, Clayton Lake, McGee Creek Lake, Pine Creek Lake, and Sardis Lake, are framed by views of the mountains.

Due to the restricted nature of land ownership in the region—with much of it owned by the federal government or timber companies—the Kiamichi Mountains remain rustic, rural, economically undeveloped and with few population centers.

== Climate ==
The Kiamichi Mountains experience a humid subtropical climate, with long, hot, humid summers, and short and cool winters. Temperatures below zero are very rare, but possible. Light snowfall usually occurs once or twice each winter, but rarely lasts more than 24 hours without melting. Substantial amounts of precipitation fall throughout the year. Summers can be extremely hot, and are usually very humid. Thunderstorms are common throughout the spring and summer. Higher elevations are substantially cooler than the valleys during the day, and tend to receive more precipitation throughout the year.

Climate data for Kiamichi Mountains, Oklahoma. (Elevation 2,440ft)
Month	Jan	Feb	Mar	Apr	May	Jun	Jul	Aug	Sep	Oct	Nov	Dec	Year
Record high °F (°C)	69 (21)	76 (24)	81 (27)	84 (29)	85 (29)	95 (35)	100 (38)	103 (39)	95 (35)	90 (32)	74 (23)	66 (19)	103 (39)
Mean daily maximum °F (°C)	46.1 (7.8)	49.2 (9.6)	57.3 (14.1)	69.1 (20.6)	76.9 (24.9)	82.0 (27.8)	85.9 (29.9)	86.7 (30.4)	79.4 (26.3)	70.4 (21.3)	57.7 (14.3)	48.6 (9.2)	67.4 (19.7)
Mean daily minimum °F (°C)	27.7 (−2.4)	29.8 (−1.2)	35.8 (2.1)	49.0 (9.4)	58.3 (14.6)	63.6 (17.6)	67.0 (19.4)	66.6 (19.2)	61.8 (16.6)	52.9 (11.6)	39.9 (4.4)	29.0 (−1.7)	48.5 (9.2)
Record low °F (°C)	−11 (−24)	9 (−13)	6 (−14)	25 (−4)	37 (3)	54 (12)	57 (14)	53 (12)	45 (7)	31 (−1)	13 (−11)	1 (−17)	−11 (−24)
Average precipitation inches (mm)	4.49 (114)	4.37 (111)	5.14 (131)	6.38 (162)	6.29 (160)	4.56 (116)	5.12 (130)	3.98 (101)	5.29 (134)	3.86 (98)	4.30 (109)	3.85 (98)	57.65 (1,464)
Average snowfall inches (cm)	2.0 (5.1)	1.4 (3.6)	0.7 (1.8)	0 (0)	0 (0)	0 (0)	0 (0)	0 (0)	0 (0)	0 (0)	0.1 (0.25)	0.6 (1.5)	4.8 (12)
Source: The Western Regional Climate Center

Climate data for Tuskahoma, Oklahoma. (Elevation 600ft)
Month	Jan	Feb	Mar	Apr	May	Jun	Jul	Aug	Sep	Oct	Nov	Dec	Year
Record high °F (°C)	78 (26)	87 (31)	93 (34)	96 (36)	97 (36)	107 (42)	112 (44)	114 (46)	112 (44)	101 (38)	87 (31)	80 (27)	114 (46)
Mean daily maximum °F (°C)	53.1 (11.7)	58.2 (14.6)	67.2 (19.6)	75.2 (24.0)	81.3 (27.4)	88.7 (31.5)	94.6 (34.8)	95.0 (35.0)	87.3 (30.7)	77.0 (25.0)	64.4 (18.0)	55.0 (12.8)	74.8 (23.8)
Mean daily minimum °F (°C)	29.1 (−1.6)	33.1 (0.6)	41.7 (5.4)	49.7 (9.8)	58.5 (14.7)	66.5 (19.2)	70.1 (21.2)	69.1 (20.6)	61.9 (16.6)	50.5 (10.3)	40.7 (4.8)	31.7 (−0.2)	50.2 (10.1)
Record low °F (°C)	−13 (−25)	−4 (−20)	5 (−15)	21 (−6)	32 (0)	40 (4)	47 (8)	47 (8)	32 (0)	18 (−8)	7 (−14)	−10 (−23)	−13 (−25)
Average precipitation inches (mm)	2.94 (75)	2.97 (75)	3.68 (93)	5.10 (130)	5.95 (151)	4.89 (124)	3.38 (86)	2.92 (74)	4.40 (112)	4.45 (113)	4.02 (102)	3.32 (84)	48.02 (1,220)
Average snowfall inches (cm)	1.7 (4.3)	1.3 (3.3)	0.4 (1.0)	0 (0)	0 (0)	0 (0)	0 (0)	0 (0)	0 (0)	0 (0)	0.1 (0.25)	0.4 (1.0)	4.0 (10)
Source: The Western Regional Climate Center
