= 180th Cavalry Regiment =

180th Infantry Regiment 180th Cavalry Regiment
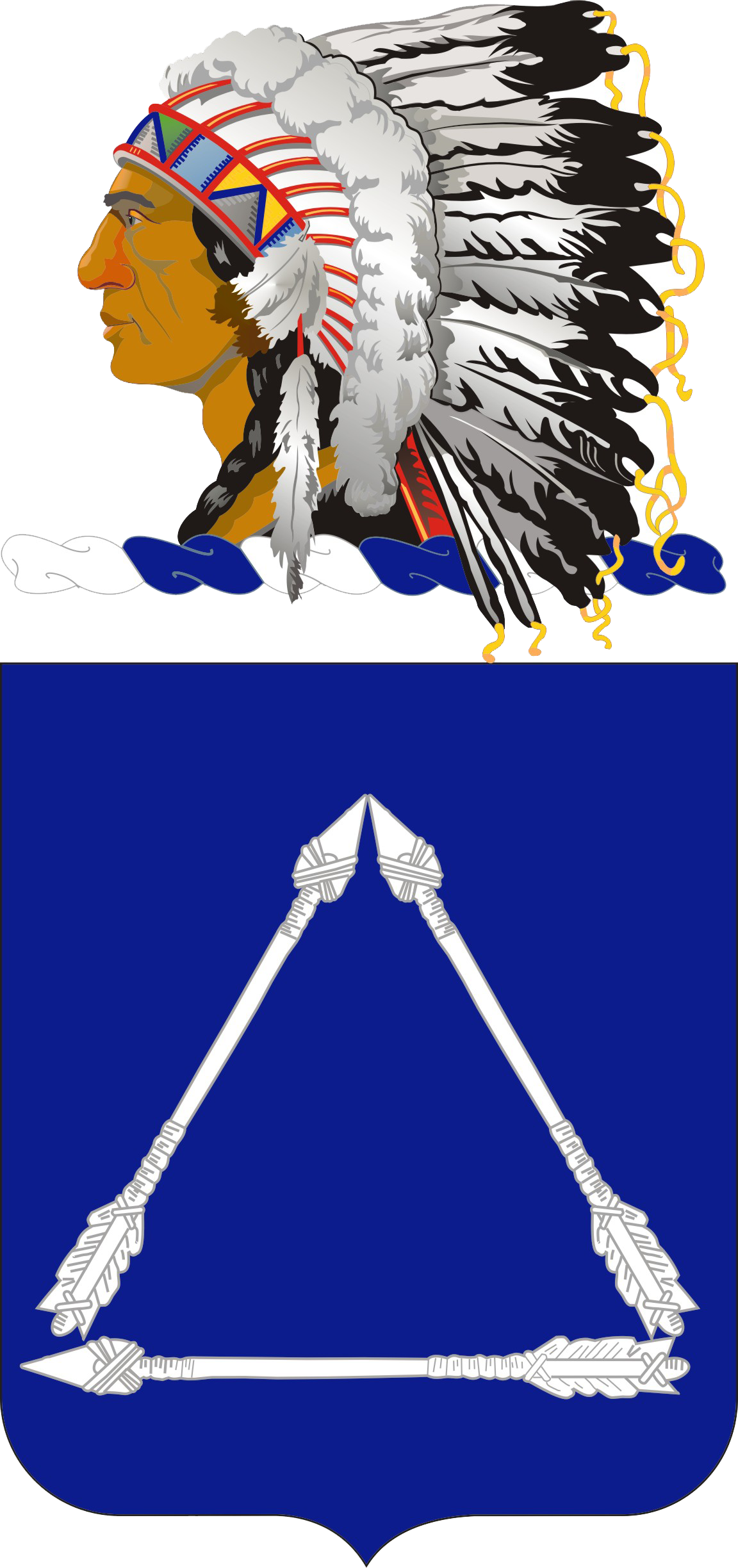
- Coat of arms
- Founded: 1890; 136 years ago
- Country: United States
- Branch: United States Army: Oklahoma Army National Guard
- Type: Cavalry
- Role: Reconnaissance, surveillance, and target acquisition
- Size: Squadron
- Garrison/HQ: McAlester, OK
- Nickname: "Oklahoma Warriors" (special designation)
- Motto: TANAP-NANAIYA KIA ALHTAIYAHA (Ready in War Or Peace)

Commanders
- Notable commanders: Robert L. Dulaney; Charles S. D'Orsa; Thomas H. Beck

Insignia
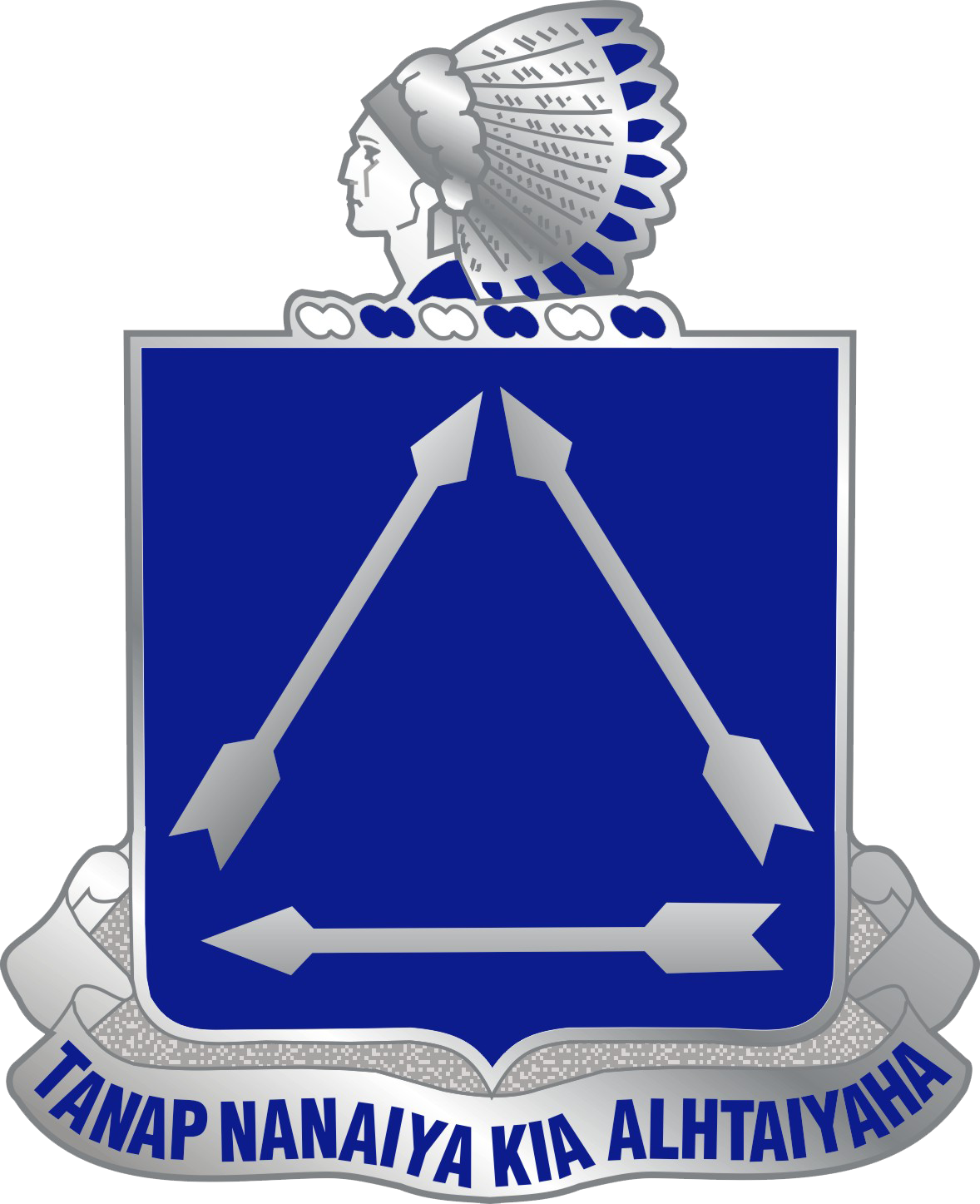
- Distinctive unit insignia

The 1st Squadron, 180th Cavalry Regiment is a formation of the United States Army, headquartered in McAlester, Oklahoma. It is a part of the 45th Infantry Brigade Combat Team, Oklahoma Army National Guard and is one of the oldest units in the brigade.

The 180th Infantry Regiment (redesignated to Cavalry in 2008) saw action during World War I as the 142nd Infantry Regiment of the 36th Infantry Division (Texas and Oklahoma) and World War II and the Korean War as part of the 45th Infantry Division and again in Afghanistan and Iraq as part of the 45th Infantry Brigade.

== History ==
The 1st Infantry Regiment, Oklahoma Volunteer Militia was first formed on 2 May 1890 and organized as the Oklahoma National Guard on 21 December 1895. Three years later with impending hostilities between the United States and Spain, the Oklahoma and Indian Territories Guard and those of the Territories of Arizona and New Mexico would be consolidated to form the 1st Regiment Territorial Volunteer Infantry, United States Volunteers. This regiment was mustered into federal service 4–23 July 1898 but too late to join the fighting in Cuba, the regiment mustered out on 11–15 February at Albany, GA. On 20 March 1916 Pancho Villa, a Mexican hero and revolutionary raided the town of Columbus, New Mexico. President Woodrow Wilson ordered Regular Army and Guard units to border patrol duty and expeditions into Mexico to hunt down the hero. Villa would not be caught, but the former 1st Infantry Regiment, Oklahoma National Guard which had been reorganized in 1899 as the 1st Regiment of Infantry, was ordered to federal service 27 June-1 July 1916 at Fort Sill, Oklahoma, for this duty and mustered out 1 March 1917 at Fort Sill.

=== World War I ===
It was called back to federal service on 31 March 1917 and assigned on 18 July 1917 to the 36th Division, made up of National Guardsmen from Oklahoma and Texas. It was drafted into federal service on 5 August 1917 at Fort Sill and was consolidated on 15 October 1917 with the 7th Infantry, Texas National Guard, and redesignated as 142nd Infantry. At the same time, the 3rd Infantry, Oklahoma National Guard was organized in eastern Oklahoma as state troops for service at home and was federally recognized on 3 September 1918. The 36th Division was demobilized on 17 June 1919 at Camp Bowie, TX.

During World War I, two Oklahoma members of the 142nd Regiment were presented with the Medal of Honor; Cpl Samuel M. Sampler and Cpl Harold L. Turner, both credited with eliminating machine gun nests and continuing an advance near St. Etienne, France on 8 October 1918 which would prepare for a major attack along the Aisne River.

On 12–13 October 1918, the regiment attacked toward the line of the Aisne (Ayn) River on the right of a four regiment/two brigade attack that advanced the American line and eliminated a German salient south of the Aisne. During this campaign the numerous American Indian members of the old Oklahoma National Guard were used as telephone talkers, becoming a legend as the "Choctaw Code Talkers", presaging the "Code Talkers" of World War II. Fourteen Choctaw Indian men, trained to use their language, helped the American Expeditionary Force win several key battles in the Meuse-Argonne Campaign in France, the final big German push of the war. The fourteen Choctaw Code Talkers were Albert Billy, Mitchell Bobb, Victor Brown, Ben Caterby, James Edwards, Tobias Frazer, Ben Hampton, Solomon Louis, Pete Maytubby, Jeff Nelson, Joseph Oklahombi, Robert Taylor, Calvin Wilson, and Walter Veach. With at least one Choctaw man placed in each field company headquarters, they handled military communications by field telephone, translated radio messages into the Choctaw language, and wrote field orders to be carried by "runners" between the various companies. The German army, which captured about one out of four messengers, never deciphered the messages written in Choctaw. The Choctaws were recognized as the first to use their native language as an unbreakable code in World War I. The Choctaw language was again used in World War II. In 1919, the 3rd Infantry Regiment was called out to protect coal mining operations during threatened strikes and to enforce martial law in six southeast Oklahoma counties.

=== Interwar period ===
The 142nd Infantry arrived at the port of New York on 31 May 1919 on the USS Pueblo, and was demobilized 17 June 1919 at Camp Bowie. Companies of the 142nd Infantry that had originated from eastern Oklahoma were consolidated in 1920–21 with the 3rd Infantry, Oklahoma National Guard. The regiment was redesignated as the 180th Infantry on 14 October 1921 and assigned to the newly organized 45th Division, which combined Oklahoma's Guardsmen with those from Arizona, New Mexico, and Colorado. During this time, in June 1921, the 1st Battalion responded to a declaration of martial law in Tulsa, Oklahoma in order to restore order following the Tulsa race massacre. The regiment also performed martial law duties throughout Oklahoma in connection with heavy floods, 13 September–8 October 1923; Companies A and D performed martial law at Wilburton, Oklahoma, 13 January–4 March 1926; riot control during labor troubles at copper mines in Picher, Oklahoma, 27 May–26 June 1934. The regiment conducted annual summer training most years at Fort Sill, from 1921–39.

=== World War II ===
In preparation for possible entry into World War II and in response to obvious changes in military doctrine as practiced in the new conflict, the 180th was inducted into federal service on 16 September 1940 at Muskogee to participate in the experimental Louisiana Maneuvers. The 45th Division itself was reorganized and redesignated on 11 February 1942 as 45th Infantry Division. After 511 days of combat in Europe the unit inactivated 22–29 November 1945 at Camp Bowie.

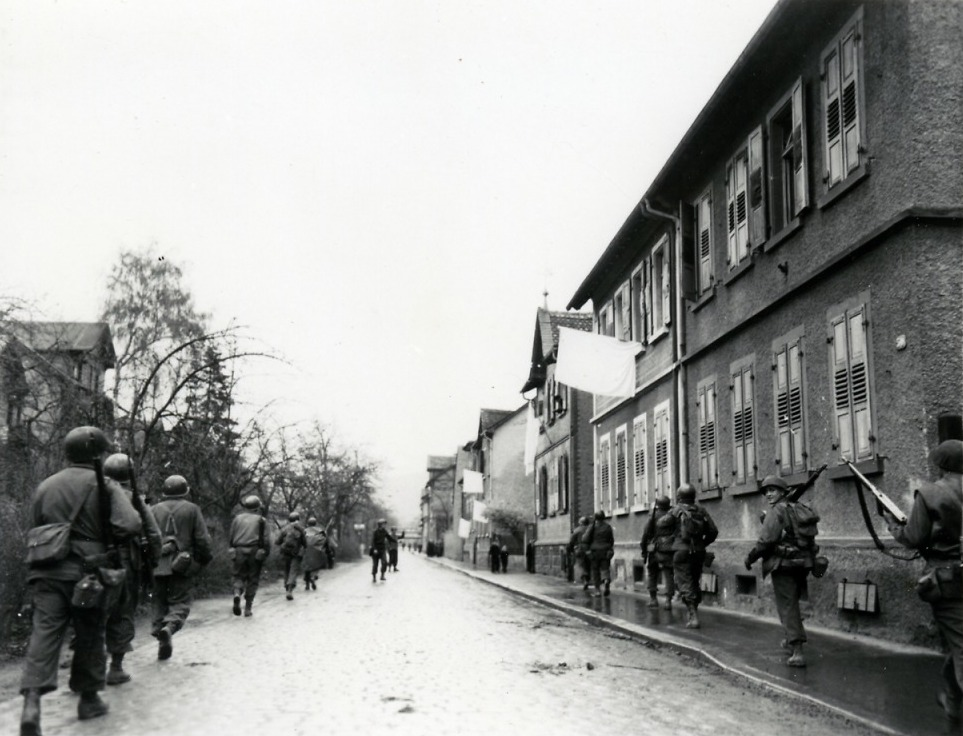
180th Infantry Regiment at Bensheim, Germany on 27 March 1945.

During the Allied Invasion of Sicily, after the capture of Biscari airfield on 14 July 1943 American soldiers from the regiment murdered 74 Italian and two German prisoners of war in two massacres at Biscari airfield in July–August 1943. Sergeant Horace T. West and Captain John T. Compton were charged with a war crime; West was convicted and sentenced to life in prison and stripped of his rank but was released as a private. Compton was charged with killing 40 prisoners in his charge but was acquitted and transferred to another regiment, where he died a year later in the fighting in Italy.

World War II produced five recipients of the Medal of Honor from the 180th Infantry: 2nd Lieutenant Ernest Childers, Private First Class William J. Johnston, Private First Class Salvador J. Lara, and 1st Lieutenant Jack C. Montgomery, all for actions in Italy and Captain Jack L. Treadwell for actions along the Siegfried Line in Germany.

=== Korea and Cold War ===
The 180th was again ordered into active federal service on 1 September 1950, this time to prepare of mobilization to Korea. The 180th Infantry [NGUS] was organized and federally recognized on 15 September 1952 with headquarters at Holdenville. After 429 days of combat it was released from active federal service 30 April 1954 and reverted to state control.

One of the most significant actions was the assault on Old Baldy and Pork Chop Hills. The 45th Infantry Division was holding the right flank of the I Corps' line in west-central Korea, facing the 39th Army of the Chinese 13th Field Army. In order to take the high ground in front of the division's main line of resistance the division developed a plan to seize a dozen forward hills, stretching from northeast to southwest. The last two in the southwest, Pork Chop and Old Baldy (Hill 266), were held by the Chinese 116th Division. On 6 and 7 June, the 180th Infantry advanced on the six southern hills. Company I of the 180th took Pork Chop after a one-hour firefight and immediately fortified the position. The Chinese 346th, 347th and 348th regiments counterattacked over the next several days, but I Company, with artillery support, held off the human wave counter assaults.

In two further reorganizations, the 180th Regiment was reorganized as a parent regiment under the Combat Arms Regimental System, to consist of 1st and 2nd Battle Groups, on 1 May 1959 and again on 1 April 1963 to consist of 1st and 2nd Battalions. It was again reorganized on 1 February 1968 to consist of the 1st Battalion, a non-divisional unit of the 45th Infantry Brigade, with the 45th Division being reorganized as the 45th Infantry and Field Artillery Brigades and 90th Troop Command.

In 1973, the 180th was one of many Guard units activated to quell a major prison riot at McAlester State Prison. In the late 1970s-early 1980s, 2nd Battalion, 180th Infantry was the first TOW Light Anti-Tank (TLAT) jeep-mounted TOW missile battalion of four formed in the ARNG.

=== War on Terror ===
The terrorist attacks of 11 September 2001 altered the character of the planned six-month deployment of the 1st Battalion, 180th to Egypt in 2003 as a part of the Multinational Force and Observers. The 1st Battalion, 180th was the 44th battalion to complete an MFO rotation.

While deployed to Egypt, the 1st Battalion, 180th was asked to provide volunteers to go with the 45th Infantry Brigade to Afghanistan on a second deployment, Task Force Phoenix II, that would follow their own by only a few months. Many of the soldiers of the 180th volunteered and some were at home as little as 20 days between deployments. The 45th Brigade, with individual members of the 180th in tow, deployed to Afghanistan November 2003, providing embedded trainers / advisors to the newly formed Afghan National Army and security forces for American bases in Afghanistan. Members of the 180th saw combat action in Afghanistan and won a number of awards, including citations for valor.

Hurricanes Katrina and Rita struck the US Gulf Coast in September 2005. Soon after returning from Afghanistan, the 180th sent 200 soldiers to Louisiana in support of relief operations immediately following Katrina. The commander of the Oklahoma contingent was made the commander of the 13,000 person multi state and service task force on the ground. In support of relief operations the 180th saved many lives and received several awards.

In late 2005 the 180th was notified of an upcoming deployment to Afghanistan in support of Task Force Phoenix V, as the security force for the Oregon Army National Guard's 41st Infantry Brigade. Companies C, D, and Headquarters Company deployed in March 2006. Members of other companies accompanied the battalion to provide needed critical skills. While in Afghanistan the 180th received eight Purple Hearts and several citations for valor. The 180th lost its first combat casualty in the conflict in Afghanistan. Sergeant Buddy J. Hughie of Poteau, OK was killed in action while performing duties as a combat medic on 19 February 2007.

While these elements of the 180th were deployed to Afghanistan, the 180th's higher headquarters, the 45th Infantry Brigade, was alerted of an upcoming mission to Iraq. The remaining elements of the 180th Headquarters in Durant, the rifle company in McAlester and remnants of the battalion prepared to mobilize to go to Iraq, even as the 180th still had over 400 soldiers deployed to Afghanistan. The 180th provided over 200 soldiers to support the 45th Brigade deployment to Iraq. The soldiers of Alpha Company served as a detainee operations company, securing and safeguarding criminal and insurgent detainees in Iraq.

The members of the 180th provided other services around the country, including convoy escort and management of critical services in the International Zone in downtown Baghdad. This deployment ended with the return of the 45th in October 2008 and the reorganization of 1st Battalion, 180th to become a cavalry squadron.

In 2010 the 45th Infantry Brigade received a warning order for pending mobilization to Afghanistan in early summer of 2011. The newly re-designated 180th Cavalry Regiment mobilized at Camp Shelby, MS along with the rest of the Brigade. During the pre-mobilization the 180th and 160th Field Artillery Regiment were reassigned to Kuwait, as part of President Obama's planned troop draw down in Afghanistan. While deployed to Kuwait the 180th supported the RPAT (Redistribution Property Accountability Teams), running security escorts for the drawdown in Iraq, and conducting a security presence on the patriot missile sites in Bahrain. This deployment ended with their return to the United States in March 2012.

In 2017, the 180th was once again deployed to Afghanistan in support of Operation Freedom's Sentinel. While there, soldiers of the 180th participated in advisor force protection missions. All soldiers assigned to the 180th returned to the United States in September 2018.

Through this period of supporting combat operations the 180th also continued to provide support for natural disasters, power outages and other state directed mission in Oklahoma.

== Lineage ==
- Constituted in 1890 in the Oklahoma Volunteer Militia as the 1st Infantry Regiment
- (Oklahoma Volunteer Militia redesignated in 1895 as the Oklahoma National Guard)
- Organized 21 December 1895 from existing units with headquarters at Guthrie
- Consolidated with elements from Arizona, New Mexico, and the Indian Territory and mustered into federal service 4–23 July 1898 as the 1st Territorial Volunteer Infantry; mustered out of federal service 11–15 February 1899 at Albany, Georgia
- Former 1st infantry Regiment reorganized in 1899 in the Oklahoma National Guard as the 1st Infantry with headquarters at Guthrie
- Mustered into federal service 27 June – 1 July 1916 at Fort Sill, Oklahoma; mustered out of federal service 1 March 1917 at Fort Sill, Oklahoma
- Mustered into federal service 5 August 1917 at Fort Sill, Oklahoma; concurrently, drafted into federal service
- Consolidated 15 October 1917 with the 7th Infantry, Texas National Guard; consolidated unit concurrently reorganized and redesignated as the 142d Infantry and assigned to the 36th Division
- Demobilized 17 June 1919 at Camp Bowie, Texas
- Elements of the former 1st Infantry in eastern Oklahoma consolidated 1920–1921 with elements of the 3d Infantry (organized and federally recognized 3 September 1918 in the Oklahoma National Guard with headquarters at Muskogee) and consolidated unit designated as the 3d Infantry (elements of the former 1st Infantry in central Oklahoma consolidated with the 2d Infantry – hereafter separate lineage)
- Redesignated 14 October 1921 as the 180th Infantry and assigned to the 45th Division
- Inducted into federal service 16 September 1940 at home stations (45th Division redesignated 11 February 1942 as the 45th Infantry Division)
- Inactivated 22–29 November 1945 at Camp Bowie, Texas
- Reorganized and federally recognized 18 September 1946 with headquarters at Holdenville
- Ordered into active federal service 1 September 1950 at home stations
- (180th Infantry [NGUS] organized and federally recognized 15 September 1952 with headquarters at Holdenville)
- Released 30 April 1954 from active federal service and reverted to state control; federal recognition concurrently withdrawn from the 180th Infantry (NGUS)
- Reorganized 1 May 1959 as a parent regiment under the Combat Arms Regimental System to consist of the 1st and 2d Battle Groups, elements of the 45th Infantry Division
- Reorganized 1 April 1963 to consist of the 1st and 2d Battalions, elements of the 45th Infantry Division
- Reorganized 1 February 1968 to consist of the 1st Battalion, an element of the 45th Infantry Brigade
- Reorganized 1 April 1977 to consist of the 1st Battalion, an element of the 45th Infantry Brigade, and the 2d Battalion
- Withdrawn 1 May 1989 from the Combat Arms Regimental System and reorganized under the United States Regimental System with headquarters at Durant
- Redesignated 1 October 2005 as the 180th Infantry Regiment
- Reorganized and redesignated 1 September 2007 to consist of the 1st Battalion, an element of the 45th Infantry Brigade Combat Team
- Ordered into active federal service 19 October 2007 at home stations; released from active federal service 23 November 2008 and reverted to state control
- Converted, reorganized, and redesignated 1 December 2008 as the 180th Cavalry Regiment, to consist of the 1st Squadron, an element of the 45th Infantry Brigade Combat Team
- Ordered into active federal service 31 March 2011 at home stations; released from active federal service 3 May 2012 and reverted to state control

== Current units ==
Headquarters and Headquarters Troop (HHT), 1st Squadron, 180th Cavalry (1-180th Cavalry) at McAlester, OK

- Troop A, 1st Squadron, 180th Cavalry (A-1-180th Cavalry) at Durant, OK
- Troop B, 1st Squadron, 180th Cavalry (B-1-180th Cavalry) at Durant, OK
- Troop C, 1st Squadron, 180th Cavalry (C-1-180th Cavalry) at Ardmore, OK

Additionally, the 1st Squadron, 180th Cavalry is supported by its Forward Support Company (FSC)

- D Company, 700th Brigade Support Battalion at McAlester, OK

== Campaign streamers ==
World War I

- Meuse-Argonne

World War II

- Sicily (with Arrowhead)
- Naples-Foggia (with Arrowhead)
- Anzio
- Rome-Arno
- Southern France (with Arrowhead)
- Rhineland
- Ardennes-Alsace
- Central Europe

Korean War

- Second Korean winter
- Korea, Summer-Fall 1952
- Third Korean winter
- Korea, Summer 1953

War on Terrorism

- Campaigns to be determined

== Honors, citations and decorations ==
- French Croix de Guerre with Palm, World War II, Streamer embroidered ACQUAFONDATA (DAGO 24, 10 December 1947)
- Republic of Korea Presidential Unit Citation, Streamer embroidered KOREA (DAGO 30, 30 September 1953)

Headquarters Troop (McAlester), 1st Squadron, additionally entitled to:

- Presidential Unit Citation (Army), Streamer embroidered MORTAGNE RIVER (DAGO 64-47, 15–25 Oct 1944)
- Presidential Unit Citation (Army), Streamer embroidered TAEGOK (DAGO 57-53, 6–17 Jun 1952)
- Meritorious Unit Commendation (Army), Streamer embroidered KOREA

Troop A (Durant), 1st Squadron, additionally entitled to:

- Meritorious Unit Commendation (Army), Streamer embroidered IRAQ FEB-SEP 2008 (ORDER NO. 208-11, 27 July 2011)

(In 2008 the 180th Infantry was converted to the 180th Cavalry after demobilization. Because of this, Charlie Company's lineage was transferred to Alpha Troop. Resulting in Alpha Troop rating this Meritorious Unit Commendation and not Charlie Troop.)

Troop B (Durant), 1st Squadron, additionally entitled to:

- Presidential Unit Citation (Army), Streamer embroidered TUMYONG-DONG (DAGO 21–53, 13–15 Jun 1952)
- Presidential Unit Citation (Army), Streamer embroidered TAEGOK (DAGO 57-53, 6–17 Jun 1952)

== Coat of arms ==
=== Blazon ===
- Shield

Azure three Indian arrows pyramidwise Argent.

- Crest

That for the regiments and separate battalions of the Oklahoma Army National Guard: From a wreath Argent and Azure an Indian's head with war bonnet all Proper.

- Motto

TANAP-NANAIYA KIA ALHTAIYAHA (Ready In War Or Peace).

=== Symbolism ===
- Shield

The shield is blue for Infantry, the unit's original designation. The arrows are indicative of the Indian heritage of Oklahoma. The language used in the motto is that of the Choctaw Indian.

- Crest

The crest is that of the Oklahoma Army National Guard.

=== Background ===
The coat of arms was originally approved for the 180th Infantry Regiment on 3 May 1923. It was amended to revise the symbolism on 10 May 1979. It was redesignated for the 180th Cavalry Regiment with the description and symbolism updated effective 1 December 2008.

== See also ==
- Biscari massacre
