= Tobias W. Frazier =

Choctaw code talker

Tobias Frazier
- Born: Tobias William Frazier; August 7, 1892; Sulphur Springs, Indian Territory
- Died: November 27, 1975 (aged 83); Rattan, Oklahoma, U.S.
- Burial place: Rattan Cemetery
- Military career
- Allegiance: United States of America
- Branch: United States Army
- Service years: 1917–1918
- Rank: Corporal
- Units: E Company, 142nd Infantry Regiment, 36th Infantry Division
- Conflicts: World War I
- Awards: Ordre National du Merite; Purple Heart

Tobias William Frazier, Sr. (1892–1975) was a full-blood Choctaw Indian who was a member of the famous fourteen Choctaw Code Talkers. The Code Talkers pioneered the use of American Indian languages as military code during war. Their initial exploits took place during World War I, and were repeated by other Native American tribes during World War II.

Frazier, in addition to his contribution to American history as a Choctaw Code Talker, also personifies the Choctaws' success in accommodating the changes brought about by Oklahoma's statehood, following the dissolution of their self-governing republic.

== Frazier Family Tree ==
After their arrival in the Indian Territory via the Trail of Tears, the Frazier family became leaders in Choctaw government and society. Tobias Frazier's grandfather, Robert, was elected a county judge of Cedar County, Choctaw Nation. Choctaw jurisprudence would be familiar to today's court officials, except for the role played by the judge: in the Choctaw Nation he was always a visible and influential leader of society.

Tobias Frazier's father, Reason J. Frazier, was a county ranger, or member of the "Lighthorse" serving Cedar County. Lighthorsemen were lawmen, and charged with keeping the peace.

Starting in 1832 Choctaw authorities, in mapping and laying out their new nation, created an orderly system of regional districts and counties, drawing their borders to conform to generally recognizable geographic landmarks. A prominent waterway known as Frazier Creek formed the boundary between Towson County and Cedar County. The creek took its name from the Frazier family. Frazier Creek is in northeastern Choctaw County and southeastern Pushmataha County in Oklahoma.

Fraziers have always been keen observer of Choctaw politics and government. Thirty years after the dissolution of Choctaw government one was still able to describe its political and legal system in intimate detail. "I think that we had the best laws in the country, and it would be better if we had the same laws now in the state," he proclaimed with pride in 1937.

== Early life ==
Tobias Frazier was born in 1892 in Sulphur Springs, Indian Territory, the county seat of what was then known as Cedar County, Choctaw Nation, in the Indian Territory. The territory later joined Oklahoma Territory in forming the state of Oklahoma in 1907.

Frazier attended Armstrong Academy, a school for Choctaw boys operated by the Choctaw Nation. While a student there he participated in the football team. Near the end of his life, when asked by a newspaper reporter what position he played on the team, he laughed and said "Anything but quarterback".

Upon the outbreak of World War I, Frazier enlisted in the U.S. Army and was later assigned to the 36th Division in France, where he served as a sergeant in the division's headquarters intelligence unit.

While serving in France the 36th Division found that German troops were able to intercept its communications. In addition, they were able to decrypt the military codes used by American forces. This enabled the Germans to successfully stymie and thwart American movements.

Several Choctaw Indians served in the 142nd Regiment of the 36th Division, and with the support of a commanding officer proposed using the Choctaw language as a military code.

== The Choctaw Code Talkers ==
Frazier and seven other Choctaw soldiers in the 142nd Regiment, noting the American army's communications predicament, devised, tested and deployed an innovative experiment, which entailed speaking in Choctaw while using a field telephone. Choctaws were placed in each company of soldiers to send or transmit information using their language as code. Runners were also employed to extend the system as necessary. Six additional Choctaws from other units were also brought to bear, for a total of fourteen code talkers.

The Germans heard the Choctaw language for the first time on October 26, 1918 during a "delicate" American withdrawal of two companies of the 2nd Battalion from Chufilly to Chardeny. The movement was successful.

"The enemy's complete surprise is evidence that he could not decipher the messages," the Americans' commanding officer observed. A captured German officer later confirmed they were "completely confused by the Indian language and gained no benefit whatsoever" from their wiretaps.

No Choctaw word or phrase existed to describe "machine gun". Frazier and his Choctaw colleagues improvised successfully, using Choctaw words for "big gun" to describe "artillery" and "little gun shoot fast" for "machine gun". "The results were very gratifying," their commanding officer observed.

One of Frazier's colleagues was Joseph Oklahombi–whose surname means "man killer" in the Choctaw language–Oklahoma's most decorated war veteran. His medals are on display in the Oklahoma Historical Society.

Frazier, Oklahombi, and their fellow Choctaw Code Talkers were honored posthumously by the Choctaw Nation, which in 1986 presented each the Choctaw Medal of Honor. France followed suit in 1989, awarding them the Fifth Republic's "Chevalier de l'Ordre National du Merite" (Knight of the National Order of Merit). The award is the highest that France may bestow. Frazier was also awarded the Purple Heart.

== Post-war Observations ==
"Code Talker" is a phrase coined during or after World War II. It did not exist during World War I, and Tobias Frazier was never known to refer to himself as one. In later years he described his wartime activities to family members as "talking on the radio", or field telephone.

Frazier was proud of the Choctaw language, his native tongue. He spoke it at home as a first language and was proud of its role in breaking the Germans' Hindenberg Line during the war.

Nonetheless, the Choctaw language did not have a future, he noted with sadness. "The language will be "dead" in the not-too-distant future, after which it will exist only in books", he told a newspaper reporter in 1966.

"My niece, for instance, who attends Rattan school, will have no need for the old tribal language," he told the reporter with surprising prescience. "Why should she learn it?"

Frazier, who died in 1975, is buried in the cemetery at Rattan, Oklahoma. Bill Frazier Road in Rattan is named for Frazier's son, who also served in the U.S. military.

== Legacy ==
The unique contributions made by the Frazier family continues through the present generation. Tobias Frazier's granddaughter, Beth Frazier Lawless, a school teacher in Rattan, Oklahoma, initiated a student research project in 1999 with international ramifications.

Ms. Lawless's students investigated the crashes during World War II of Royal Air Force pilots in the Kiamichi Mountains, erecting the AT6 Monument in their honor. Over 1,000 attended the dedication ceremony, many from Great Britain. The ceremony was covered live by the BBC, American television networks, and newspapers. It was attended by military officials of the United Kingdom and New Zealand, both of whom came from their countries' embassies in Washington, D.C., and by Britain's vice consul to the United States.
