= Edward C. Dahlgren =

United States Army Medal of Honor recipient

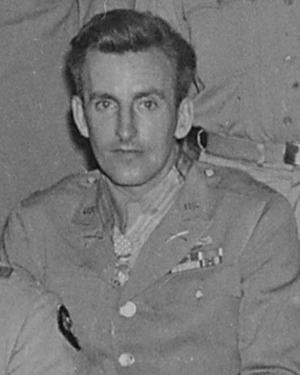
- Edward Dahlgren after receiving his Medal of Honor from President Harry S. Truman on August 23, 1945
- Born: March 14, 1916; Perham, Maine, U.S.
- Died: May 31, 2006 (aged 90); Caribou, Maine, U.S.
- Burial place: Pierce Cemetery, Mars Hill, Maine
- Military career
- Allegiance: United States of America
- Branch: United States Army
- Rank: Second Lieutenant
- Units: 2nd Battalion, 142nd Infantry Regiment, 36th Infantry Division
- Conflicts: World War II
- Awards: Medal of Honor

Edward Carl Dahlgren (March 14, 1916 – May 31, 2006) was a United States Army soldier and a recipient of the United States military's highest decoration—the Medal of Honor—for his actions in World War II.

== Biography ==
Dahlgren joined the Army from Portland, Maine in March 1943, and by February 11, 1945 was serving as a Sergeant in Company E, 142nd Infantry Regiment, 36th Infantry Division. On that day, at Oberhoffen, France, he repeatedly attacked German positions alone and captured many prisoners. He was subsequently promoted to second lieutenant and, on September 10, 1945, awarded the Medal of Honor.

Dahlgren left the Army while still a second lieutenant. He died at age 90 and was buried in Pierce Cemetery, Mars Hill, Maine.

== Medal of Honor citation ==
Dahlgren's official Medal of Honor citation reads:

He led the 3d Platoon to the rescue of a similar unit which had been surrounded in an enemy counterattack at Oberhoffen, France. As he advanced along a street, he observed several Germans crossing a field about 100 yards away. Running into a barn, he took up a position in a window and swept the hostile troops with submachine gun fire, killing 6, wounding others, and completely disorganizing the group. His platoon then moved forward through intermittent sniper fire and made contact with the besieged Americans. When the 2 platoons had been reorganized, Sgt. Dahlgren continued to advance along the street until he drew fire from an enemy-held house. In the face of machine pistol and rifle fire, he ran toward the building, hurled a grenade through the door, and blasted his way inside with his gun. This aggressive attack so rattled the Germans that all 8 men who held the strongpoint immediately surrendered. As Sgt. Dahlgren started toward the next house, hostile machinegun fire drove him to cover. He secured rifle grenades, stepped to an exposed position, and calmly launched his missiles from a difficult angle until he had destroyed the machinegun and killed its 2 operators. He moved to the rear of the house and suddenly came under the fire of a machinegun emplaced in a barn. Throwing a grenade into the structure, he rushed the position, firing his weapon as he ran; within, he overwhelmed 5 Germans. After reorganizing his unit he advanced to clear hostile riflemen from the building where he had destroyed the machinegun. He entered the house by a window and trapped the Germans in the cellar, where he tossed grenades into their midst, wounding several and forcing 10 more to surrender. While reconnoitering another street with a comrade, he heard German voices in a house. An attack with rifle grenades drove the hostile troops to the cellar. Sgt. Dahlgren entered the building, kicked open the cellar door, and, firing several bursts down the stairway, called for the trapped enemy to surrender. Sixteen soldiers filed out with their hands in the air. The bold leadership and magnificent courage displayed by Sgt. Dahlgren in his heroic attacks were in a large measure responsible for repulsing an enemy counterattack and saving an American platoon from great danger.

== See also ==
- List of Medal of Honor recipients
- List of Medal of Honor recipients for World War II
