= Conflicts with Ohio participation =

Overview of the various conflicts Ohio has been involved

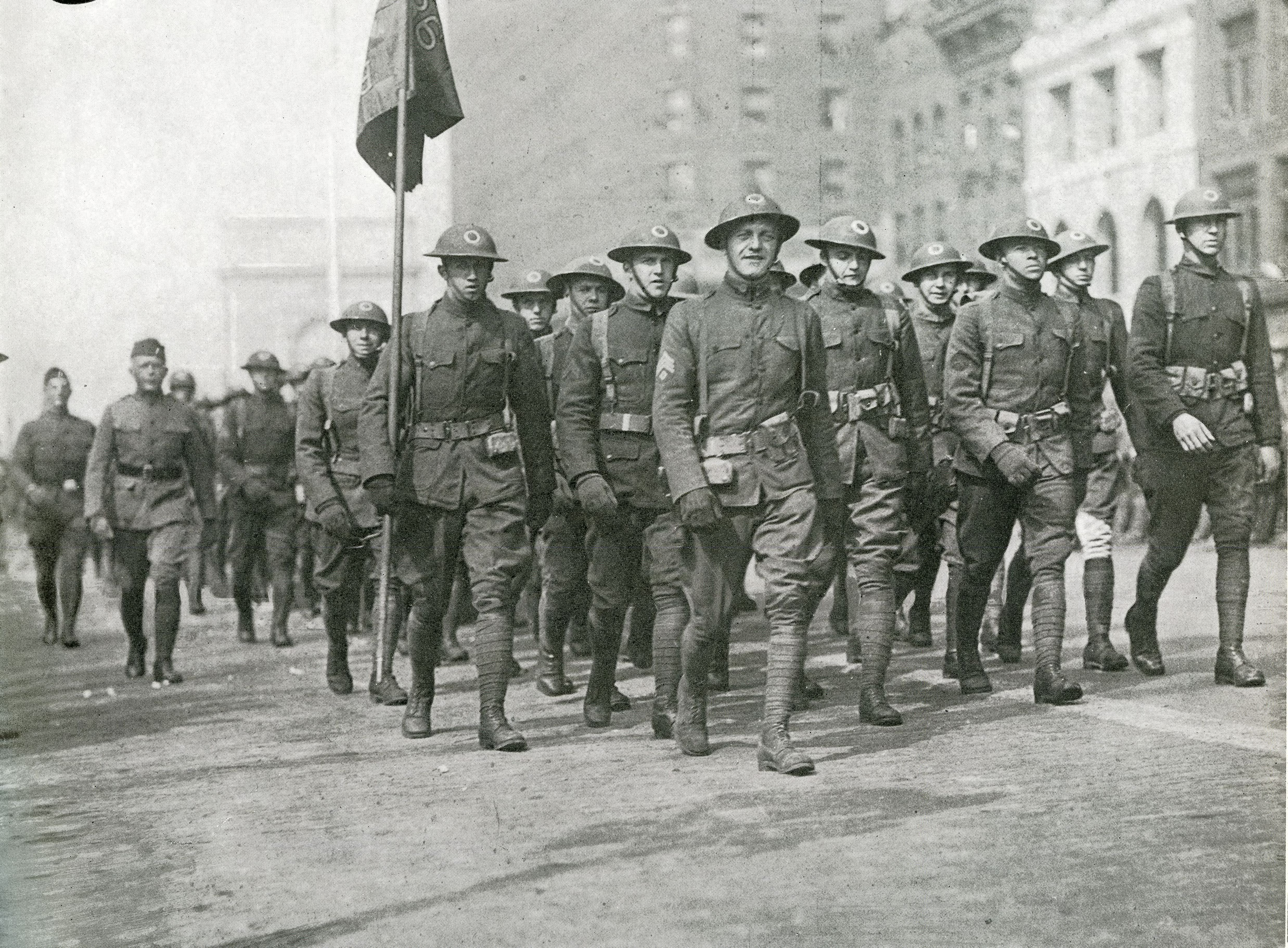
Members of the 136th Field Artillery arriving in Columbus after World War I on April 6, 1919

Ohio has been involved in regional, national, and global conflicts since statehood. As a result of the global conflicts, the American Veterans of Foreign Service was established in 1899 in Columbus, ultimately becoming known as the Veterans of Foreign Wars in 1913. The state has produced 319 Medal of Honor recipients, including the first recipient of the award in the country Jacob Parrott.

In 1886, the state authorized the creation of the Ohio Veterans Home in Sandusky and a second one created in 2003 in Georgetown to provide for soldiers facing economic hardship. Over 50,000 veterans have lived at the Sandusky location as of 2005. Since World War One, the state has paid stipends to veterans of wars, including recently authorizing funds for soldiers of the Gulf and Afghanistan wars. The state also provides free in-state tuition to any veteran regardless of state origin at their colleges.

== War of 1812 ==
Ohio was on the front lines of the War of 1812. Frontiersmen believed that British agents in Canada had provided rifles and gunpowder to hostile Native American tribes. At the same time Tecumseh's War started, the conflict in the Old Northwest between the U.S. and a Native American confederacy led by the Shawnee chief Tecumseh. He became an official ally of the British in 1812. William Henry Harrison's victory at the Battle of Tippecanoe in 1811, coupled with the defeat and death of Tecumseh in 1813, broke the power of the Natives. After 1815 the British no longer traded with the Native Peoples of Ohio nor provided them military supplies.

The Battle of Lake Erie was fought on September 10, 1813. Nine vessels of the United States Navy commanded by Oliver Hazard Perry defeated a Squadron of six ships of the Royal Navy near Put-In-Bay, Ohio.

== Michigan-Ohio War ==
In 1835, the Michigan-Ohio War broke out over the disputed Toledo Strip. Ohio, led by Governor Robert Lucas, marched into the strip in the spring of 1835. Michigan Governor Stevens T. Mason responded by marching an army into Toledo, destroying agricultural operations and seizing a prisoner of war. Following intelligence reports to the Michigan army that a vast army of Ohio sharpshooters had gathered to engage them, half of Mason's troops deserted and the rest withdrew. Michigan eventually ceded the Toledo Strip to Ohio through congressional diplomacy, and gained their northern peninsula in return.

== War of the Rebellion ==
Ohio's central position and its population gave it an important place during the War of the Rebellion. The Ohio River was a vital artery for troop and supply movements, as were Ohio's railroads. Ohio provided numerous senior commanders to the United States Army during the war. The experience of war shaped more than a generation of citizens. Five Buckeye veterans later served as President of the United States.

== Spanish–American War ==
The Spanish–American War broke out in 1898 while former Ohio Governor William McKinley was the President of the United States. Over 15,000 Ohioans participated in the military aspects of the war, losing 230 soldiers in the conflict, mostly because of disease.

== World War One ==
When World War I broke out in 1914, the United States was originally neutral. The sinking of the Lusitania paved the way for the country to enter the war. Camp Sherman was mobilized in the state as one of the largest military training installations for the war. Over 200,000 Ohioans served in the military during the conflict, suffering over 6,000 casualties. Eddie Rickenbacker of Columbus became one of the country's most respected heroes from the war.

=== Opposition ===
There was considerable opposition to the war in the state. Many European American generations recently removed from Europe brought with them their rivalries from that continent, including the Irish, Germans, and Italians. Isaac Sherwood was a lead anti-war politician from the state. Former U.S. President and Ohio native William Howard Taft started the League to Enforce Peace, which had support from anti-war political factions. In 1916, U.S. President Woodrow Wilson avoided endorsing the group.

=== Domestic fallout ===
Many German Americans in the state privately supported the German cause before the United States entered the war. They raised funds for Germany and sent their sons to fight in the German army. A backlash occurred when the country entered the war, and Ohio became a scene of pro-war terrorism. Columbus's German Village witnessed the persecution of many German Americans, who in majority usually voted Democrat but threw their support to Republican and future U.S. President and Ohio Senator Warren G. Harding in 1920 in response to Wilson's treatment of them during the war.

== World War Two ==
World War Two broke out in 1939 with the German invasion of Poland. Following the attack on Pearl Harbor, which saw three Ohioans awarded the Medal of Honor including Isaac Campbell Kidd of Cleveland, Robert R. Scott of Massillon, and James Richard Ward of Springfield, the United States declared war on the Axis powers. 839,000 Ohioans would serve in the conflict, with 23,000 casualties or MIAs. As recently as September 2010, Ohio MIAs from the war were still being found and returned to Ohio, such as Michael Chiodo, who was killed flying bombing raids over Germany. In total, the state would produce 27 Medal of Honor recipients from the war, including Harry Linn Martin, William Edward Metzger, Patrick L. Kessler, Emile Deleau, Joseph Cicchetti, Sylvester Antolak, Frank Joseph Petrarca, and Robert Craig.

Ohio played a key industrial role in the war effort, with factories mobilized to produce armaments and supplies. Tens of thousands of Americans flocked to the state seeking employment in the defense industries, including many from Appalachia.

=== Foreign POWs ===
Nearly 8,000 German and Italian prisoners of war were housed in Ohio, mostly located at Bowling Green, Ohio, Defiance and Celina.

=== Opposition ===
Prior to the outbreak, the German-American Bund had been active in the state promoting support for the Third Reich. They held rallies in Cincinnati and Dayton, which were countered by Jews in Cleveland who boycotted German-made products. There was opposition to the war, including from former U.S. Presidential candidate and Ohio Senator Robert A. Taft prior to 1941, who softened his position following Pearl Harbor. He contributed to the political assault on Roosevelt in the state during the 1944 campaign, and supported Ohio Governor John W. Bricker as Thomas Dewey's running mate that year, whose campaign fueled anti-war conspiracies, including Pearl Harbor advance-knowledge. Roosevelt would go on to lose the state after winning it in three previous elections.

=== Ohioans in concentration camps ===
Japanese Americans from Ohio were taken to concentration camps, including Kooskia in Idaho.

German Americans from Ohio were placed in the camps as well, including the Fuhr Family of Cincinnati who were interned at Crystal City. They experienced similar discrimination as in World War One, but not of the previous magnitude.

== Korean War ==
The Korean War began in 1950 when North Korea invaded South Korea. The United States was granted permission from the United Nations to intervene on behalf of South Korea, sending troops to the region under the control of the U.N. 1,777 Ohioans were killed in the conflict, and 4,837 wounded.

== Vietnam War ==
The Vietnam War was an American operation beginning in the 1950s to curtail the spread of communism in Vietnam. Following the Gulf of Tonkin incident, the United States escalated the operation into a war. Hundreds of thousands of Ohioans would serve in the conflict, resulting in 2,997 deaths and over 20,000 wounded and MIAs. 13 Medal of Honor recipients from the conflict were from Ohio, including Sammy L. Davis, Douglas E. Dickey, Michael J. Estocin, Charles Clinton Fleek, Frank A. Herda, Joseph G. Lapointe, Donald Russell Long, Melvin Earl Newlin, William Pitsenbarger, Gordon R. Roberts, Brian Miles Thacker, and David F. Winder. Beallsville is said to have lost more soldiers per capita than any other municipality in the country.

=== Mistreatment of veterans ===
Following the end of the conflict, many Ohio veterans returned home to an unwelcome environment. They suffered indignities, and double the unemployment rate of the average. Many were impaired with psychological trauma.

=== Opposition ===
There was opposition to the conflict in the state. Ohio baby boomers were active in the anti-war movement, and one of the most historic protests occurred in the state resulting in the Kent State Massacre. Neil Young's song "Ohio" was written in reaction to the Kent State affair.

== Gulf War ==
The Gulf War broke out when Iraq invaded Kuwait over an oil dispute. Ohio lost 16 soldiers in the conflict.

Public opinion toward U.S. intervention was generally favorable in the state, with only 31% objecting nationally at its highest level.

== Afghanistan and Iraq War ==
Following the 9/11 incident, the United States declared war on those they accused of being involved in the matter. This resulted in an invasion of Afghanistan in November 2001. As of July 2010, the state had lost 39 soldiers in the conflict with 309 wounded.

The country then declared war on Iraq in 2003. As of September 2010, the state had suffered 222 casualties, and over 1300 wounded.

=== Positive treatment of veterans ===
As opposed to the Vietnam War veterans, veterans of the Afghanistan and Iraq conflicts received positive treatment from both pro-war and anti-war environments alike. An estimated 200,000 Ohioans served in the Gulf, Afghanistan, and Iraq conflicts, and the state continued the tradition of paying stipends to citizens up to $1,000. They constructed a second veterans home for soldiers facing economic hardship as well as tax related legislation.

=== Opposition ===
==== Afghanistan ====
Following the rush to war in Afghanistan, the state was generally favorable of the conflict. Over time opinions changed, with a poll conducted by the Columbus Dispatch in July 2010 showing for the first time that Ohioans had turned against the war with 48% saying the country shouldn't be involved and 46% saying it was the right thing. By September polling by the Dispatch revealed only 35% believed the war was worth the cost.

Former U.S. Presidential candidate and Ohio congressman Dennis Kucinich became a vocal opponent of further involvement in the war.

==== Iraq ====
The Iraq war received opposition in the state from the beginning. Congressman Sherrod Brown, Stephanie Tubbs Jones, Marcy Kaptur, Dennis Kucinich, Thomas Sawyer, and Ted Strickland originally voted against authorization. The war became a central focus in the 2004 and 2008 presidential elections, and by September 2010 only 25% of Ohioans believed the war was worth it.
