= Willamette National Cemetery =

Veterans cemetery in Multnomah County, Oregon

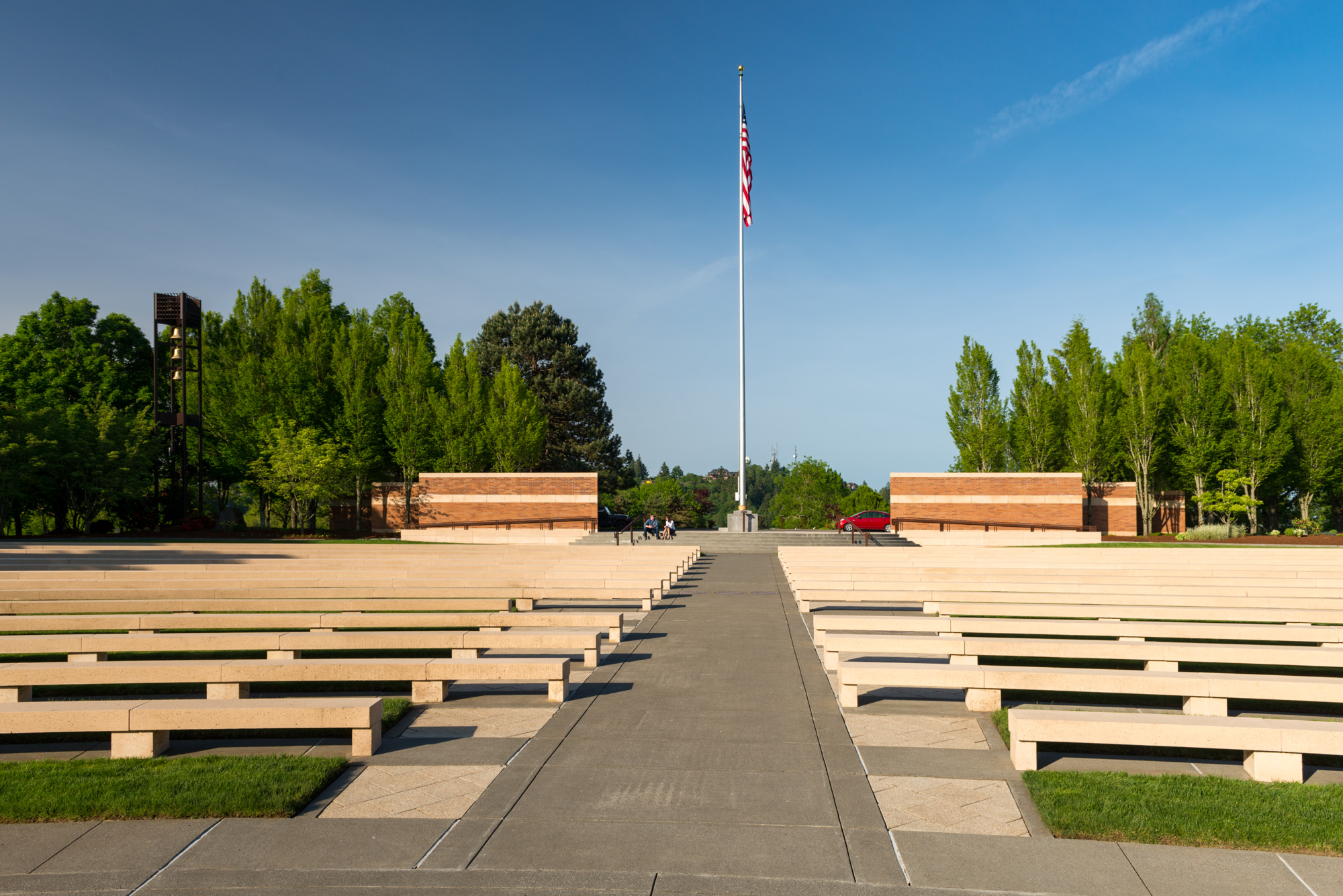
- Interactive map of Willamette National Cemetery

Details
- Established: 1949
- Location: 11800 SE Mt Scott Blvd; Portland, Oregon
- Country: United States
- Coordinates: 45°27′43″N 122°32′32″W
- Type: United States National Cemetery
- Size: 269.4 acres (1.090 km^{2})
- No. of graves: 188,000
- Website: US Dept of Veterans Affairs Willamette National Cemetery
- Find a Grave: Willamette National Cemetery

Willamette National Cemetery is a United States National Cemetery in Portland, Oregon located about 10 miles (16 km) southeast of downtown. Administered by the United States Department of Veterans Affairs, it encompasses 269.4 acres (109.0 ha) straddling the county line between Multnomah and Clackamas Counties. As of 2021, there had been 188,000 interments. It is one of three national cemeteries in Oregon (the other two being Roseburg and Eagle Point). On July 5, 2016, the cemetery was listed on the National Register of Historic Places. The cemetery is built on top of a wide Boring Lava Field cone.

== History ==
Plans to create a military cemetery in the Portland area started as early as 1941, and Franklin D. Roosevelt signed a bill to establish a national cemetery, but the necessary money to acquire the land was never allocated. Finally, in 1949 the state of Oregon donated 102 acres (41 ha) of land for the establishment of a National Cemetery. Construction was completed in 1950, and Willamette National Cemetery was officially opened on December 14 that year. The first interment did not take place until 1951. In 1952, another 100 acres (40 ha) of land were donated to the cemetery.

Willamette National Cemetery is a Blue Star Memorial Highway site.

== Notable monuments ==
- A Korean War Memorial, dedicated to the 283 people from Oregon who fought and died in that war.

== Notable interments ==
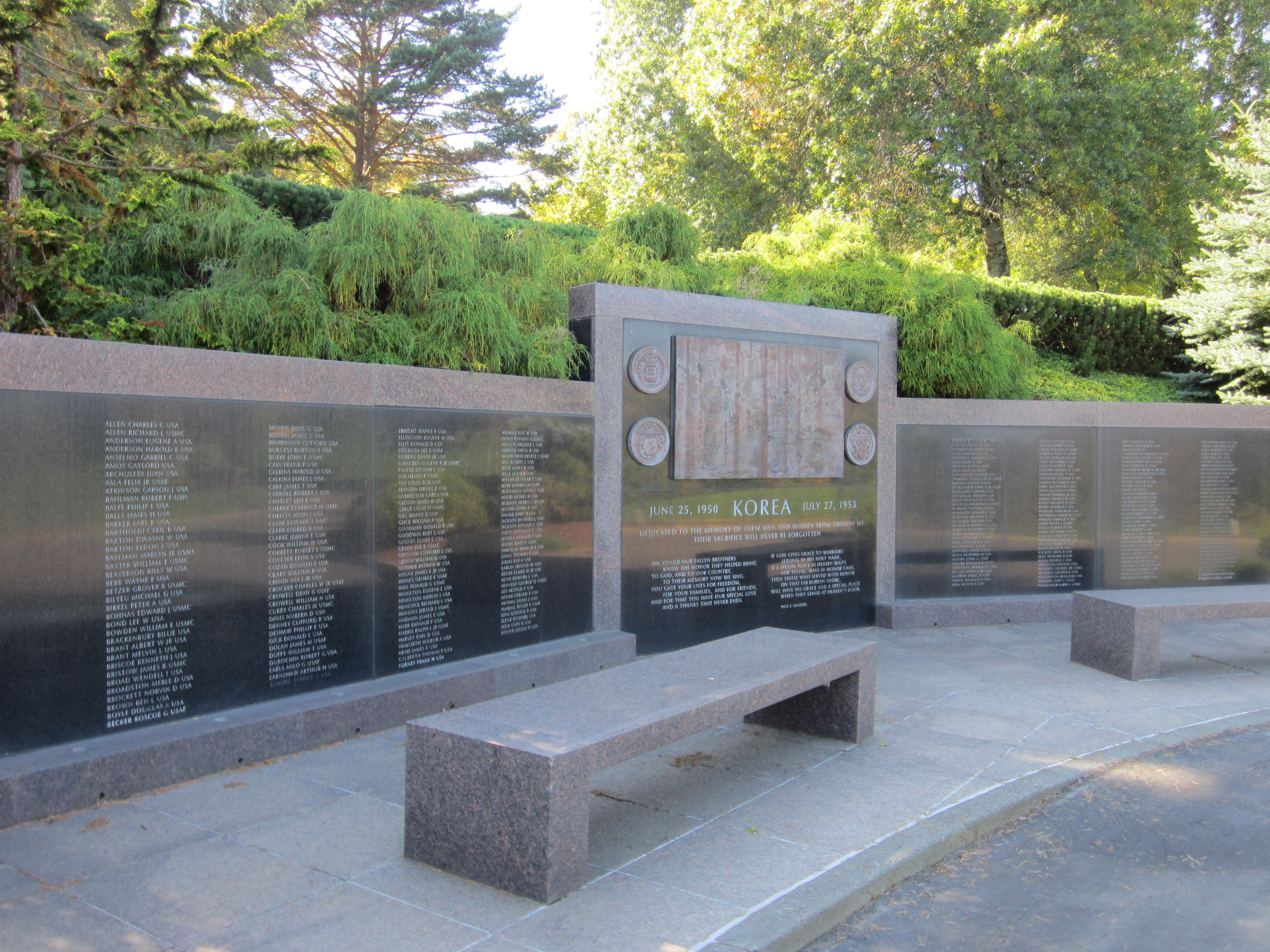
Korean War Memorial, 2013

- Medal of Honor recipients
  - Lieutenant Colonel Stanley T. Adams (1922–1999), for action in the Korean War
  - First Lieutenant Arnold L. Bjorklund (1918–1979), for action in World War II
  - Specialist Larry G. Dahl (1949–1971 †), for action in the Vietnam War
  - Sergeant First Class Loren R. Kaufman (1923–1951 †), for action in the Korean War
- Others
  - Alexander G. Barry (1892–1952), United States Senator
  - Harve Bennett (1930-2015), American television and film producer and screenwriter
  - Carson Bigbee (1895–1964), Major League Baseball player
  - Milt Davis (1929–2008), professional football player
  - George Freese (1926–2014), Major League Baseball player
  - Mark Hatfield (1922–2011), U.S. Senator and Governor of Oregon
  - Emerson C. Itschner (1903–1995), U.S. Army Chief of Engineers
  - Scott Leavitt (1879–1966), U.S. Representative from Montana
  - Donald Malarkey (1921–2017), World War II veteran
  - Thomas E. Martin (1893–1971), U.S. Representative and Senator from Iowa
  - Dane Paresi (1963 - 2009), United States Army Master Sergeant and military contractor for the CIA killed in Camp Chapman attack
  - Kenneth L. Reusser (1920–2009), United States Marine Corps aviator
  - Homer N. Wallin (1893–1984), United States Navy admiral
