= Emile Deleau Jr. =

United States Army Medal of Honor recipient (1923–1945)

- Born: June 28, 1923; Lansing, Ohio
- Died: February 2, 1945 (aged 21); Oberhoffen, France
- Burial place: Linwood Cemetery, Blaine, Ohio
- Military career
- Allegiance: United States of America
- Branch: United States Army
- Service years: 1943 - 1945
- Rank: Sergeant
- Unit: 142nd Infantry Regiment
- Conflicts: World War II †
- Awards: Medal of Honor

Emile Deleau Jr. (June 28, 1923 – February 2, 1945) was an American soldier who received the Medal of Honor for actions in France during World War II. He joined the Army from Blaine, Ohio in September 1943.

== Medal of Honor citation ==
Rank and organization: Sergeant, U.S. Army, Company A, 142d Infantry, 36th Infantry Division. Place and date: Oberhoffen, France, 1-February 2, 1945. Entered service at: Blaine, Ohio. Birth: Lansing, Ohio. G.O. No.: 60, July 25, 1945.

Citation:

He led a squad in the night attack on Oberhoffen, France, where fierce house-to-house fighting took place. After clearing 1 building of opposition, he moved his men toward a second house from which heavy machine-gun fire came. He courageously exposed himself to hostile bullets and, firing his submachinegun as he went, advanced steadily toward the enemy position until close enough to hurl grenades through a window, killing 3 Germans and wrecking their gun. His progress was stopped by heavy rifle and machinegun fire from another house. Sgt. Deleau dashed through the door with his gun blazing. Within, he captured 10 Germans. The squad then took up a position for the night and awaited daylight to resume the attack. At dawn of 2 February Sgt. Deleau pressed forward with his unit, killing 2 snipers as he advanced to a point where machinegun fire from a house barred the way. Despite vicious small-arms fire, Sgt. Deleau ran across an open area to reach the rear of the building, where he destroyed 1 machinegun and killed its 2 operators with a grenade. He worked to the front of the structure and located a second machinegun. Finding it impossible to toss a grenade into the house from his protected position, he fearlessly moved away from the building and was about to hurl his explosive when he was instantly killed by a burst from the gun he sought to knock out. With magnificent courage and daring aggressiveness, Sgt. Deleau cleared 4 well-defended houses of Germans, inflicted severe losses on the enemy and at the sacrifice of his own life aided his battalion to reach its objective with a minimum of casualties.

== See also ==
- List of Medal of Honor recipients for World War II
