= Charles Miller (businessman) =

American major general and businessman

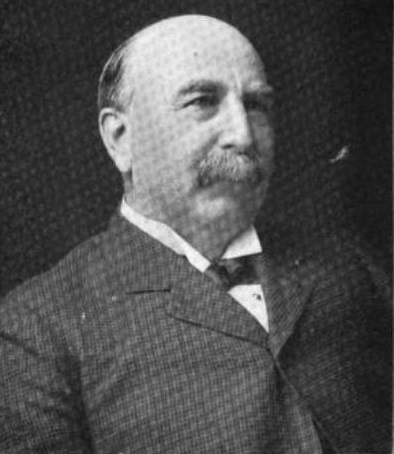
- Miller in 1899
- Born: June 15, 1843; Oberhoffen-sur-Moder, Alsace, France
- Died: December 21, 1927 (aged 84); Franklin, Pennsylvania, US
- Relatives: Joseph C. Sibley (Brother in law)
- Military career
- Allegiance: United States
- Branch: US Army; New York Army National Guard; Pennsylvania Army National Guard
- Service years: 1861–1865; 1880–1906
- Rank: Major general
- Commands: 2nd Brigade, Pennsylvania National Guard Division; Pennsylvania National Guard Division
- Conflicts: American Civil War
- Awards: French Legion of Honor (Chevalier).
- Other work: Businessman

Charles Miller (June 15, 1843 – December 21, 1927) was a Pennsylvania businessman, philanthropist and Major General of the Pennsylvania Army National Guard. He commanded the organization now known as the 28th Infantry Division and was a founder of the Galena-Signal Oil Company, which later became part of the Standard Oil combine, and then part of the corporations now known as Texaco and Valvoline.

== Early life ==
Charles Miller was born in Oberhoffen-sur-Moder, Alsace, France, on June 15, 1843. His family emigrated to the United States in 1855, settling in Boston, New York. Miller began a business career by clerking in stores and working as a sewing machine salesman.

In 1861 he joined the New York National Guard's Company A, 74th Infantry Regiment. The unit performed guard duty along the border with Canada in Pennsylvania and New York to deter Confederate raids from the north (as happened during the St. Albans Raid). He served until the end of the Civil War, and turned down an Army commission despite having performed well on the competitive examination. Afterwards Miller remained active in the Grand Army of the Republic.

== Business career ==
Recognizing the potential of the fledgling oil industry, in the late 1860s Miller moved to Franklin, Pennsylvania, and organized the Galena Oil Company in partnership with his brother in law Joseph C. Sibley. This venture, which eventually became the Galena-Signal Oil Company, played a key role in replacing animal-fat based lubricants in business and industry, and grew to become the primary supplier of lubricating oil to the railroad industry. He served as the company president until 1919. Galena-Signal eventually became a Standard Oil subsidiary, and then part of the conglomerates now known as Texaco (1928) and Valvoline (1931).

In addition to the oil business, Miller expanded his interests to include founding the Jamestown, Franklin and Clearfield Railroad, a subsidiary of the New York Central Railroad, of which he served as president. He was also president of other railroads, president and chairman of the board of directors for American Steel Foundries, and owned several Franklin businesses, including a bank, newspaper, a machine shop, and several farms.

In 1919 Miller left Galena-Signal and became chairman of the board of the Home Oil Refining Company of Texas.

== Political career ==
Originally a Republican, Miller served as Mayor of Franklin in 1885 and 1886. He later advocated temperance and became a member of the Prohibition Party.

Miller also served in appointive offices, including member of the board of trustees of the Pennsylvania Soldiers' and Sailors' Home.

== Philanthropy ==
Miller made charitable contributions throughout his hometown. He operated a night school at his own expense to enable Franklin residents to finish high school or receive training in business skills, and also made substantial donations to the local Baptist church, of which he was a founder, the YMCA, and the local library.

In addition, Miller served as a trustee of Bucknell University, where he endowed a fellowship.

== Military career ==
In 1880 Miller returned to military service as ordnance officer of the Pennsylvania National Guard's 2nd Brigade with the rank of major, where he served under commander James A. Beaver. He continued to serve on the brigade staff until 1898, when he was selected to command the brigade and promoted to brigadier general.

In 1900 Miller was appointed commander of the organization now known as the 28th Infantry Division and promoted to major general. He served as commander until retiring from the military in 1906.

== Awards and honors ==
Miller received an honorary Master of Arts degree from Bucknell University in 1896.

To recognize Miller's contributions to business and industry, in 1901 the government of France awarded him the Legion of Honor (Chevalier).

== Death ==
Miller remained active in his business and charitable interests almost until his death. He suffered a stroke in December, 1927 and remained in a coma for several days until his death on December 20. He was buried at Franklin Cemetery in Franklin.

== Family ==
In 1863 Miller married Ann Adelaide Sibley, the sister of Joseph C. Sibley. Their children included Adelaide Sibley Miller; Clarence A. Miller; Charles Joseph Sibley Miller; Henry S. Miller; Leroy S. Miller; Julius French Miller and Metta Evalina Miller. Charles Miller and his first wife later divorced, and in 1905 he married Emma Bulen. In 1910, the marital discord between Miller and his second wife was the subject of national headlines. Charles and Emma Miller later reconciled. The second Mrs. Miller died in Chicago in 1928.
