= Stanley T. Adams =

United States Army Medal of Honor recipient (1922–1999)

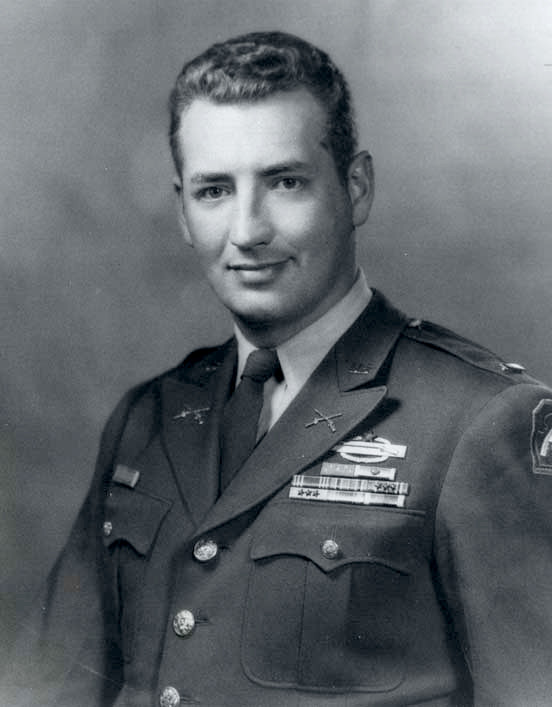
- Stanley T. Adams
- Born: May 9, 1922; De Soto, Kansas, U.S.
- Died: April 19, 1999 (aged 76); The Dalles, Oregon, U.S.
- Burial place: Willamette National Cemetery, Multnomah County, Oregon
- Military career
- Allegiance: United States
- Branch: United States Army
- Service years: 1942–1970
- Rank: Lieutenant Colonel
- Units: 19th Infantry Regiment, 24th Division
- Conflicts: World War II; Korean War; Vietnam War
- Awards: Medal of Honor; Bronze Star Medal; Purple Heart (2)

Stanley "Stan" Taylor Adams (May 9, 1922 – April 19, 1999) was a United States Army officer who received the U.S. military's highest decoration, the Medal of Honor, for his actions in the Korean War. A native of Kansas, Adams fought in World War II as an enlisted soldier. He was sent to Korea as a sergeant soon after the outbreak of war there, and was awarded the Medal of Honor for leading a bayonet charge against a numerically superior force in early 1951. Commissioned as an officer shortly after receiving the medal, Adams continued to serve into the Vietnam War, eventually retiring as a lieutenant colonel.

== Early life and World War II ==
Stanley Taylor Adams was born in De Soto, Kansas, on May 9, 1922. He joined the U.S. Army from nearby in Olathe in 1942. During World War II, he was wounded in action while fighting in North Africa and Italy.

== Korean War ==
After World War II, Adams served in Japan as part of the Allied occupation force. In July 1950, shortly after the onset of the Korean War, he was sent to South Korea as a sergeant first class with Company A of the 1st Battalion, 19th Infantry Regiment, 24th Division.

In late January 1951, the Eighth Army, of which Adams' unit was a part, launched a counteroffensive against Chinese forces. Company A established a position south of Seoul near Sesim-ni on February 3, and Adams' platoon set up an outpost on a ridge 200 yards (180 m) forward of the rest of the company. At about 11:00 that night, enemy troops assaulted and pushed back the companies to either side of Company A, leaving the unit surrounded on three sides. Two hours later, in the early morning of February 4, Adams' forward platoon was attacked by about 250 soldiers. After 45 minutes under intense machine gun and mortar fire, the platoon withdrew to the main company position.

Seeing that the opposing force could only be routed by close quarters fighting, Adams led 13 men from his platoon in a bayonet charge against approximately 150 enemy soldiers. He continued to fight in hand-to-hand combat for nearly an hour, despite being shot in the leg and knocked off his feet four times by grenades, until the hostile force began to retreat. When orders came for his battalion to withdraw, he stayed behind to provide covering fire. Adams was subsequently promoted to master sergeant and awarded the Medal of Honor for his actions during the battle. The medal was formally presented to him by President Harry S. Truman in a July 5, 1951, ceremony at the White House.

== Later years ==
Shortly after receiving the Medal of Honor, Adams was commissioned as a second lieutenant. He retired in 1970 as a lieutenant colonel.

He married Wava J. Ware Adams and they had a son, Gary. The marriage ended in divorce. He later married Penny DeGraff and they had a daughter, Joy. In 1981, he married Jean Elizabeth VanderStoep Adams, and was with her until his death.

As a civilian, Adams lived in Alaska and worked as an administrator for the Internal Revenue Service there. He later moved to Bend, Oregon, and, after being diagnosed with Alzheimer's disease, lived at the Oregon Veterans Home in The Dalles. He died in the veterans home on April 19, 1999, aged 76, and was buried at Willamette National Cemetery in Clackamas County.

Adams' widow, Jean, donated his Medal of Honor to the Oregon Veterans Home, where it is displayed in the entryway. Upon her death in 2008, she left a substantial contribution of funds and memorabilia to the home. A multipurpose building, to be named the Stan & Jean Adams Veterans' Community Center.

== Medal of Honor citation ==
Adams' official citation reads:

M/Sgt. Adams, Company A, distinguished himself by conspicuous gallantry and intrepidity above and beyond the call of duty in action against an enemy. At approximately 0100 hours, M/Sgt. Adams' platoon, holding an outpost some 200 yards ahead of his company, came under a determined attack by an estimated 250 enemy troops. Intense small-arms, machine gun, and mortar fire from 3 sides pressed the platoon back against the main line of resistance. Observing approximately 150 hostile troops silhouetted against the skyline advancing against his platoon, M/Sgt. Adams leaped to his feet, urged his men to fix bayonets, and he, with 13 members of his platoon, charged this hostile force with indomitable courage. Within 50 yards of the enemy M/Sgt. Adams was knocked to the ground when pierced in the leg by an enemy bullet. He jumped to his feet and, ignoring his wound, continued on to close with the enemy when he was knocked down 4 times from the concussion of grenades which had bounced off his body. Shouting orders he charged the enemy positions and engaged them in hand-to-hand combat where man after man fell before his terrific onslaught with bayonet and rifle butt. After nearly an hour of vicious action M/Sgt. Adams and his comrades routed the fanatical foe, killing over 50 and forcing the remainder to withdraw. Upon receiving orders that his battalion was moving back he provided cover fire while his men withdrew. M/Sgt. Adams' superb leadership, incredible courage, and consummate devotion to duty so inspired his comrades that the enemy attack was completely thwarted, saving his battalion from possible disaster. His sustained personal bravery and indomitable fighting spirit against overwhelming odds reflect the utmost glory upon himself and uphold the finest traditions of the infantry and the military service.

== Awards and decorations ==

Badge	Combat Infantryman Badge with star denoting 2nd award		
1st row	Medal of Honor	Bronze Star Medal Retroactively Awarded, 1947	Purple Heart with 1 Oak leaf cluster
2nd row	Army Good Conduct Medal	American Campaign Medal	European-African-Middle Eastern Campaign Medal with 3 Campaign stars
3rd row	World War II Victory Medal	Army of Occupation Medal with 'Japan' clasp	National Defense Service Medal with 1 Oak leaf cluster
4th row	Korean Service Medal with 3 Campaign stars	United Nations Service Medal Korea	Korean War Service Medal Retroactively Awarded, 2003
Unit awards	Presidential Unit Citation		Korean Presidential Unit Citation

== See also ==
- List of Korean War Medal of Honor recipients
