= William J. Johnston =

American soldier and Medal of Honor recipient

William J. Johnston, Sr.
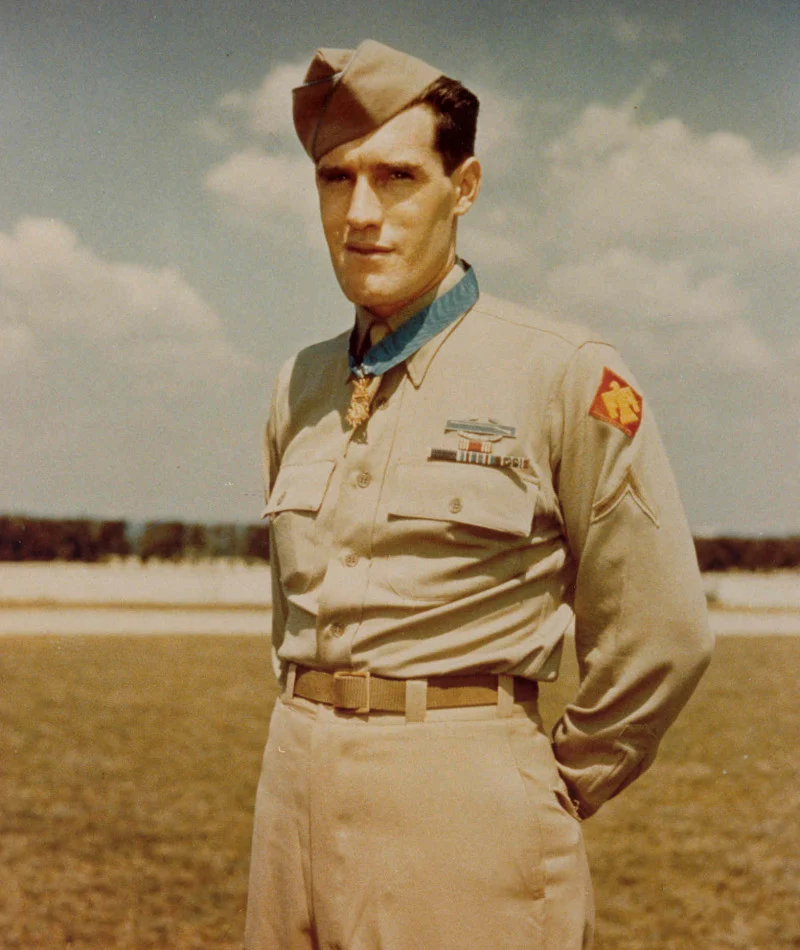
- Born: August 15, 1918; Trenton, New Jersey, U.S.
- Died: May 29, 1990 (aged 71); Newington, Connecticut, U.S.
- Burial place: State Veterans Cemetery, Middletown, Connecticut
- Military career
- Allegiance: United States
- Branch: United States Army
- Rank: Private First Class
- Units: 180th Infantry Regiment, 45th Infantry Division
- Conflicts: World War II
- Awards: Medal of Honor; Purple Heart

William James Johnston Sr., (August 15, 1918 – May 29, 1990) was a United States Army soldier and a recipient of the United States military's highest decoration—the Medal of Honor—for his actions in World War II.

== Biography ==
Johnston joined the Army from Colchester, Connecticut, and by February 17, 1944, was serving as a private first class in Company G, 180th Infantry Regiment, 45th Infantry Division. On that day and the following day, near Padiglione, Italy, he manned his machine gun without rest, twice staying behind to cover his unit's withdrawal. Although seriously wounded on February 18, he continued to man his gun until being overrun by German forces. He was able to make his way back to friendly lines on the 19th and provided valuable information on German positions. For these actions, he was awarded the Medal of Honor seven months later, on September 6, 1944.

Johnston left the Army while still a private first class. He died at age 71 and was buried in the State Veterans Cemetery, Middletown, Connecticut. A section of Connecticut Route 16 between Colchester and Lebanon is named in his honor, as is Colchester's public middle school.

== Medal of Honor citation ==
Private First Class Johnston's official Medal of Honor citation reads:

For conspicuous gallantry and intrepidity at risk of life above and beyond the call of duty in action against the enemy. On 17 February 1944, near Padiglione, Italy, he observed and fired upon an attacking force of approximately 80 Germans, causing at least 25 casualties and forcing withdrawal of the remainder. All that day he manned his gun without relief, subject to mortar, artillery, and sniper fire. Two Germans individually worked so close to his position that his machinegun was ineffective, whereupon he killed 1 with his pistol, the second with a rifle taken from another soldier. When a rifleman protecting his gun position was killed by a sniper, he immediately moved the body and relocated the machinegun in that spot in order to obtain a better field of fire. He volunteered to cover the platoon's withdrawal and was the last man to leave that night. In his new position he maintained an all-night vigil, the next day causing 7 German casualties. On the afternoon of the 18th, the organization on the left flank having been forced to withdraw, he again covered the withdrawal of his own organization. Shortly thereafter, he was seriously wounded over the heart, and a passing soldier saw him trying to crawl up the embankment. The soldier aided him to resume his position behind the machinegun which was soon heard in action for about 10 minutes. Though reported killed, Pfc. Johnston was seen returning to the American lines on the morning of 19 February slowly and painfully working his way back from his overrun position through enemy lines. He gave valuable information of new enemy dispositions. His heroic determination to destroy the enemy and his disregard of his own safety aided immeasurably in halting a strong enemy attack, caused an enormous amount of enemy casualties, and so inspired his fellow soldiers that they fought for and held a vitally important position against greatly superior forces.

== Awards and decorations ==

Badge	Combat Infantryman Badge		
1st row	Medal of Honor		
2nd row	Bronze Star Medal	Purple Heart	Army Good Conduct Medal
3rd row	American Campaign Medal	European–African–Middle Eastern Campaign Medal with 1 campaign star	World War II Victory Medal

== See also ==
- List of Medal of Honor recipients
- List of Medal of Honor recipients for World War II
