= Jack L. Treadwell =

United States Army colonel (1919–1977)

Jack LeMaster Treadwell
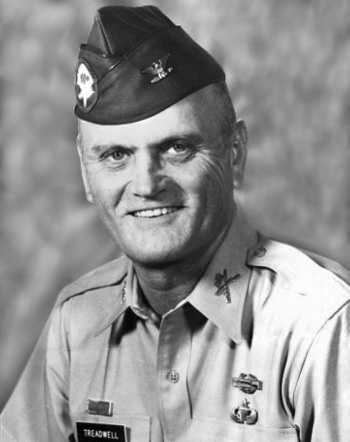
- Born: March 31, 1919; Ashland, Alabama, U.S.
- Died: December 12, 1977 (aged 58)
- Burial place: Fort Sill Post Cemetery near Lawton, Oklahoma
- Military career
- Allegiance: United States of America
- Branch: United States Army
- Service years: 1941–1974
- Rank: Colonel
- Units: 180th Infantry Regiment, 45th Infantry Division
- Conflicts: World War II; Vietnam War
- Awards: Medal of Honor; Distinguished Service Cross; Silver Star; Legion of Merit (4); Distinguished Flying Cross; Soldier's Medal; Bronze Star Medal (3); Purple Heart (4); Meritorious Service Medal; Air Medal (13)

Jack LeMaster Treadwell (March 31, 1919 – December 12, 1977) was a United States Army colonel and a recipient of the United States military's highest decoration for valor—the Medal of Honor—for his actions in World War II. At the time of his retirement, Treadwell was believed to be the most decorated man in the United States Armed Forces.

== Early life ==
Treadwell was born on March 30, 1919, in Ashland, Alabama. He graduated from Snyder High School in 1937 and attended Southwestern State College in Weatherford, Oklahoma in 1937 and 1938. Treadwell enlisted in the U.S. Army from Snyder, Oklahoma on January 29, 1941, and was trained as an infantryman.

== Military career ==
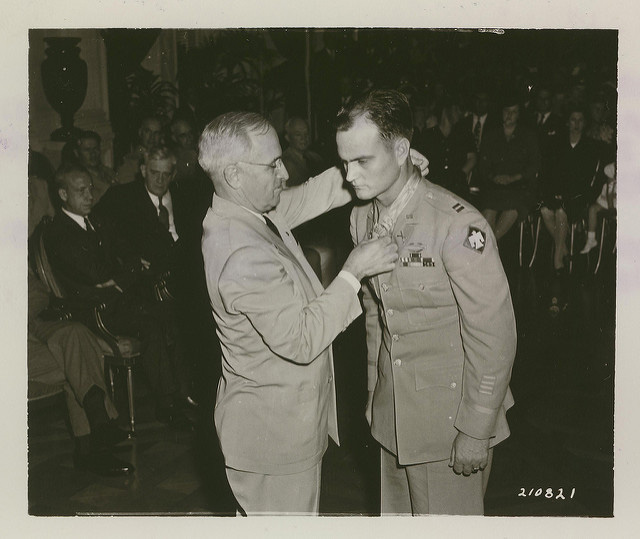
President Harry S. Truman presents Treadwell with the Medal of Honor (August 23, 1945)

=== World War II ===
He served with the 180th Infantry Regiment of the 45th Infantry Division throughout World War II. He deployed with the unit to North Africa in June 1943, participating in the amphibious assault on Sicily in July 1943, Salerno in September 1943, Southern France in August 1944 and also served in Alsace and Rhineland Campaigns. He received a battlefield commission on March 23, 1944.

=== Medal of Honor action ===
By March 18, 1945 was serving as a first lieutenant in command of Company F, 180th Infantry Regiment, 45th Infantry Division. During a battle on that day, near Nieder-Wurzbach in Germany, Treadwell single-handedly captured six German bunkers. He was subsequently promoted to captain and, on September 14, 1945, awarded the Medal of Honor. Treadwell was wounded in March 1945, and after hospitalization, he returned to duty with the Infantry School at Fort Benning in March 1946.

According to Signal Corps photo 210821, Treadwell received his MOH from President Truman on 23 August 1945.

=== Post war ===
Treadwell's next assignment was with the 7th Infantry Regiment at Fort Devens, from April 1948 to September 1949, followed by attending the Armored School at Fort Knox, from September 1949 to August 1950. Treadwell served as a company commander and executive officer with the 350th Infantry Regiment in Austria from August 1950 to December 1952, and then as Aide-de-Camp to the commander of First United States Army at Fort Jay from December 1952 to July 1954.

He next completed Command and General Staff College at Fort Leavenworth and then served as the headquarters commandant of the Army Forces on the Eniwetok Atoll in the Marshall Islands from September 1955 to September 1956. Treadwell returned to the United States Army Infantry School at Fort Benning from September 1956 to August 1958, followed by Armed Forces Staff College at Norfolk, Virginia, from August 1958 to February 1959.

His next assignment was at Fort Sam Houston, from February 1959 to August 1961, followed by Army War College at from August 1961 to September 1962. Treadwell next completed a degree program at the University of Omaha from September 1962 to July 1963, and then served on as the staff of United States Army Europe and as a battalion commander in West Germany from July 1963 to July 1966. He served as the Chief of the Army Infantry Center at Fort Benning from July to November 1966, and then served as commander of the 197th Infantry Brigade at Fort Benning until August 1968.

=== Vietnam War ===
Treadwell served as Chief of Staff of the Americal Division in Vietnam from October 1968 to March 1969, and then as commander of the 11th Infantry Brigade in Vietnam from March to September 1969. He served in Vietnam where he made over 100 parachute jumps. He participated in three campaigns in Vietnam: the Vietnam Counteroffensive Phase 5, Vietnam Counteroffensive Phase 6 and the Tet Offensive.

=== Post war ===
In June 1970, he was presented the Oklahoma Distinguished Service Cross in recognition of extraordinary heroism involving great personal danger and risk of life in the line of military duty and for outstanding service to the Oklahoma Army National Guard during the period 1941 till 1970. He was presented the state's highest decoration for extraordinary heroism was made by then Governor Dewey Bartlett.

After Vietnam, Treadwell served with Headquarters Fourth United States Army (redesignated Fifth United States Army in June 1971) at Fort Sam Houston from October 1969 to June 1972, followed by service as Senior Army Advisor to the U.S. Army Reserve at Columbia, South Carolina, from July 1972.

After more than 33 years service, Treadwell retired on Wednesday, Feb. 27, 1974 in retirement ceremonies held at the Fort Jackson Officer's Open Mess at 10:30 A.M. Major General William H. Blakefield, commander, Readiness Region II, presented Treadwell with the third oak leaf cluster for his Legion of Merit, for exceptional meritorious conduct from July 1972 through February 1974, while assigned as the Senior Army Advisor, 120th Army Reserve Command, U.S. Army Readiness Region III. Treadwell was also presented a Certificate of Appreciation from Creighton Abrams, the Chief of Staff of the United States Army.

== Later life ==
Treadwell was married to Maxine Johnson of Mooresville, Indiana, an Army nurse whom he met while he was recuperating in France from his most serious wound (a ricochet through his neck and chest).

After retiring, Treadwell and his wife settled in Oklahoma, where they planned to raise horses. The Treadwells have three daughters, two of whom are married to officers in the U.S. Army. Treadwell died aged 58 on 12 December 1977 following open-heart bypass surgery. He is buried with full military honors at the Fort Sill Post Cemetery near Lawton, Oklahoma.

== Awards and decorations ==
In addition to the Medal of Honor, Treadwell also received the Distinguished Service Cross, Silver Star, Legion of Merit with three oak leaf clusters, Distinguished Flying Cross, Soldier's Medal, Bronze Star with V device and two oak leaf clusters, Purple Heart with three oak leaf clusters, Meritorious Service Medal, Air Medal with Award numeral 13 and Army Commendation Medal. His awards also include, the Combat Infantryman Badge and the Senior Parachutist Badge. He has also been awarded the French Croix de Guerre with Silver-Gilt Star and the Vietnamese Cross of Gallantry with Gold Star.

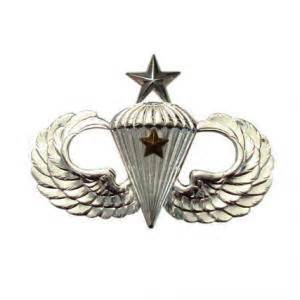

Combat Infantryman Badge
Senior Parachutist Badge (1 combat jump)
Medal of Honor	Distinguished Service Cross	Silver Star
Legion of Merit with 3 bronze oak leaf clusters	Distinguished Flying Cross	Soldier's Medal
Bronze Star with Valor device and 2 bronze oak leaf clusters	Purple Heart with 3 bronze oak leaf clusters	Meritorious Service Medal
Air Medal with Award numeral 13	Army Commendation Medal	Army Good Conduct Medal
American Defense Service Medal	American Campaign Medal	European–African–Middle Eastern Campaign Medal with Arrowhead Device, 1 3/16" Silver Star, and 3 3/16" Bronze Stars
European–African–Middle Eastern Campaign Medal (second ribbon required for accouterment spacing)	World War II Victory Medal	Army of Occupation Medal with 'Germany' clasp
National Defense Service Medal with 3/16" Bronze Star	Vietnam Service Medal with 3 3/16" Bronze Stars	French Croix de Guerre with Silver-Gilt Star
Republic of Vietnam Gallantry Cross with Gold Star	Vietnam Armed Forces Honor Medal (1st Class)	Vietnam Campaign Medal

Army Presidential Unit Citation	Vietnam Gallantry Cross Unit Citation

=== Medal of Honor citation ===
Medal of Honor

Treadwell's official Medal of Honor citation reads:

Capt. Treadwell (then 1st Lt.), commanding officer of Company F, near Nieder-Wurzbach, Germany, in the Siegfried line, single-handedly captured 6 pillboxes and 18 prisoners. Murderous enemy automatic and rifle fire with intermittent artillery bombardments had pinned down his company for hours at the base of a hill defended by concrete fortifications and interlocking trenches. Eight men sent to attack a single point had all become casualties on the bare slope when Capt. Treadwell, armed with a submachinegun and handgrenades, went forward alone to clear the way for his stalled company. Over the terrain devoid of cover and swept by bullets, he fearlessly advanced, firing at the aperture of the nearest pillbox and, when within range, hurling grenades at it. He reached the pillbox, thrust the muzzle of his gun through the port, and drove 4 Germans out with their hands in the air. A fifth was found dead inside. Waving these prisoners back to the American line, he continued under terrible, concentrated fire to the next pillbox and took it in the same manner. In this fort he captured the commander of the hill defenses, whom he sent to the rear with the other prisoners. Never slackening his attack, he then ran across the crest of the hill to a third pillbox, traversing this distance in full view of hostile machine gunners and snipers. He was again successful in taking the enemy position. The Germans quickly fell prey to his further rushes on 3 more pillboxes in the confusion and havoc caused by his whirlwind assaults and capture of their commander. Inspired by the electrifying performance of their leader, the men of Company F stormed after him and overwhelmed resistance on the entire hill, driving a wedge into the Siegfried line and making it possible for their battalion to take its objective. By his courageous willingness to face nearly impossible odds and by his overwhelming one-man offensive, Capt. Treadwell reduced a heavily fortified, seemingly impregnable enemy sector.

=== Distinguished Service Cross citation ===
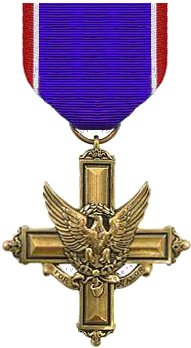
Army Distinguished Service Cross

Treadwell's official Distinguished Service Cross citation reads:

The President of the United States of America, authorized by Act of Congress July 9, 1918, takes pleasure in presenting the Distinguished Service Cross to Second Lieutenant (Infantry) Jack LeMaster Treadwell, United States Army, for extraordinary heroism in connection with military operations against an armed enemy while serving with Company F, 180th Infantry Regiment, 45th Infantry Division, in action against enemy forces on 24 May 1944, near Carano, Italy. When an attack by a superior enemy force threatened the security of his company position, Lieutenant Treadwell, weapons platoon leader of a rifle company, promptly brought the fire of his weapons platoon to bear on the enemy. Small groups of enemy under cover of artillery and mortar fire had advanced to within fifty yards of the company position and were beginning to infiltrate through the lines. Lieutenant Treadwell, knowing that two of the rifle platoons were without officers, quickly reorganized them to meet each new thrust of the enemy. Working under heavy fire, Lieutenant Treadwell excellent leadership as he moved from squad to squad over a 400 yard front, controlling the defense of the positions. While directing friendly artillery and mortar fire during this engagement, Lieutenant Treadwell adjusted fire on the enemy positions extremely close to his observation post. Closing with the enemy in fierce hand-to-hand combat, Lieutenant Treadwell inspired his men to a vicious and successful defense of their positions.

== See also ==
- List of Medal of Honor recipients
- List of Medal of Honor recipients for World War II
