= 142nd Infantry Regiment (United States) =

- Coat of arms
- Active: 1917 - Present
- Country: United States
- Allegiance: Texas
- Branch: Texas Army National Guard
- Type: Infantry
- Size: Regiment
- Motto: "I'll Face You"

Commanders
- Notable commanders: A. W. Bloor; Troy H. Middleton☆ George E. Lynch

Insignia
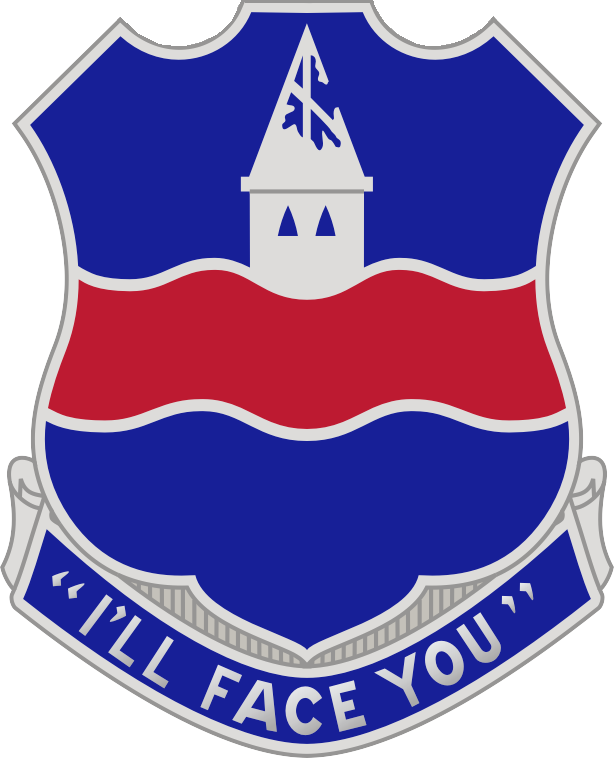
- Distinctive Unit Insignia

The 142nd Infantry Regiment is an infantry regiment in the U.S. Army National Guard. 2nd Battalion, 142nd Infantry carries the regiment's legacy as a unit of the 56th Infantry Brigade Combat Team, 36th Infantry Division. Eleven of its members have been decorated with the United States highest award for bravery, the Medal of Honor.

Members of the 142nd arriving as reinforcements tipped the Battle for Castle Itter in favor of a combined U.S. Army/Wehrmacht defense against a Waffen SS attack, the second and last time German and American forces fought side-by-side in World War II.

== History ==
=== World War I ===
The 142nd Infantry Regiment was constituted on 5 May 1917 as the 7th Infantry Regiment, Texas National Guard. It was organized from May‑July 1917 with headquarters federally recognized 29 July 1917. Called and drafted into federal Service 5 August 1917. On 15 October 1917, it was consolidated with the 1st Oklahoma Infantry Regiment and redesignated the 142nd Infantry Regiment, part of the 71st Infantry Brigade, 36th Division. It moved overseas in July 1918. During the Meuse–Argonne offensive, the 142nd used Choctaw code talkers. The 142nd Infantry Regiment had Native Americans (Indians) from 14 tribes in its ranks. One company was made up almost entirely of Indians from Oklahoma. A few Indians became officers.

=== Interwar period ===
The 142nd Infantry arrived at the port of New York on 31 May 1919 on the USS Pueblo and was demobilized on 17 June 1919 at Camp Travis, Texas. It was reconstituted in the National Guard on 3 December 1920, assigned to the 36th Division, and allotted to the state of Texas. The regiment was further allotted to the 71st Infantry Brigade and reorganized in the northwestern part of the state. The regimental headquarters was reorganized and federally recognized on 16 May 1922 at Amarillo, Texas. The headquarters was relocated 21 August 1928 to Fort Worth, Texas. The regiment, or elements thereof, was called up to perform the following state duties: 2nd and 3rd Battalions to perform riot control during a workers’ strike on the Missouri–Kansas–Texas Railroad at Denison, Texas, 23 July–21 October 1922; flood relief duties along the Colorado River at Brady, Texas, in July 1938. It conducted annual summer training most years at Camp Mabry, Texas, from 1922–25, and Camp Hulen, Texas, from 1926–39. It was inducted into active federal service at home stations on 25 November 1940 and moved to Camp Bowie, Texas, where it arrived on 13 December 1940.

Armories of the regiment in 1940

=== Postwar ===
The regiment was inactivated 15 December 1945 at Camp Patrick Henry, Virginia. It was reorganized with the regimental headquarters federally recognized on 26 February 1947 at Amarillo.

== Coat of arms ==
=== Blazon ===
- Shield

Azure, a fess wavy Gules fimbriated Argent, issuant in chief the shell-torn church steeple at St. Etienne, France, of the third.

- Crest

That for the regiments and separate battalions of the Texas Army National Guard: On a wreath of the colors Argent and Azure, a mullet Argent encircled by a garland of live oak and olive Proper. Motto "I'll Face You"

=== Symbolism ===
- Shield

The shield is blue for Infantry. The wavy fess symbolizes the Aisne River, where the regiment's outstanding achievements took place during World War I; it also symbolizes the Red River separating the States of Texas and Oklahoma, from which states were drawn the units composing the 142d Infantry, Texas Army National Guard – the 7th Texas and Machine Gun Company. The church at St. Etienne, France, was in the sector where the regiment received its baptism of fire. First Lieutenant Donald J. McLennan, D.S.C., scout officer of the 1st Battalion, 142nd Regiment Infantry, led a patrol across the Aisne River into the enemy country on 8 October 1918 and secured information of vast importance to the regiment. As he returned, under heavy fire, to the south bank of the Aisne River with his patrol, he was the last man to cross and would not cross with his back to the enemy. Instead, he backed across the foot-log, shaking his fist and shouting to the enemy "We’re going back, but I’ll face you."

The coat of arms was approved on 27 June 1928.

== Medal of Honor recipients ==
The 142nd Infantry Regiment has had eleven United States Medal of Honor recipients:

- Samuel M. Sampler, Corporal, for actions near St. Etienne, France, 8 October 1918
- Harold Leo Turner, Corporal, for actions near St. Etienne, France, 8 October 1918
- James Marion Logan, Technical Sergeant, for actions near Salerno, Italy, 9 September 1943
- Arnold L. Bjorklund, First Lieutenant, Altavilla, Italy, 13 September 1943
- William J. Crawford, Private, Altavilla, Italy, 13 September 1943
- Homer L. Wise, Staff Sergeant, for actions near Magliano, Italy, 14 June 14, 1944
- Ellis R. Weicht, Sergeant, Saint-Hippolyte, 3 December 1944
- Bernard Pious Bell, Technical Sergeant, for actions near Mittelwihr, France, 18 December 1944
- Emile Deleau Jr., Sergeant, for actions near Oberhoffen, France, 1–2 February 1945
- Edward C. Dahlgren, Sergeant, for actions near Oberhoffen, France, 11 February 1945
- Silvestre S. Herrera, Private First Class, for actions near Mertzwiller, France, 15 March 1945

== See also ==
- Choctaw code talkers
- Distinctive unit insignia (U.S. Army)
