= Arnold L. Bjorklund =

United States Army Medal of Honor recipient (1918–1979)

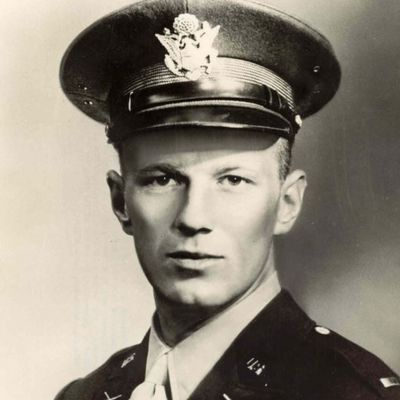
- Born: April 14, 1918; Clinton, Washington
- Died: November 28, 1979 (aged 61); Vancouver, Washington
- Burial place: Willamette National Cemetery, Portland, Oregon
- Military career
- Allegiance: United States of America
- Branch: United States Army
- Rank: First Lieutenant
- Units: 142nd Infantry Regiment, 36th Infantry Division
- Conflicts: World War II
- Awards: Medal of Honor

Arnold L. Bjorklund (April 14, 1918 – November 28, 1979) was a United States Army soldier and a recipient of the United States military's highest decoration—the Medal of Honor—for his actions in World War II.

== Biography ==
Bjorklund joined the Army from Seattle, Washington, in February 1941, and by September 13, 1943, was serving as a first lieutenant in the 142nd Infantry Regiment, 36th Infantry Division. On that day, near Altavilla, Italy, he single-handedly attacked and destroyed two German machine gun emplacements and a mortar position. For these actions, he was awarded the Medal of Honor a year later, on September 6, 1944.

Bjorklund left the Army while still a first lieutenant. He died at age 61 and was buried in Willamette National Cemetery, Portland, Oregon.

== Medal of Honor citation ==
First Lieutenant Bjorklund's official Medal of Honor citation reads:

For conspicuous gallantry and intrepidity at the risk of life above and beyond the call of duty in action with the enemy near Altavilla, Italy, September 13, 1943. When his company attacked a German position on Hill 424, the first platoon, led by 1st Lt. Bjorklund, moved forward on the right flank to the slope of the hill where it was pinned down by a heavy concentration of machinegun and rifle fire. Ordering his men to give covering fire, with only 3 hand grenades, he crept and crawled forward to a German machinegun position located on a terrace along the forward slope. Approaching within a few yards of the position, and while continuously exposed to enemy fire, he hurled 1 grenade into the nest, destroyed the gun and killed 3 Germans. Discovering a second machinegun 20 yards to the right on a higher terrace, he moved under intense enemy fire to a point within a few yards and threw a second grenade into this position, destroying it and killing 2 more Germans. The first platoon was then able to advance 150 yards further up the slope to the crest of the hill, but was again stopped by the fire from a heavy enemy mortar on the reverse slope. 1st Lt. Bjorklund located the mortar and worked his way under little cover to within 10 yards of its position and threw his third grenade, destroying the mortar, killing 2 of the Germans, and forcing the remaining 3 to flee. His actions permitted the platoon to take its objective.

== See also ==
- List of Medal of Honor recipients for World War II
