= Harold L. Turner =

United States Army soldier

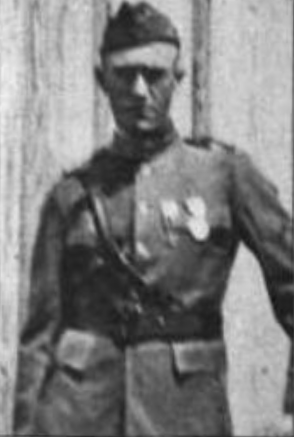
- Born: Harold Leo Turner; May 5, 1898; Aurora, Missouri, US
- Died: March 12, 1938 (aged 39); Caddo Lake, Texas, US
- Military career
- Allegiance: United States
- Branch: United States Army
- Rank: Sergeant
- Service number: 1490302
- Units: Company F, 142nd Infantry, 36th Division
- Conflicts: World War I
- Awards: Medal of Honor

Harold Leo Turner (May 5, 1898 – March 12, 1938) was a United States Army soldier who received the Medal of Honor during World War I.

== Medal of Honor citation ==
Rank and Organization: Corporal, U.S. Army, Company F, 142d Infantry, 36th Division. Place and Date: Near St. Etienne, France, 8 October 1918. Entered Service At: Seminole, Okla. Born: 5 May 1898, Aurora, Mo. G. O. No.: 59, W.D., 1919.

Citation:

After his platoon had started the attack Cpl. Turner assisted in organizing a platoon consisting of the battalion scouts, runners, and a detachment of Signal Corps. As second in command of this platoon he fearlessly led them forward through heavy enemy fire, continually encouraging the men. Later he encountered deadly machinegun fire which reduced the strength of his command to but 4 men, and these were obliged to take shelter. The enemy machinegun emplacement, 25 yards distant, kept up a continual fire from 4 machineguns. After the fire had shifted momentarily, Cpl. Turner rushed forward with fixed bayonet and charged the position alone capturing the strong point with a complement of 50 Germans and 1 machineguns. His remarkable display of courage and fearlessness was instrumental in destroying the strong point, the fire from which had blocked the advance of his company.

== Later life ==
After the war, Turner worked as a banker in Seminole, Oklahoma, and was an American Legion organizer. He drowned while fishing at Caddo Lake near Kilgore, Texas in March 1938.

== See also ==
- List of Medal of Honor recipients
- List of Medal of Honor recipients for World War I
