= Joseph Oklahombi =

Choctaw code talker

- Born: May 1, 1895; Bokchito, Choctaw Nation
- Died: April 13, 1960 (aged 64); Wright City, Oklahoma, U.S.
- Burial place: Yashau Cemetery
- Spouse: Agnes Watkins
- Children: 1
- Military career
- Allegiance: United States
- Branch: United States Army
- Service years: 1917–1918
- Rank: Private First Class
- Units: D Company, 141st Infantry Regiment, 36th Infantry Division
- Conflicts: World War I: Battle of Blanc Mont Ridge
- Awards: Croix de Guerre; Silver Star

Joseph Oklahombi (May 1, 1895 – April 13, 1960) was a Choctaw soldier in the United States Army during the First World War. He was the most-decorated World War I soldier from Oklahoma. One of the Choctaw code talkers, he served in Company D, First Battalion, 141st Regiment, 71st Brigade of the 36th Infantry Division during World War I.

On October 8, 1918, Private Oklahombi was at Saint-Étienne, France. He and 23 other soldiers attacked an enemy position and captured 171 Germans while killing some 79 more. They held their position for four days while under attack. Oklahombi was awarded the Silver Star with Victory Ribbon, and the Croix de Guerre from France's Marshal Henri-Philippe Petain. At the time the members of the Choctaw nation were not formally U.S. citizens.

== Early life ==
Joseph Oklahombi was born on May 1, 1895, in Bokchito, Choctaw Nation, Indian Territory. His parents were Ramsey and Minnie Oklahombi. The last name "Oklahombi" meant "man-killer." He was raised in the mountains, which was considered to be the most beautiful part of the state.

Oklahombi, along with thirteen of the original Choctaw code talkers, attended Armstrong Academy. Armstrong was a state-run boarding school for Indigenous children in the local area which aided in the forced assimilation of Native American children. The boarding school was structured like a military school. Individuals wore uniforms, maintained regulation haircuts, practiced drill instruction, and adhered to organized units. While attending Armstrong, Oklahombi and others were taught how to read and write in English and were prohibited from speaking in their Native tongue.

As he got older, he married a woman named Agnes Watkins and they had one child, Jonah.

== WWI ==
Oklahombi is believed to have enlisted in 1917, serving in the 36th Infantry Divisions A.E.F, Company D, First Battalion, ed. After training, he was sent to Europe in the Spring of 1918. Oklahombi was one of the first ever “Code Talkers”, first being realized by Colonel A.W. Bloor. He and 18 others were the first original Code Talkers, all being Choctaw men. They all belonged to either the 141st, 142nd, or 143rd Infantry Regiment.

Oklahombi is also recognized for his leadership in the Battle of Blanc Mont Ridge. The battle took place near Saint-Etienne-a-Arnes in France, on October 8, 1918. With 23 other soldiers from the same Company, they were able to capture 171 prisoners and killed 79 additional German soldiers. He was able to successfully capture their machine gun after storming 210 yards to it. They were able to hold off the German Army for 4 days after. Oklahombi was awarded the Silver Star with a Victory Ribbon by the U.S., and the French Croix de Guerre for displays of bravery.

== Death ==
On the afternoon of April 13, 1960, Oklahombi was walking from his home just east of Wright City down Broken Bow road. He was reportedly walking along the shoulder of the road against the flow of traffic. Around 3:30 p.m., Kenneth Craig Bazil, a commercial truck driver, struck and killed Oklahombi. Officers on the scene found Oklahombi’s body 70 feet from the accident. He was pronounced dead at the scene having sustained multiple injuries including a broken neck and two broken legs.

Oklahombi’s funeral was held on Friday, April 15, 1960. Having served in the military, and been recognized for his accomplishments, Oklahombi received full military honors. He is buried in the Yashau Cemetery in Wright City Oklahoma.
