= Chardeny =

- Commune
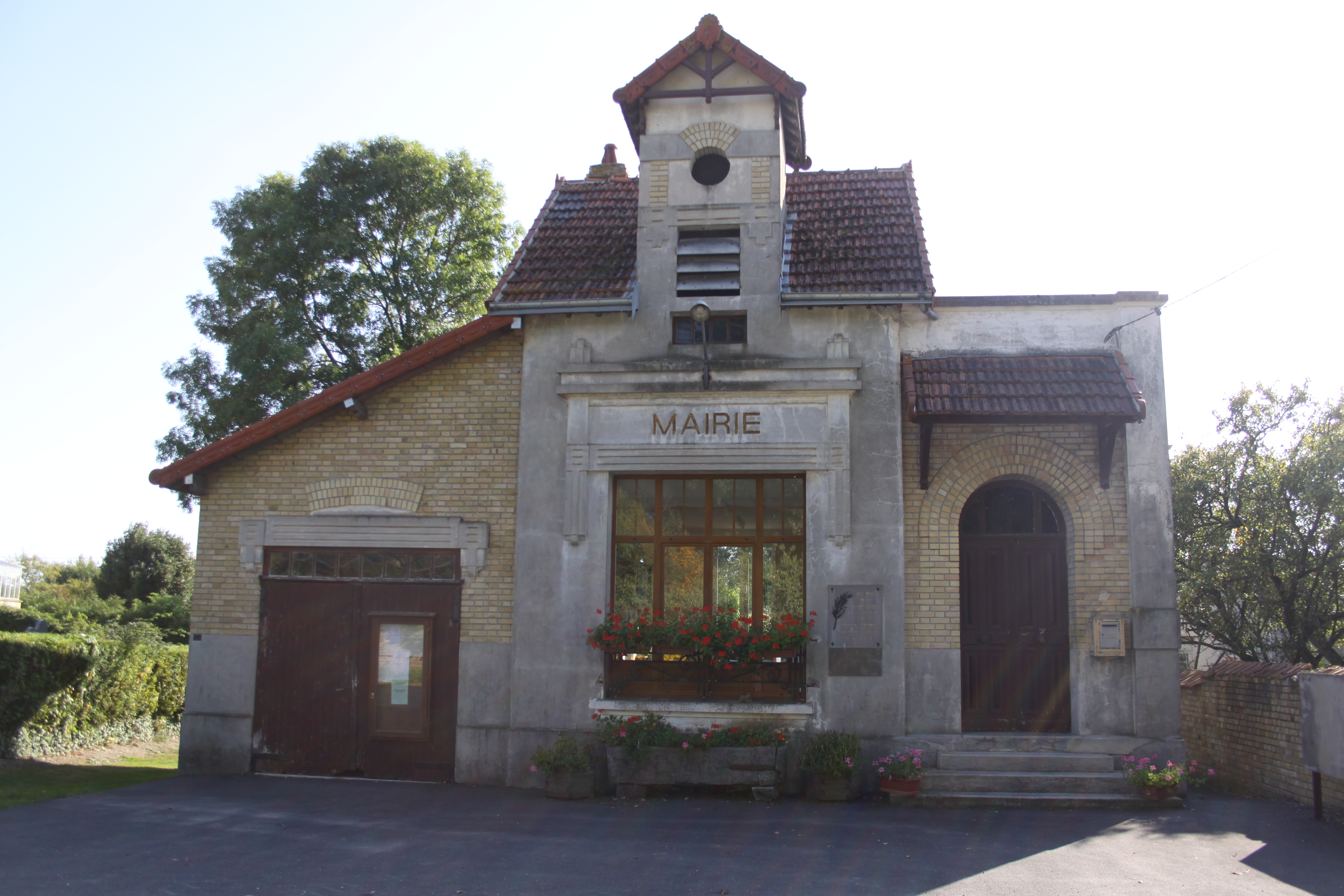
- The town hall in Chardeny
- Location of Chardeny
- Location within France Location within Grand Est
- Coordinates: 49°25′09″N 4°36′05″E
- Country: France
- Region: Grand Est
- Department: Ardennes
- Arrondissement: Vouziers
- Canton: Attigny
- Intercommunality: Argonne Ardennaise

Government
  - Mayor (2020–2026): Pierre Demissy
- Area^{1}: 5.02 km^{2} (1.94 sq mi)
- Highest elevation: 175 m (574 ft)
- Lowest elevation: 101 m (331 ft)
- Population (2023): 55
  - Density: 11/km^{2} (28/sq mi)
- Time zone: UTC+01:00 (CET)
  - Summer (DST): UTC+02:00 (CEST)
- INSEE/Postal code: 08104 /08400
- ^{1} French Land Register data, which excludes lakes, ponds, glaciers > 1 km^{2} (0.386 sq mi or 247 acres) and river estuaries.

Chardeny (French pronunciation: [ʃaʁdəni]) is a commune in the Ardennes department in northern France.

== Population ==
Historical population
Year	Pop.	±% p.a.
1968	40	—
1975	36	−1.49%
1982	38	+0.78%
1990	40	+0.64%
1999	42	+0.54%
2007	39	−0.92%
2012	42	+1.49%
2017	55	+5.54%
2023	55	+0.00%
Source: INSEE

== See also ==
- Communes of the Ardennes department
