= Oberhoffen-sur-Moder =

- Commune
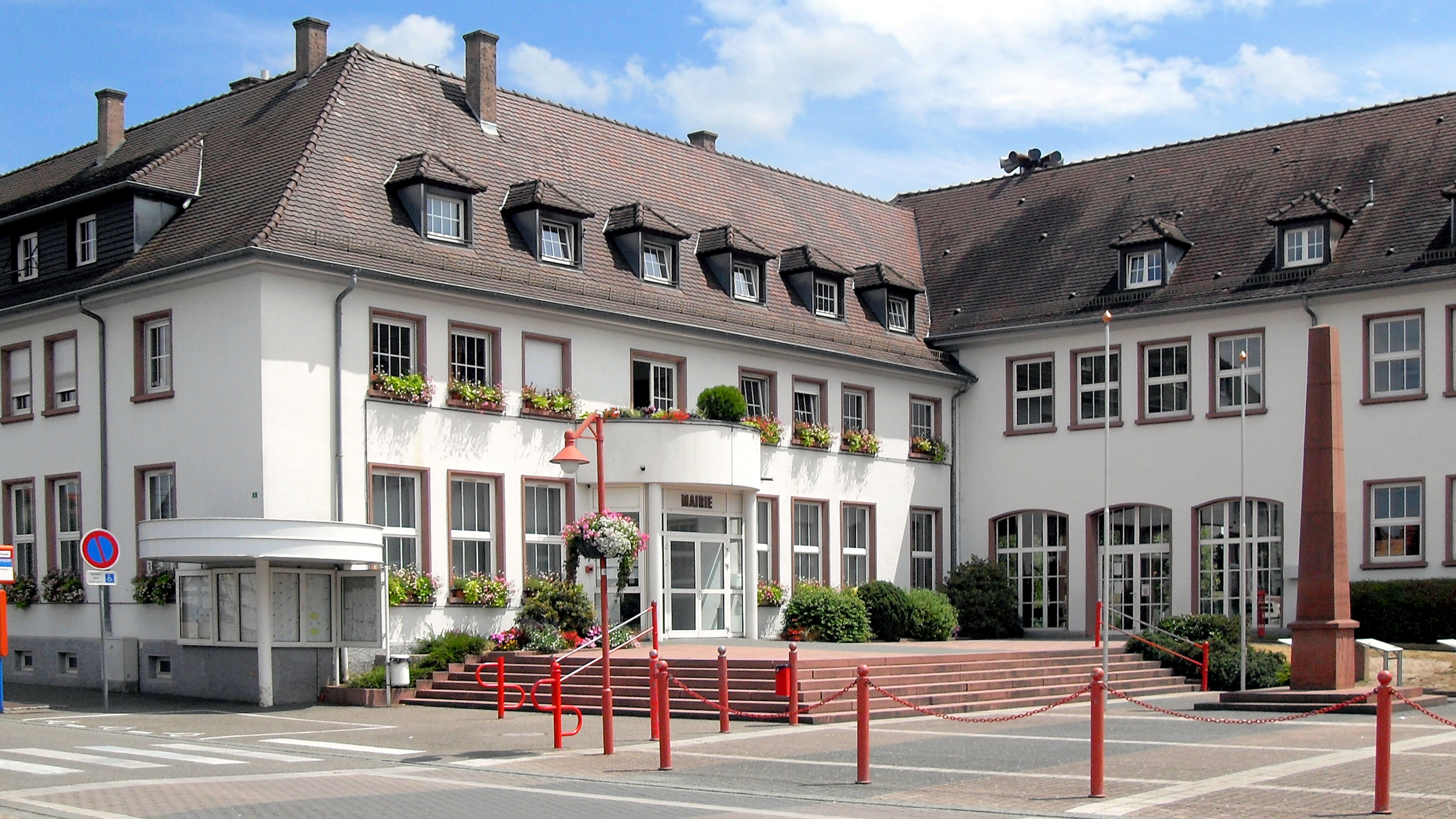
- The town hall in Oberhoffen-sur-Moder

- Coat of arms
- Location of Oberhoffen-sur-Moder
- Location within France Location within Grand Est
- Coordinates: 48°47′05″N 7°51′52″E
- Country: France
- Region: Grand Est
- Department: Bas-Rhin
- Arrondissement: Haguenau-Wissembourg
- Canton: Bischwiller
- Intercommunality: Haguenau

Government
  - Mayor (2020–2026): Cathy Koessler-Herrmann
- Area^{1}: 14.25 km^{2} (5.50 sq mi)
- Highest elevation: 142 m (466 ft)
- Lowest elevation: 121 m (397 ft)
- Population (2023): 3,992
  - Density: 280.1/km^{2} (725.6/sq mi)
- Time zone: UTC+01:00 (CET)
  - Summer (DST): UTC+02:00 (CEST)
- INSEE/Postal code: 67345 /67240
- ^{1} French Land Register data, which excludes lakes, ponds, glaciers > 1 km^{2} (0.386 sq mi or 247 acres) and river estuaries.

Oberhoffen-sur-Moder (French pronunciation: [obɛʁofɛn syʁ modɛʁ]; German: Oberhofen an der Moder) is a commune in the Bas-Rhin department in Grand Est in north-eastern France. Until 1927 the commune’s name was Oberhoffen, "sur-Moder" was added to distinguish it from Oberhoffen-lès-Wissembourg, also located in the department of Bas-Rhin.

== History ==
The first mention of Oberhoffen is found in a document written by Emperor Philip of Swabia in 1207. At that time Oberhoffen was in the Holy Roman Empire.

When the Thirty Years' War began in 1618, Oberhoffen was in the Grafschaft of Hanau-Lichtenberg, part of the Holy Roman Empire, ruled by the Count of Hanau and Lord of Lichtenberg a German nobleman. The Lords of Lichtenberg had been the rulers of Oberhoffen since the 13th century. In 1488 with the death of the last Lord Lichtenberg his territory was divided between his two sons-in-law, the Count of Hanau who then took the title of Hanau-Lichtenberg and the Count Zweibrücken-Bitsch. Oberhoffen was in the territory transferred to Simon Wecker IV, Count of Zweibrücken-Bitsch. When that line died out in 1570 the portion of the territory containing Oberhoffen was transferred to the Count of Hanau-Lichtenberg. It was also in that year that Oberhoffen became Lutheran, the religion of its ruler.

Oberhoffen did not escape the devastation of the Thirty Years' War. The war finally ended in 1648 with the signing of the Peace of Westphalia. This treaty left the political situation in Alsace ambiguous. In that treaty the Holy Roman Emperor renounced his rights to Alsace, however the German nobles there were to suffer no harm to their rights and freedoms, were to retain their imperial status, and were to remain subject to the Imperial Court, but without prejudice to the French sovereignty rights. In the years that followed King Louis XIV would consolidate his control over Alsace.

After the Franco-Dutch War, King Louis XIV decided to pursue "legal means" to resolve the ambiguity in the sovereignty over the lands in Alsace and other areas by setting up special French courts or chambers to consider his territorial claims. The Conseil souverain d'Alsace ruled that the Alsatian lands of the Counts of Hanau-Lichtenberg were under the sovereignty of the French king. The Count of Hanau-Lichtenberg respected this verdict and in 1680 took an oath of allegiance to the French king. On 3 October 1680 the Count of Hanau-Lichtenberg changed the book of church order and ordered his subjects to no longer pray for the Emperor of the Holy Roman Empire, but for His Majesty the King of France and Navarre.

The Counts of Hanau-Lichtenberg, under French supremacy, continued to rule the area of Alsace that included Oberhoffen until 1736 when Johann Reinhard III (1665–1736) the last Count of Hanau-Lichtenberg died. His only child who survived to adulthood, Countess Charlotte Christine Magdalene Johanna of Hanau-Lichtenberg (1700–1726), married Louis VIII, Landgrave of Hesse-Darmstadt. With the consent of the French king, their son the future ruling Landgrave Louis IX (1719–1790), who became the ruling landgrave of Hesse-Darmstadt in 1768, inherited that part of Hanau-Lichtenberg where Oberhoffen was located on the death of his grandfather.

Before 1789, the people of the Hanauer lands in Alsace remained German in outlook, customs, language, and dress. Relations with the German Empire were more numerous than with the French government. This began to change with the French Revolution. On 11 Aug 1789 the French abolished all rights of the nobility in Alsace including those of the Landgrave of Hesse-Darmstadt the ruler of Oberhoffen. By 1790 Oberhoffen had been placed in the Canton of Bischwiller in the department of Bas-Rhin, France, the jurisdiction it is in today.

19th Century

Four factors influenced Oberhoffen during the 19th century: an increase in population, the creation of the communal lot distribution system (Burtel), an increase in emigration to United States, and the aftermath of the Franco-Prussian War of 1870–71.

== Population ==
Historical population
Year	Pop.	±% p.a.
1968	2,349	—
1975	2,459	+0.66%
1982	2,711	+1.40%
1990	2,930	+0.98%
1999	2,944	+0.05%
2007	3,123	+0.74%
2012	3,390	+1.65%
2017	3,486	+0.56%
2023	3,992	+2.28%
Source: INSEE

== Notable people ==
- Sébastien Loeb, French rally and racing driver
- Charles Miller, born Oberhoffen-sur-Moder, June 15, 1843, commander the organization now known as the 28th Infantry Division and founder of the Galena-Signal Oil Company, which became part of the Standard Oil combine, and then part of the corporation now known as Texaco.

== See also ==
- Communes of the Bas-Rhin department
