= Saint-Étienne-à-Arnes =

- Commune
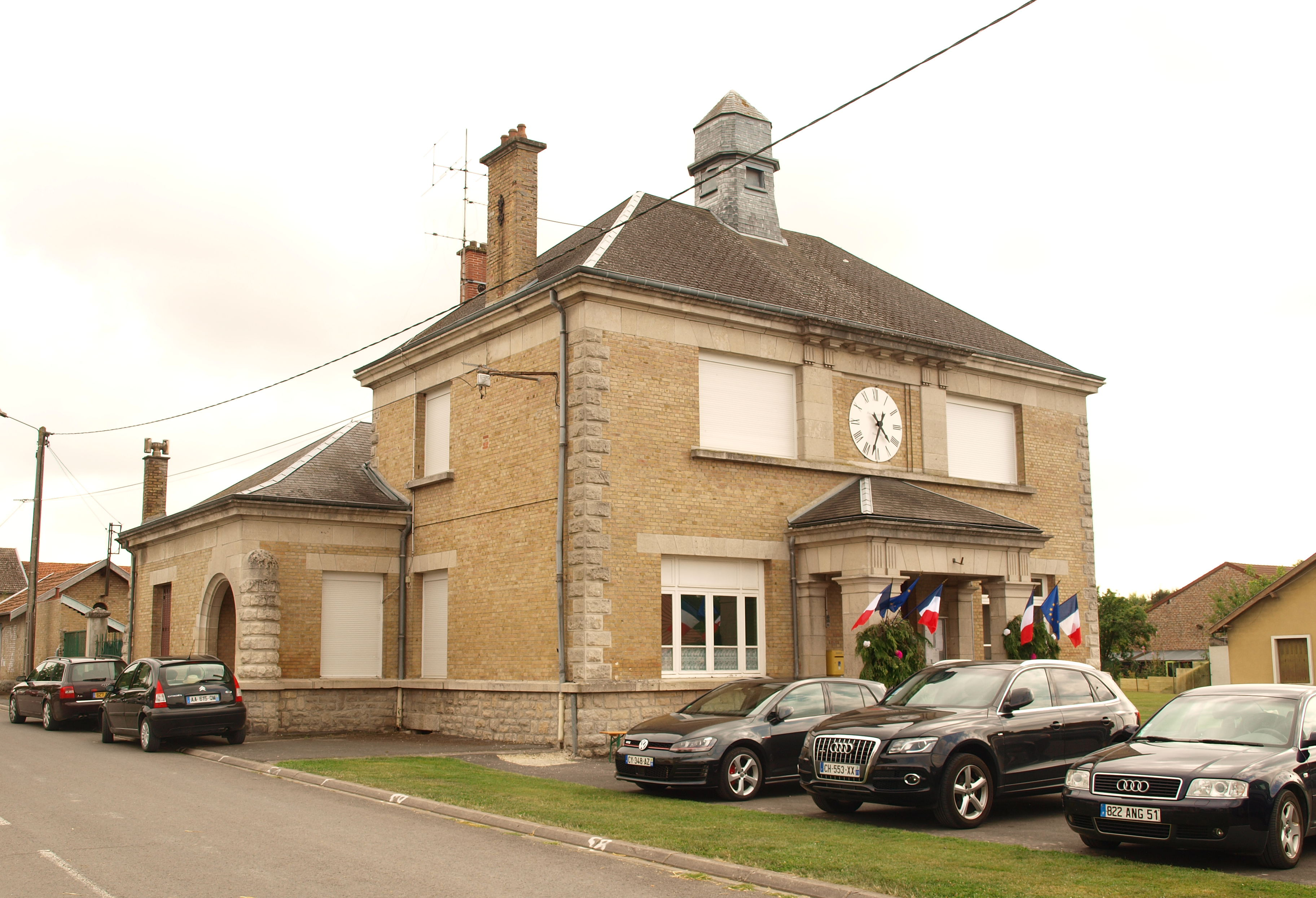
- The town hall in Saint-Étienne-à-Arnes

- Coat of arms
- Location of Saint-Étienne-à-Arnes
- Location within France Location within Grand Est
- Coordinates: 49°18′39″N 4°29′39″E
- Country: France
- Region: Grand Est
- Department: Ardennes
- Arrondissement: Vouziers
- Canton: Attigny
- Intercommunality: Argonne Ardennaise

Government
  - Mayor (2020–2026): Elise Roussy
- Area^{1}: 29.56 km^{2} (11.41 sq mi)
- Elevation: 115 m (377 ft)
- Highest elevation: 208 m (682 ft)
- Lowest elevation: 114 m (374 ft)
- Population (2023): 245
  - Density: 8.29/km^{2} (21.5/sq mi)
- Time zone: UTC+01:00 (CET)
  - Summer (DST): UTC+02:00 (CEST)
- INSEE/Postal code: 08379 /08310
- ^{1} French Land Register data, which excludes lakes, ponds, glaciers > 1 km^{2} (0.386 sq mi or 247 acres) and river estuaries.

Saint-Étienne-à-Arnes is a commune in the Ardennes department and Grand Est region of north-eastern France.

== Population ==
Historical population
Year	Pop.	±% p.a.
1968	237	—
1975	227	−0.61%
1982	202	−1.65%
1990	198	−0.25%
1999	166	−1.94%
2007	203	+2.55%
2012	242	+3.58%
2017	242	+0.00%
2023	245	+0.21%
Source: INSEE

== See also ==
- Communes of the Ardennes department
