= List of place names of Choctaw origin =

This is a list of place names that have arisen from or have equivalents in the Choctaw language or are from the names of people who were themselves Choctaw.

== Language derivations ==
- Louisiana, United States
  - Atchafalaya River and Atchafalaya Swamp
  - Bogalusa
  - Bogue Falaya
- Oklahoma, United States
  - Bokchito
  - Bokoshe
  - Chahtah Tamaha

== Personal name derivations ==
- Oklahoma, United States
  - Apukshunnubbee District
  - Atoka and Atoka County
  - Beavers Bend Resort Park

== Equivalents without origin information ==
- Oklahoma, United States
  - Buck Creek, known in Choctaw as Lapitta Bok

== Unverified ==
- Chatawa, Mississippi
- Chickasha, Oklahoma
- Choctaw County, Oklahoma
- Choctaw, Oklahoma
- Eagletown, Oklahoma
- Hochatown, Oklahoma
- Honobia, Oklahoma
- Johns Valley, Oklahoma
- Kosoma, Oklahoma
- Moshulatubbee District
- Nashoba, Oklahoma
- Noxubee County, Mississippi
- Okaloosa County, Florida
- Oklahoma
- Oklahoma City
- Oklahoma County, Oklahoma
- Olney, Oklahoma
- Panola, Oklahoma
- Pocola, Oklahoma
- Ponchatoula, Louisiana
- Pushmataha County, Oklahoma
- Pushmataha District
- Red Oak, Oklahoma
- Skullyville, Oklahoma
- Smithville, Oklahoma
- Talihina, Oklahoma
- Tamaha, Oklahoma
- Tullahoma, Tennessee
- Tushka, Oklahoma
- Tuskahoma, Oklahoma
