= Johns Valley, Oklahoma =

Valley in Oklahoma, United States

Coordinates: 34°27′54″N 95°36′49″W

Johns Valley is a geographic feature and place name located in the Kiamichi Mountains in northwestern Pushmataha County, Oklahoma. The valley is formally classified by geologists as a "basin" due to its complete encirclement by mountains.

== Location ==
The valley is approximately 22 miles north of Antlers, Oklahoma. Using the Public Land Survey System commonly in use in Oklahoma it is located in Section 5, Township 1 South, Range 16 East. Its latitude is N34.46510 and longitude is W95.61359.

== History ==
The first settler in Johns Valley was American Civil War veteran Henry Amos Johns. Johns, a Choctaw Indian who had fought in a Choctaw Indian battalion in the Confederate States Army, moved to the valley after the war, establishing a church there in 1865.

At the time the valley was part of Jack's Fork County of the Choctaw Nation, in the Indian Territory. Johns arrived there from San Bois County in the Choctaw Nation, which was north and east of present-day McAlester, Oklahoma. Jack's Fork County was a geographic behemoth—it was bounded by the Kiamichi River on the east and Muddy Boggy River on the west, Beaver Creek (south of present-day Antlers, Oklahoma) on its south, and the mountains north of present-day Sardis Lake on its north.

Johns named the valley Big Caney Valley, due to the thick stands of cane he found there. Later white settlers called it Johns Valley, in deference to Amos Johns.

Johns and later Choctaw Indian settlers drove oxen teams to Fort Smith, Arkansas, to purchase groceries and other goods. The trip usually took one month. After the St. Louis and San Francisco Railroad opened through the Kiamichi River valley in 1887 they traded at what are now the communities of Tuskahoma, Oklahoma, and Kosoma, Oklahoma.

The church founded by Johns was Presbyterian and came to be called Big Caney Presbyterian Church. It was the only church in the valley. Johns built it out of logs, and split logs formed its pews.

A school was also established for Johns Valley, and it met in the church. After statehood the valley was settled by white people, who built a new school of lumber. The school appears to have been intermittent, starting and stopping occasionally. It reopened again for the last time during the 1930s or 1940s, but has been closed for decades.

Logging and cattle ranching were the valley's first and only major industries. Timber companies logged the valley for its valuable hardwood and pine trees. After logging ceased the valley became home to the immense Basket Ranch, operated by the Basket family. Several other families lived in the valley and worked for the Baskets, some on a full-time basis, and some periodically. Notable among these were the Rember and Pettijohn families. Regardless of family affiliation, all residents of the valley worked together for mutual benefit when a large labor force was needed such as when baling hay or rounding up cattle. When the Basket Family sold their property and moved from the valley, most of the other families followed. Johns Valley has had no permanent residents since the mid-1950s.

At the time of white settlement, Johns Valley was home to an array of wildlife, much of which disappeared after the whites’ arrival due to their propensity to hunt. Early-day Choctaw settlers coexisted—sometimes peaceably and sometimes not—with a fairly large bear population, and a great many panthers. The bears troubled settlers to the extent they would kill livestock, but were not considered rapacious. Panthers, however, occasionally became so troublesome that panther hunts were organized.

Rattlesnakes—an even less welcome form of wildlife—were everywhere. Amos Johns’ granddaughter, interviewed in the 1930s, recalled knowing at least four people killed by rattlesnakes. “It was very dangerous for anyone to step out at night”, she said, as “the valley was filled with big rattlers. You could see them at any time during the day.” By the time of her interview she believed the rattlesnakes to be far fewer in number than previously, and credited the valley's later white settlers with eradicating them.

A United States Post Office was established in Johns Valley and operated from September 28, 1912 to May 15, 1915. It was called Johns, Oklahoma. Despite its formal designation by the post office—which failed to include "Valley" in the formal name—the area has always been known as Johns Valley.

Johns Valley was and continues to be very isolated, with only one road of any note entering or leaving it. This road is not much better today than it was in 1927, when a team of geologists entered the valley to study its massive boulders. “The road into Johns Valley is not a good automobile road. In fact, it is one of the worst automobile roads imaginable,” the chief geologist wrote.

Difficulties of another sort—with international repercussions—were experienced during World War II, when the Moyers and Johns Valley areas were the site of two lethal air crashes. British pilots operating from a Royal Air Force base in Texas crashed into White Rock Mountain and Big Mountain, killing four crewmen.

Big Mountain is generally accepted as the southern geographical limit of Johns Valley.

Two planes were destroyed. A third plane crash-landed successfully at Jumbo. On February 20, 2000, the AT6 Monument was dedicated in the fliers' honor at the crash site on Big Mountain. Over 1,000 people attended the ceremony, and the story was carried by the British Broadcasting Corporation and many newspapers around the world.

More information on Johns Valley and the surrounding Kiamichi Mountains may be found in the Pushmataha County Historical Society.

== Geology ==
Johns Valley is an oval-shaped basin, 4 miles (6.4 km) long and 3 miles (4.8 km) wide.

The valley is geographically isolated by formidable mountains. To its east are the lofty Pine Creek (1,460 ft.), Wildhorse (1,260 ft.) and Bull Creek (1,060 ft.) mountains. To its west is Buck Creek Mountain (1,184 ft.). Its northern limit is generally defined as Big Caney Mountain (1,467 ft.), and its southern limit as Big Mountain (1,145 ft.).

The distant geological past is immediately present in Johns Valley. A formation of massive boulders littering the tops of mountains, called Rock Town, is thought to be the “largest transported masses of rock on the North American continent”, according to one geological study. These boulders contain fossils identifying them as dating from the Ordovician age—very much older than the Caney shale formations on top of which they presently sit.

The boulders range in size from small pebbles the size of marbles up to and including great masses of limestone, the largest of which measures 370 ft. long, 65 ft. wide and 20 ft. thick. Several measure over one hundred feet in length. The largest weigh over 50,000 tons.

Although the boulders by themselves are of great interest, the story of how they came to rest there formed a mystery which geologists spent decades unraveling.

During prehistoric times Johns Valley was on the floor of an ocean. The nearby—and no longer extant—Wichita-Criner Mountains, Red River Mountains and Amarillo Mountains (now buried) lay to the southwest. They are thought to have towered several thousand feet above sea level. Geologists believe that during an ancient glacial era ocean currents carried icebergs or glaciers containing these boulders northeast from these mountain ranges, dropping the massive boulders to sink to the ocean floor.

Additional groupings of transported boulders in the Johns Valley region are known as the McKinley Rocks. These are located across the Kiamichi River valley, atop the mountains south of Tuskahoma, Oklahoma, and east of Clayton, Oklahoma. The only larger known formation of transported rocks in the world is found in Sweden.
