= Kosoma, Oklahoma =

Ghost Town in Oklahoma, United States

Coordinates: 34°20′54″N 95°36′47″W

Kosoma is a ghost town and former railroad station in Pushmataha County, Oklahoma, United States. It is located just off Oklahoma State Highway 2, approximately 10 miles (16 km) north of Antlers.

== Geography ==
Kosoma is located in a rugged but scenic area. It is adjacent to the Kiamichi River at the base of Big Mountain, also known as Deer Mountain. Close by is Lost Mountain, notable for its relative cone shape and location in the middle of the Kiamichi River valley, apart from other mountains. The area of the valley floor on which Kosoma was built is bracketed by two locally prominent and well-watered streams: Buck Creek to the south and Pine Creek to the north.

== History ==
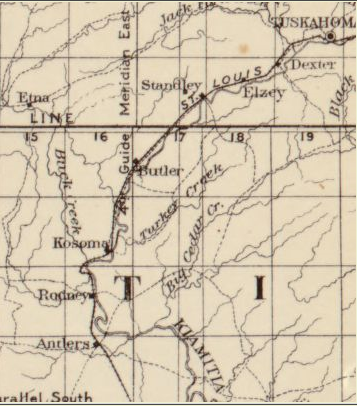
Map showing Kosoma, Indian Territory, c. 1898--the height of its success.

A permanent settlement has existed at the site of modern Kosoma since at least the 1880s. During the 1880s, the St. Louis-San Francisco Railway, more popularly known as the “Frisco”, built a line from north to south through the Choctaw Nation, connecting Fort Smith, Arkansas with Paris, Texas. The railroad paralleled the Kiamichi River throughout much of its route in present-day Pushmataha County. Train stations were established every few miles to aid in opening up the land and, more particularly, to serve as the locations of section houses. Supervisors for their respective miles of track lived in the section houses to administer the track and its right-of-way. These stations also served as points at which the trains could draw water.

The site of the future Kosoma was selected because of its proximity to the Kiamichi River, with its abundant water supply. Adjacent station stops were established at Wadena, four miles to the north, and Moyers, three miles to the south.

The name Kosoma, which means "place of the stinking water" in the Choctaw language, derives its name from prominent sulphur springs located nearby.

The sparsely populated area, at that time known as Jack’s Fork County, a part of the Pushmataha District of the Choctaw Nation, in the Indian Territory, was home to Choctaw Indians who farmed or subsisted on the land. Few roads or trails existed, but with the railroad came white settlers, seeking commercial opportunities.

Kosoma became an immediate boomtown, home to a thriving timber industry. Sawmills were established in the mountains surrounding the town and the mills used Kosoma’s railroad depot as a transshipment point. At its height Kosoma had numerous commercial establishments, including stores, saloons, and doctor’s offices, as well as at least one dance hall.

Transportation was provided by the Frisco Railroad, which offered six trains per day—three in each direction—until it closed to passenger traffic during the late 1950s. It continued freight operations until 1981, when it closed altogether and its rails were removed.

The loss of passenger rail coincided with the construction of Oklahoma State Highway 2. It offered a paved, graded route all the way from Antlers to two miles north of Moyers, at the turn-off to Baugh’s Prairie and Big Mountain. (It was later completed in the 1980s.) North of Kosoma the highway remained unpaved and somewhat primitive until completion in the 1980s, crossing Pine Creek via a low-water bridge and climbing the flank of Bull Run Mountain.

Until the advent of State Highway 2, overland transportation was problematic at best—particularly due to the need to ford Buck Creek, which occupies a steep valley from its headwaters in the Kiamichi Mountains all the way to its confluence with the Kiamichi River.

A United States Post Office was established at Kosoma, Indian Territory on November 28, 1888, a testament to its early vitality so soon after the railroad opened. With the logging of forests in the region, Kosoma went into a steep decline during the early 1900s (decade), culminating in the loss of its post office in 1954.

At this writing, Kosoma is a ghost town with only two or three buildings still standing. These are found just off the short “Kosoma Loop” off State Highway 2 and have been subject to vandalism. currently owned by Jerry Baker, The de facto Mayor of the Ghost town.

During World War II, the Kosoma area was the site of two lethal air crashes. British pilots operating from a Royal Air Force base in Texas, hampered by poor weather, crashed into White Rock Mountain and Big Mountain, killing four crewmen. Two planes were destroyed, while a third plane crash-landed successfully a few miles northwest at Jumbo. On February 20, 2000, the AT6 Monument was dedicated in the fliers' honor at the crash site on Big Mountain, just southeast of Kosoma. Over 1,000 people attended the ceremony, and the story was carried by the British Broadcasting Corporation and many newspapers around the world.

More information on Kosoma and the Kiamichi River valley may be found in the Pushmataha County Historical Society.

== See also ==
- List of ghost towns in Oklahoma
