= Big Mountain (Oklahoma) =

Mountain in Oklahoma, United States

- Deer Mountain
- Location within Oklahoma

Highest point
- Elevation: 1,145 ft (349 m)
- Coordinates: 34°24′55″N 95°36′52″W

Naming
- Native name: Nʋnih Chito Issi (Choctaw)

Geography
- Location: Pushmataha County, Oklahoma, United States
- Parent range: Kiamichi Mountains

Big Mountain is a mountain in Pushmataha County, Oklahoma. It is part of the Kiamichi Mountains, a subrange of the Ouachita Mountains.

== Geology ==
The summit of Big Mountain is 1,145 feet above sea level. It is located 5.5 miles northeast of Moyers, Oklahoma. Buck Creek forms its southern limit. Pine Creek forms its northern limit. The Kiamichi River forms its eastern limit, and Kimbrough Creek forms its western limit. The mountain is considered to form the southern geographic limit of Johns Valley.

== History ==
Big Mountain has also in the past been called Deer Mountain.

During World War II the area was the site of two lethal air crashes. British pilots operating from a Royal Air Force base in Texas crashed into White Rock Mountain and Big Mountain, killing four crew men. Two planes were destroyed. On February 20, 2000 the AT6 Monument was dedicated in the fliers' honor at the crash site on Big Mountain. Over 1,000 people attended the ceremony, and the story was carried by the British Broadcasting Corporation and many newspapers around the world.

== Development ==
Big Mountain is the entry point for a vast acreage known locally as the Kiamichi Wilderness. The Wilderness was subdivided during the 1970s and 1980s as a land development scheme. It remains highly rural and isolated. There are relatively few homes; most dwellings are cabins. Phase One of the Kiamichi Wilderness, closer to the front of the mountain, contains passable roads. Electric and telephone service extend partway into the area. Phases Two and Three, each ranging successively to the west, are progressively isolated, and Phase Three is reachable only during dry weather, when creeks may be forded.

Many of the landowners are from the Dallas, Texas area and visit on weekends. They are known locally as “weekend warriors”. The residents of Big Mountain, although living in scattered isolation, have developed a cohesive social network which has spawned regular gatherings and support ranging from Friday night rattlesnake fries to a volunteer fire department.

The only entry to the area is via the road from the Kiamichi River valley. During the Kiamichi Wilderness's early years this was controlled by a guard shack. During recent years, the entrance is monitored 24/7 by cameras and is patrolled frequently by a security officer. Land Owners and their guests are the only ones allowed on the mountain. The AT6 Monument is a short way into Phase One from the guard shack, with good roads and a directional sign allowing for easy access.
