= Pyrobitumen =

Type of solid, amorphous organic matter

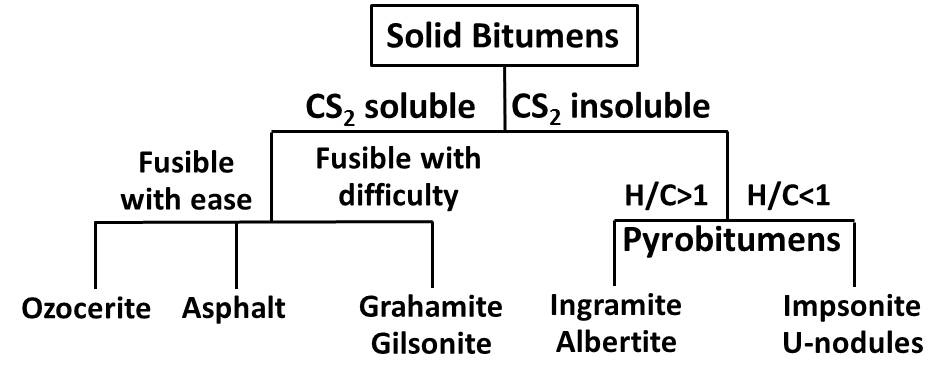
- Classification System for Bitumens as Adapted from Abraham and Curiale

General
- Category: Organic matter
- Colour: Variable

Pyrobitumen is a type of solid, amorphous organic matter. Pyrobitumen is mostly insoluble in carbon disulfide and other organic solvents as a result of molecular cross-linking, which renders previously soluble organic matter (i.e., bitumen) insoluble. Not all solid bitumens are pyrobitumens, in that some solid bitumens (e.g., gilsonite) are soluble in common organic solvents, including CS_{2}, dichloromethane, and benzene-methanol mixtures.

== Other related hydrocarbons ==
While the primary distinction between bitumen and pyrobitumen is solubility, the thermal processes driving the molecular cross-linking also decrease the atomic ratio of hydrogen to carbon from greater than one to less than one and ultimately to approximately one half. It should also be understood that both solubility and atomic H/C ratios form a continuum, and most solid bitumens have both soluble and insoluble components. The distinction between pyrobitumen and residual kerogen in a mature source rock is based on microscopic evidence of fluid flow within the rock fabric and is usually not determined.

The terms bitumen and pyrobitumen have related definitions in the Earth's crust and in the laboratory. In geology, bitumen is the product of deposition and maturation of organic matter. The extractable organic material (EOM) in petroleum source rocks and reservoir rocks is defined as bitumen. Upon exposure to high regional temperatures over geological time, bitumen is converted to pyrobitumen as a result of the thermally activated reactions that drive off lighter oil and gas products and leave an insoluble, carbon-rich residue. Pyrobitumen represents a significant fraction of the ultimate fate of petroleum liquids formed from kerogen during catagenesis. In the laboratory, experiments on organic-rich rocks (oil shales and petroleum source rocks), decomposition of the initially insoluble organic matter (defined as kerogen) produces gaseous and liquid products. The soluble fluid that remains in the heated rock is defined as bitumen. Upon further thermal exposure, the bitumen continues to evolve and disproportionates into pyrobitumen and more oil and gas.

The terms bitumen and asphalt are often used interchangeably to describe highly viscous to solid forms of petroleum that have been used in construction since the fifth millennium B.C. Bitumen is distinct from tar, which properly describes a product formed by pyrolysis (destructive distillation) of coal or wood. Pitch recovered from petroleum by distillation is also sometimes called bitumen or asphalt.

== Etymology ==
The expression "bitumen" originated in the Sanskrit, where we find the words jatu, meaning "pitch," and jatu-krit, meaning "pitch creating", "pitch producing" (referring to coniferous or resinous trees). The Latin equivalent is claimed by some to be originally gwitu-men (pertaining to pitch), and by others, pixtumens (exuding or bubbling pitch), which was subsequently shortened to bitumen.

== Definition ==
Hunt defines bitumen as a native substance of variable color, viscosity, and volatility composed primarily of carbon and hydrogen. He further defines petroleum as a form of bitumen that is gaseous or liquid in the reservoir and can be produced through a pipe. Other bitumens range from very viscous (e.g., Athabasca and Venezuelan heavy oils, La Brea Tar Pits) to solid (e.g. gilsonite, ozocerite, grahamite, impsonite). Pyrobitumen is formed by thermal decomposition and molecular cross-linking of bitumen. Pyrobitumen is distinguished from other solid bitumens extruded from early-mature kerogen-rich source rocks (e.g., gilsonite) and semi-solid bitumens in high viscosity oil sands formed by water washing and biodegradation of conventional oil (e.g., Athabasca bituminous sands), all of which are soluble in carbon disulfide.

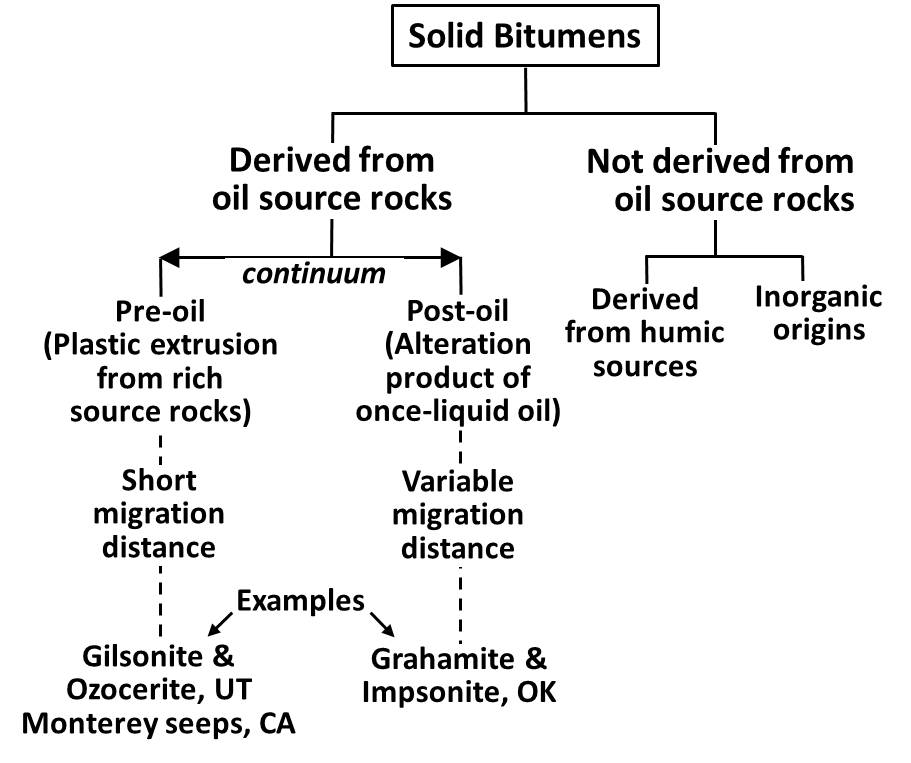
Figure 2. Classification System for Solid Bitumens Adapted from Curiale using modern organic geochemical techniques.

== Classification ==
Archaic classification systems for classifying bitumens were constructed without the extensive knowledge of organic geochemistry developed over the past 50 years. Pyrobitumen was originally defined as a solid bitumen that is insoluble and infusible. The original classification system for solid bitumen of Abraham, as adapted from Curiale, is shown in Figure 1. Curiale says that while the historical classification scheme is useful for sorting museum collections, it is not useful for establishing genetic relationships, and he proposed the alternative classification shown in Figure 2.

Although there is not a direct relationship between the classification systems in Figures 1 and 2, one kind of pyrobitumen is a subset of the post-oil solid bitumen formed by thermal degradation of kerogen and oil. Of the 27 samples investigated by Curiale, the three impsonite samples had low solubility (<3%) and a low H/C ratio (<0.9) characteristic of highly mature organic matter. These samples also had the lowest asphaltene, highest aromatic, and highest volatile content in the soluble fraction. Carbon deposits associated with uranium nodules also had low solubilities and H/C ratios less than 1.0 and correspond to pyrobitumens with inorganic origins. For comparison, coal tar pitch has an atomic H/C ratio of about 0.8.

In the petroleum geochemistry community, pyrobitumen is the remains of thermally altered oil that was previously generated during kerogen maturation—much of that oil migrated to and accumulated in an oil reservoir. Petrographic studies of residues of hydrous pyrolysis, which is considered to be a good laboratory simulation of natural petroleum formation, show the formation of a continuous bituminous network during the early stages of kerogen transformation, some of which is converted to pyrobitumen at high thermal exposure. This definition is consistent with that given for pyrobitumen in the Society of Petroleum Engineers Glossary: “a hard, native asphalt within the [rock] pores. Does not ordinarily move or enter into the reaction.” Hunt uses this definition of thermally mature residue to calculate material balances for the fate of oil at very high maturities, both that retained in the source rock and that from reservoirs. Pyrobitumen in thermally mature oil reservoirs has been characterized by Hwang. More recently, the pyrobitumen retained in the source rock is considered to play an important role in the storage and production of shale gas.

In oil shale retorting, pyrobitumen residue has an atomic H/C ratio of about 0.5 and is often called coke, which has its analog in the production of petroleum and coal cokes by destructive distillation, although some workers, e.g., Wen and Kobylinski, have inappropriately used the term pyrobitumen as the reaction intermediate between kerogen and oil to distinguish it from natural bitumen.

Some archaic definitions of pyrobitumen include peat and lignite, although these materials experienced little geological heating compared to that required to form fluid bitumen, let alone pyrobitumen. For humic-derived solids in the earth, an analogous position on the coal maturation pathway would place it at a minimum in the medium-volatile bituminous range (i.e., H/C<0.8, O/C<0.05, and vitrinite reflectance >1.0%)., For petroleum systems, Mukhopadhyay states that solid bitumen starts to form when vitrinite reflectance reaches 0.45%, i.e., the early stages of conversion of kerogen to oil and gas. Bitumen also becomes more reflective with maturity, and he gives an equivalent bitumen reflectance of 0.6% for a vitrinite reflectance of 1.0%, which corresponds to the boundary between asphalt/albertite and epi-impsonite. Although the archaic definition of pyrobitumen includes low-maturity solid bitumens such as albertite, a definition more closely linked to the formation and destruction of oil from kerogen would define pyrobitumen as having an H/C ratio less than 1.0. In fact, the Biomarker Guide defines pyrobitumen as having an H/C ratio less than 0.5, which corresponds to vitrinite reflectance of about 2.0% and low-volatile bituminous to semi-anthracite coal rank. Hwang et al. found that the solubility of solid reservoir bitumens decreased below 50% for a vitrinite reflectance of 0.7% and below 20% for vitrinite reflectance greater than 1.0%, with a vitrinite reflectance of 1.1% corresponding to an atomic H/C ratio of 0.8. Warner et al. also found pyrobitumen in the Tengiz field with H/C of 0.8. They also quote it as having high reflectivity, including the occurrence of mosaic reflectivity texture. Pyrolysis yielded some oil similar to that from which it was derived. Bordenave describes pyrobitumen as having a reflectivity of between 1.5 and 2.5% and a pyrolysis yield of less than 80 mg hydrocarbon/g organic carbon. From these descriptions and other pyrolysis studies, it becomes clear that the H/C ratio of 0.5 given by Peters corresponds to the end of such pyrolysis yield, even though the bitumen becomes insoluble, and therefore pyrobitumen, prior to that maturity.
