= Kellond, Oklahoma =

Unincorporated community in Oklahoma, US

Coordinates: 34°15′49″N 95°38′25″W

Kellond is an unincorporated community and former railroad station in Pushmataha County, Oklahoma, United States. Kellond is located approximately three miles northwest of Antlers on Oklahoma State Highway 2.

== History ==
During the 1880s the St. Louis-San Francisco Railway, more popularly known as the “Frisco”, built a line from north to south through the Choctaw Nation, connecting Fort Smith, Arkansas with Paris, Texas. The railroad paralleled the Kiamichi River throughout much of its route in present-day Pushmataha County, Oklahoma. Train stations were established every few miles to aid in opening up the land and, more particularly, to serve as the locations of section houses. Supervisors for their respective miles of track lived in the section houses to administer the track and its right-of-way. These stations also served as points at which the trains could draw water.

The sparsely populated area, at that time known as Jack’s Fork County, a part of the Pushmataha District of the Choctaw Nation, in the Indian Territory, was home to Choctaw Indians who farmed or subsisted on the land.

Few roads or trails existed. Transportation was provided by the Frisco Railroad, which offered six trains per day—three in each direction—until it closed to passenger traffic during the late 1950s. It continued freight operations until 1981, when it closed altogether and its rails were removed. The loss of passenger rail coincided with the construction of Oklahoma State Highway 2.

Near Kellond was a locally important low-water ford on the Kiamichi River known as Rodney Crossing. The crossing obtained its name from Rodney Mountain, located to the north of the settlement. It was also home to the short-lived post office and small community of Rodney, Oklahoma.
