= Lost Mountain =

Mountain in Oklahoma, United States of America

- Location within Oklahoma

Highest point
- Elevation: 791 ft (241 m)
- Coordinates: 34°22′38″N 95°35′40″W

Geography
- Location: Pushmataha County, Oklahoma
- Parent range: Ouachita Mountains
- Topo map: USGS Dunbar

Lost Mountain is a mountain in Pushmataha County, Oklahoma, located approximately 10 miles northwest of Antlers, Oklahoma. It is a part of the Kiamichi Mountains, a subrange of the Ouachita Mountains.

Its summit is 791 feet above sea level.

The commonly accepted definition of mountain calls for a mountain's summit to top 1,000 feet in elevation. In that sense Lost Mountain qualifies as a hill.

Lost Mountain is notable for its unusual isolation. It is in the middle of the valley of the Kiamichi River, and stands alone from the mountains lining either side of the valley floor. In addition, its isolation is enforced by the river, which flows around much of its base, and Spirit Lake, an ancient channel of the Kiamichi River, which lies along another side.

A fishing camp was located at the base of Lost Mountain for decades.

Aside from the mountain's unusual geological prominence, its only other cause for note occurred during the early 20th century, when a self-proclaimed religious leader, who referred to himself as the supreme deity, established a commune of his followers at the top of the mountain. Traces of their residency still exist, in the form of hand-dug water wells. Squatters who defied authority, the mountain's isolation, and the ease of keeping unwanted people off the mountain made it a perfect location for their settlement.

The mountain was part of a very busy setting due to the location of Kosoma, Oklahoma—an early boomtown turned ghost town—nearby. The St. Louis and San Francisco Railway, whose tracks ran along the mountain's base, operated from the 1880s until 100 years later. Timber, logged from Lost Mountain and adjacent mountains, was shipped from the railroad depot at Kosoma. The mountain's name was most likely given during this time—the 1880s through the early 1900s (decade).

Oklahoma State Highway 2 now passes to the west of Lost Mountain, affording an excellent view of it and the river valley.
