= AT6 Monument =

Monument to RAF cadets near Moyers, Oklahoma, US

Coordinates: 34.415378°N 95.614418°W

- Big Mountain (Pushmataha County, Oklahoma)
- Flag of the Royal Air Force
- For Royal Air Force fliers who crashed into the Kiamichi Mountains during World War II
- Unveiled: February 20, 2000
- Location: near Moyers, Oklahoma
- Designed by: Allen Parsons
- Dedicated to the Spirit of Cooperation Between the U.K. and the U.S. in Memory of British Cadets Killed in These Mountains February 20, 1943

The AT6 Monument is a granite memorial to Royal Air Force cadets who were killed while on a training flight during World War II. It stands on Big Mountain, north of Moyers, Oklahoma, in the United States, and was dedicated on February 20, 2000—the 57th anniversary of the deadly crashes.

== Background ==
The United Kingdom was hard-pressed to train Royal Air Force cadets during World War II, since the skies over Britain were an aerial battleground.

British student pilots were sent to Australia, Canada, South Africa and the United States for training. In the U.S. they were sent to a number of states—among them Oklahoma and Texas. In Oklahoma they established RAF training schools at Miami and Norman, and in Texas they established one at Terrell. Courses of instruction included navigation, meteorology, aero engines, and principles of flight.

Aviation cadets at Terrell superimposed a map of Europe over Texas, Oklahoma, Arkansas, New Mexico and Mississippi. As their "zero milestone" they chose Terrell to serve as "London, England". Radiating outward from Terrell, at precise mileages, were the following stand-in cities:

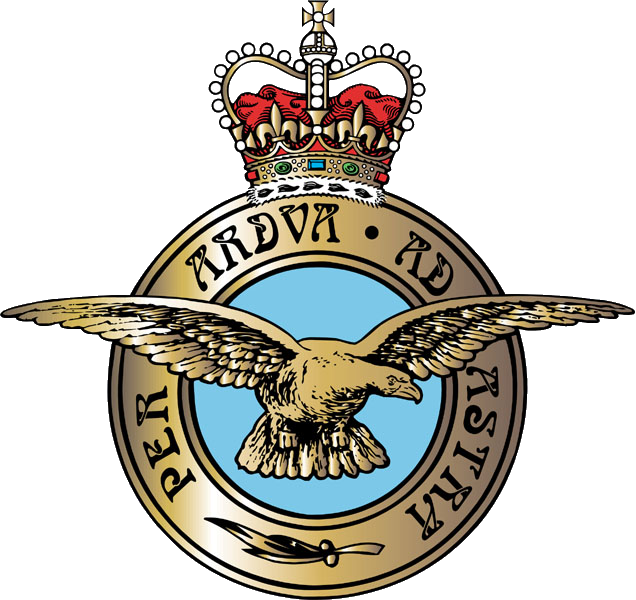
Seal of Great Britain's Royal Air Force--it is engraved on the AT6 Monument

- Albuquerque, New Mexico, as Warsaw, Poland
- Beaumont, Texas, as Paris, France
- Henderson, Texas, as Dunkirk, France
- Lubbock, Texas, as Cork, Ireland
- Turner, Arkansas, as Emden, Germany
- Vicksburg, Mississippi, as Cologne, Germany

An important part of training included frequent flight time in the cockpit. Training flights served this purpose, to acquaint the student fliers with real-life conditions in flight. Training flights often flew in formations of aircraft, to mimic real-world conditions during war.

== Crashes ==
On February 20, 1943, a British training flight departed its airbase at Terrell, Texas—known as the No. 1 British Flying Training School—en route for the No. 3 British Flying Training School at Miami, Oklahoma.

The students were flying a formation of twelve training aircraft known as AT-6s. The AT-6—an acronym for "Advanced Trainer"—was first manufactured in 1930. It was a two-seater, one-engine trainer plane.

Their objective was to complete a low-level, cross-country training flight. Poor weather hampered the flight, however, particularly as they approached the Kiamichi Mountains of Pushmataha County, Oklahoma. According to local residents the weather was unfavorable. One, Lee Stone, described ground conditions as very foggy, with a rainy mist. Another, Calvin Moyer, who was attempting to hunt hogs, stopped due to the fog, which made it hard to see.

The pilots encountered similar conditions in the air—and had not been briefed to expect them, or what to do if encountering them. Several planes turned back to Terrell, but others continued. Twelve pilots eventually landed at Miami as planned, but three planes encountered serious difficulties.

"I found myself in the classic situation—trapped in a valley with no confident idea of where we were nor where the high ground might be," said John Wall, one of the three beleaguered pilots. By this point the three troubled pilots found themselves over the Kiamichi Mountains, which rise progressively in elevation from south to north. The valley to which Wall referred is the Impson Valley, which is framed by steep mountains to its east and west.

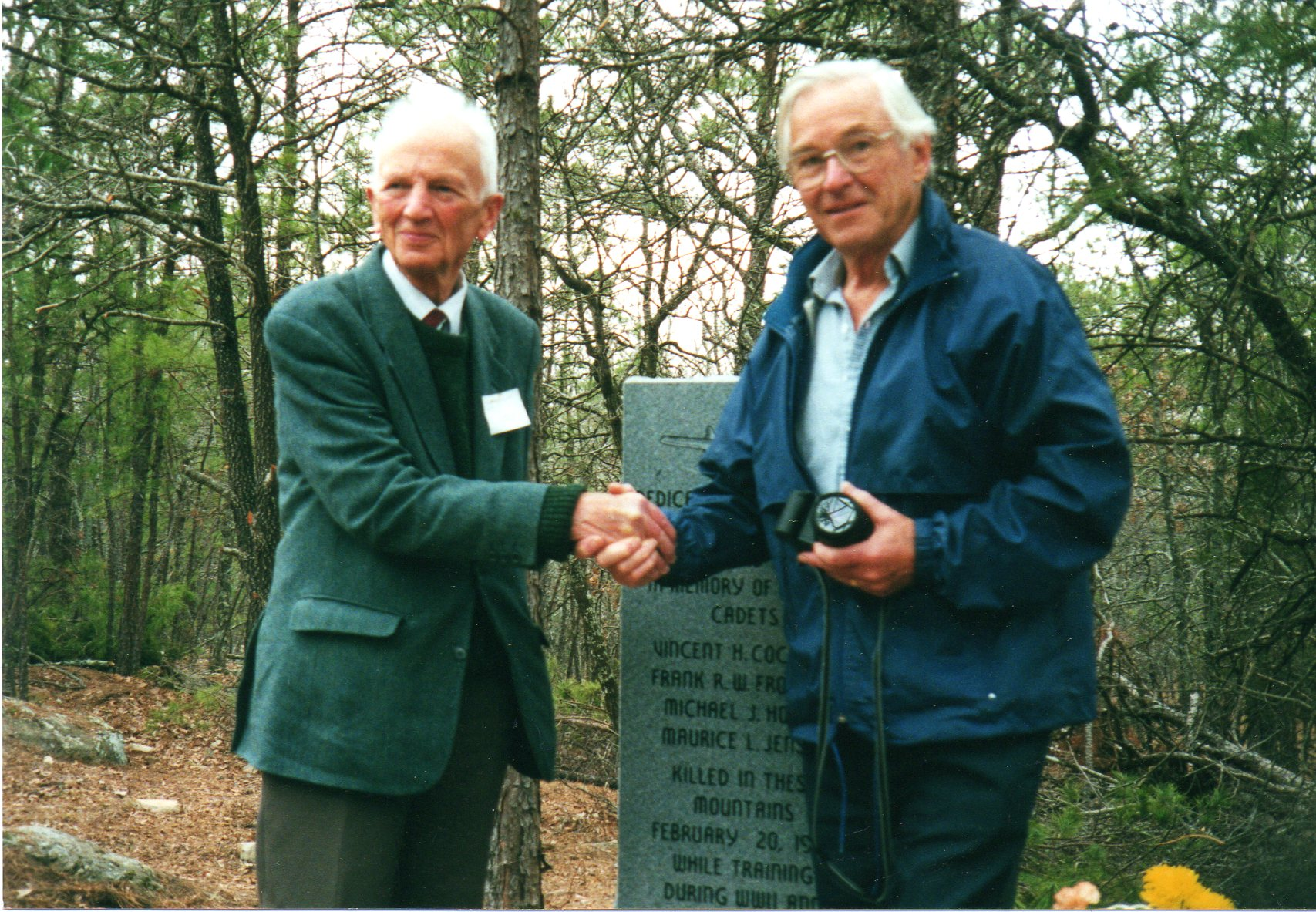
Wilbur Wright (left) and John Wall (right), who crash-landed their plane successfully, at the monument to their fallen comrades.

Pilot Wall and his navigator, "Wilbur" Wright, made the difficult decision to land on the floor of Impson Valley, rather than risk themselves and their plane in unknown territory. "I decided to make a wheels-down precautionary landing," Wall later recalled. He landed successfully in a field known as Bedford's meadow belonging to farmer and rancher Bill Perrin, outside the isolated mountain community of Jumbo.

"We were shortly surrounded by the local folk who looked after us extremely well," Wall said. A young family, Mr. and Mrs. E.F. Jordan, gave them overnight accommodations.

Things took a tragic turn for the worse regarding the other two planes, which found themselves on a path several miles to the east, taking them over the rural community of Moyers, Oklahoma, behind which the mountains rise precipitously.

The pilots successfully cleared Rodney Mountain (764 feet), then passing over Moyers. Immediately behind Moyers is White Rock Mountain (1,023 feet), and one AT-6 crashed into its steep southern slope. The plane slid into a tree, killing its crew. W.E. McMahan and other local would-be rescuers who ascended the mountain believed the fliers would have lived had the plane not impacted the tree. They also believed the pilot, Vincent Henry Cockman, 20, of Ilford, England, had lived for a short time after the crash as his head was turned to face the body of his navigator, Frank Frostick, 21, of North Walsham, England.

The third missing plane managed to pass above White Rock Mountain but apparently lost control, spiraling down into the face of Big Mountain (1,145 feet). Big Mountain, which marks the southern end of the rugged and geologically significant Johns Valley, is between the rural communities of Moyers and Kosoma.

The third wreck took longer to locate, and was not found until the next day. Piloted by Mike Hosier, 19, of Swindon, England and navigated by Maurice Jenson, 19, of Bournemouth, England, the plane came straight down into the mountain, and "struck the ground head on," according to McMahan.

What the local rescuers found on Big Mountain struck them as almost eerie: the force of the plane's impact "threw a big rock up out of the ground, making a natural tombstone." This almost uncanny circumstance remained with the men for decades, causing them to recount it many years later.

All four bodies were taken to Antlers, Oklahoma—the county seat and largest town in Pushmataha County, approximately eight miles from the crash sites—and then to Terrell, where they were interred in the British burial ground in Oakland Memorial Park cemetery.

== The monument ==
Rattan students learning the principles of flight and basics of World War II aviation in an effort to understand how and why the RAF fliers crashed.

Many years later news of the crashes came to the attention of school students in Rattan, Oklahoma—a country hamlet 12 miles east of Antlers, and over the Kiamichi Mountains from the crash sites—who elected to pursue it as a research topic.

Rattan, as a very small school, divided its boys and girls into separate reading classes—made necessary by the fact that its small, single-purpose gymnasium is not sufficiently large to accommodate both groups of students as a unisex physical education class. As a result, it scheduled girls and boys to be in reading and P.E. classes on alternating classroom periods. It was the boys’ sixth grade reading class, taught by Beth Lawless (Mrs. Bruce Lawless), which initiated the research.

After delving into the matter for several weeks the students came to believe the crash victims should be commemorated. They found it hard to believe local residents no longer remembered this unusual piece of their local World War II history, and considered it sad that four grieving families had been left in England during the war, with no sense of proper closure brought to the affair.

The boys decided to erect a marker at the crash site on Big Mountain. The site, located in a level glade, is adjacent to an old logging road in an area known as the Kiamichi Wilderness. In addition, it had the additional merit of being known—the crash site on White Rock Mountain is much less accessible, and the local rescuers, who were by then in their 70s and 80s, were unable to take the students to the location.

A local craftsman who builds cemetery grave markers donated his time and labor. The students undertook a fund-raising campaign to raise the money necessary for materials. They were successful, and the resulting marker is made of granite, tall and perpendicular, and engraved with information about the crash.

The students then undertook locating surviving family members in England, and again were successful. Families of all four fliers were found, in addition to John Wall and Wilbur Wright themselves. Wall had since the war moved to New Zealand.

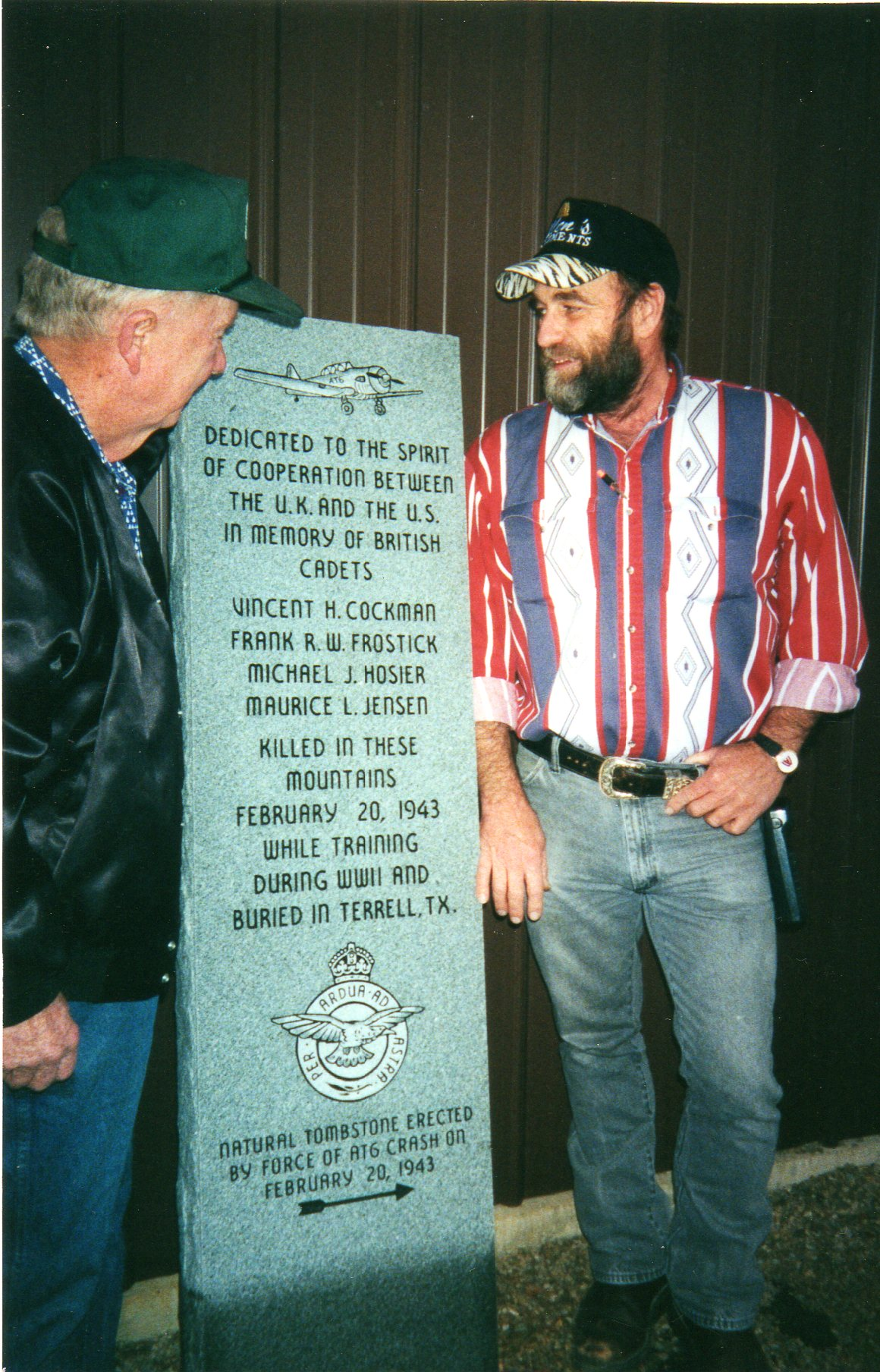
The AT6 Monument prior to installation. Its stonemason, who volunteered his services to the students, stands at right.

Word reached British Airways and Air New Zealand of the students’ endeavor. British Airways donated 18 free tickets for the students’ use, and Air New Zealand offered to fly John Wall to the ceremony, free of charge. The students used the British Airways tickets to fly all survivors, plus flier Wright, to Dallas, Texas—for later transportation to Oklahoma. Several members of the British press corps also accompanied the flights, including reporters from the British Broadcasting Corporation and The Daily Telegraph and Daily Mail newspapers, as well as a local newspaper from a county seat.

The marker was dedicated on February 20, 2000—the 58th anniversary of the crash landings. According to guest registers and the Oklahoma Highway Patrol, over 1,000 people crowded onto the mountaintop for the ceremony. News of it was broadcast throughout England, and reported in many newspapers around the world after being carried on the Associated Press wire service.

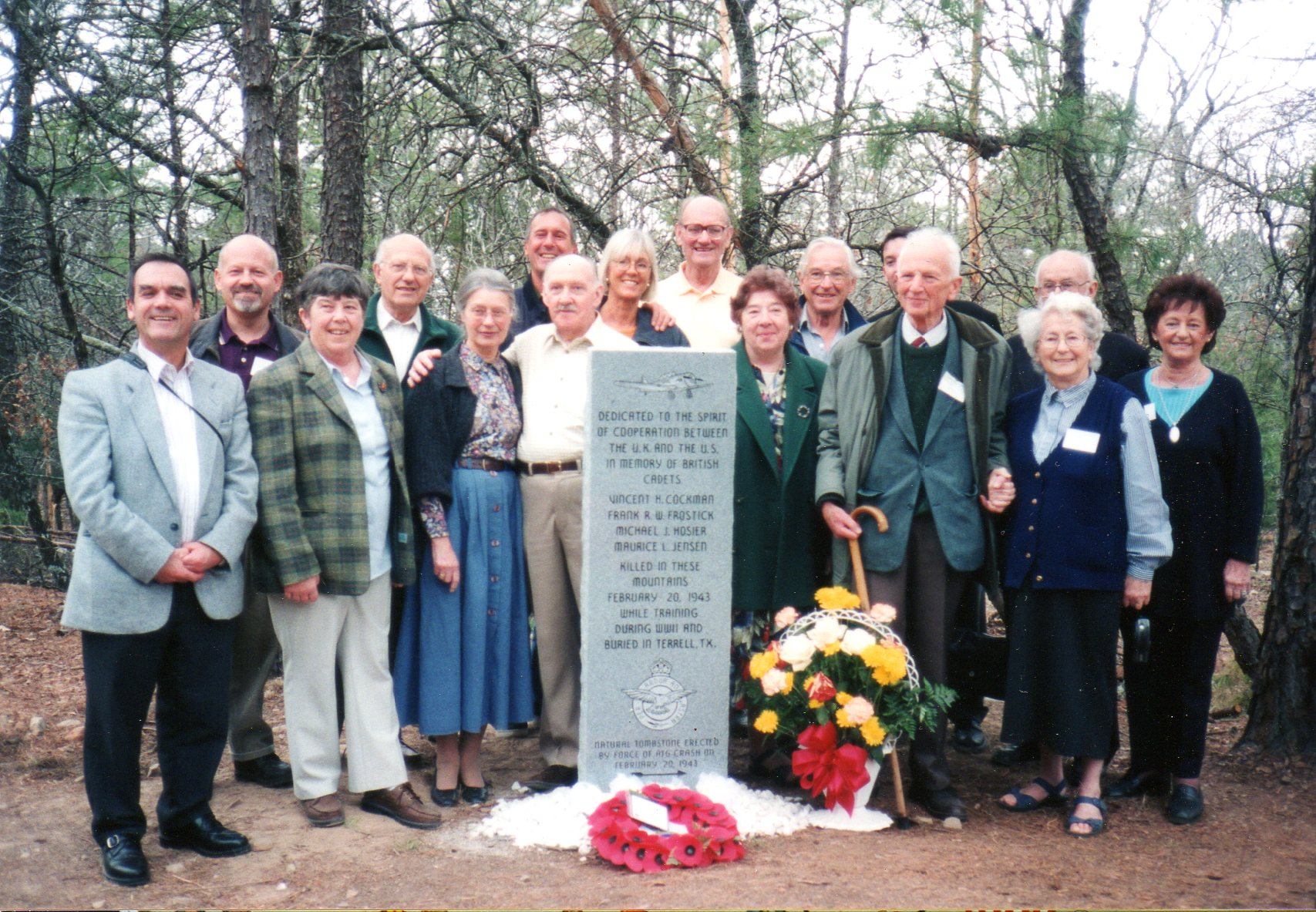
Surviving family members of all four British fliers killed in the crashes came from England to attend the dedication of the AT6 Monument. Shown here also is Wilbur Wright and John Wall, the two crash survivors.

Special guests included the assistant air attachés from the embassies of the United Kingdom and New Zealand, in Washington, D.C., and also the British vice consul assigned to the American Southwest, from Houston. All three remarked that this was one of the most unusual and moving events of their diplomatic and military careers—the students, who were from a poor and rural area, had taken on an impossible task—and accomplished it themselves.

The marker stands next to the "natural tombstone" in a quiet glade of pine trees. The site is easily reachable from Oklahoma State Highway 2—a sign erected by the Oklahoma Highway Patrol (originally intended for use on the day of commemoration, but also as a gift to the students by grateful troopers) guides would-be visitors from the turn-off approximately two miles north of Moyers.

Recalling that long-ago day in 1943, John Wall drew his thoughts to a conclusion, telling the students, "Turning back sooner would have been the smart thing—but then, youth always presses on."

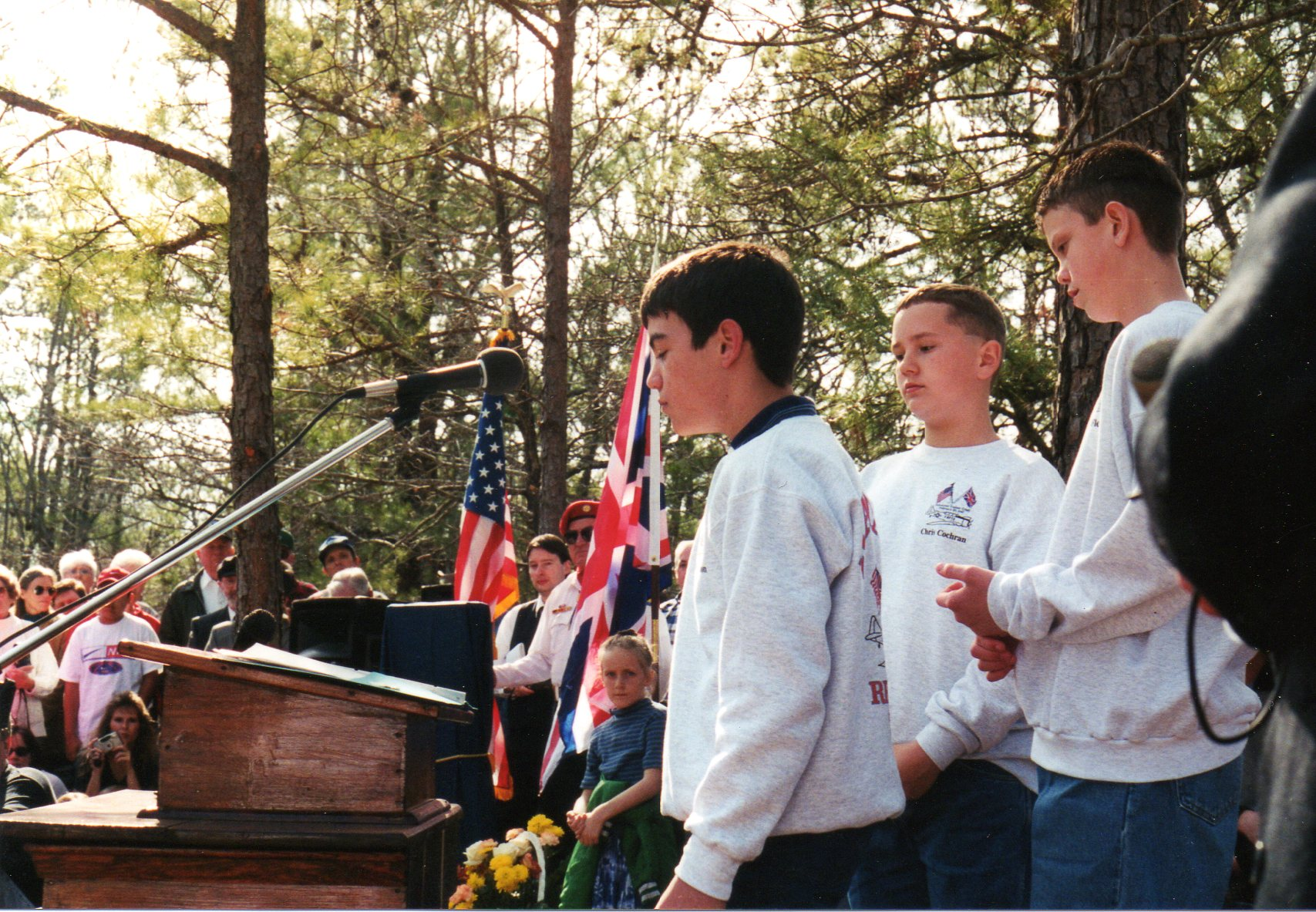
Students unveiling and dedicating their AT6 Monument, leading a program of their own devising--a fitting end to a surprising initiative, before a crowd of over 1,000.

== Yearly Commemorations ==
Small remembrance ceremonies have taken place at the monument each year since the original one in 2000. The Choctaw Nation's Color Guard has presented and retired the colors—including Britain's Union Jack—and the Antlers chapter of Veterans of Foreign Wars has assisted, hosting receptions in its lodge hall following the ceremonies on the mountain.

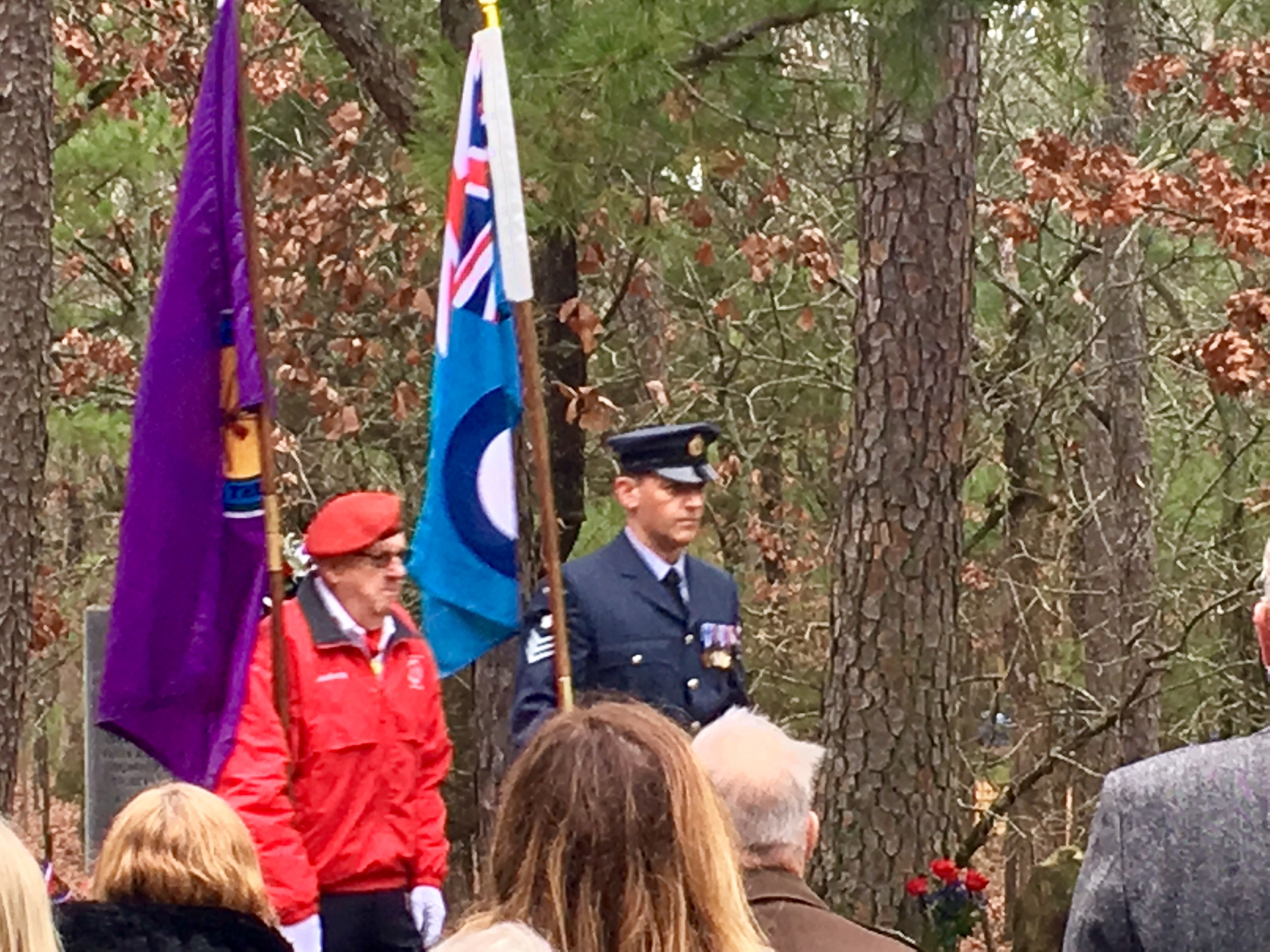
Members of the Choctaw Nation Color Guard and Britain's Royal Air Force retiring colors following rededication of the AT6 Monument on Big Mountain.

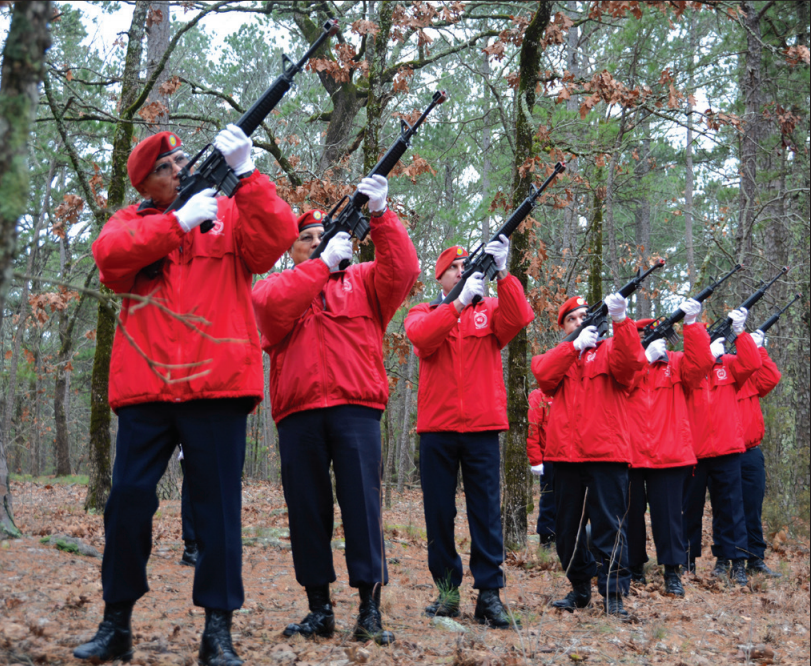
The Choctaw Nation Color Guard firing a 21-gun salute in honor of the fallen RAF fliers, during rededication of the AT6 Monument in February 2018.

During recent years a detachment of Royal Air Force officers stationed in Texas has participated, coming annually to join local residents in remembering their fallen. The officers occasionally spend an informal “work day” at the site, clearing brush and making sure the central gathering spot remains clear. Residents of the mountain, and others, also maintain the site.

A rededication of the monument took place in 2018, to mark the 75th anniversary of the crashes. Britain's Consul General to the United States, along with a group of Royal Air Force officers and their families, visitors from England, a group from Terrell, Texas and local residents, gathered at the site. The Choctaw Nation assisted with logistics, and its Chief and Assistant Chief hosted the gathering. Its Color Guard presented and retired the colors, this time accompanied by the RAF detachment. School students from Rattan, some of whom are Choctaw Indians, sang “God Save the Queen” and laid roses on the “natural tombstone.”

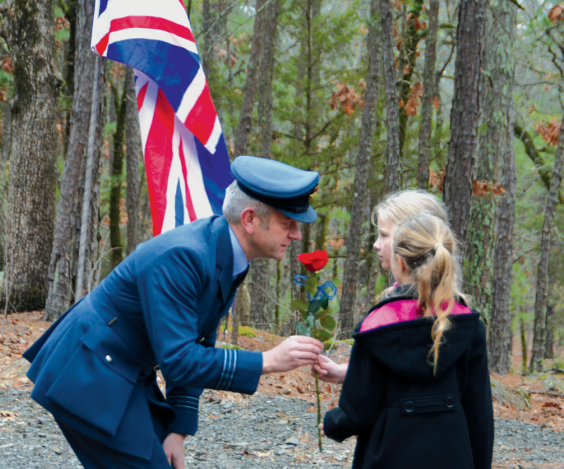
Royal Air Force Squadron Leader Maj. Craig O'Donnell presenting roses to students from Rattan, Oklahoma, for them to place near the AT6 Monument during its rededication in 2018.
