= Grahamite =

General
- Category: Organic mineral
- Crystal system: Amorphous

Identification
- Color: Black

Grahamite, also known as Pyrobitumen or Anthraxolite, is a bitumen-impregnated rock (asphaltite). It is a naturally occurring solid hydrocarbon bitumen with a relatively high fixed carbon rate of 35–55% and high temperature of fusion. It occurs in Cuba, Mexico, and in West Virginia and Oklahoma, United States. Grahamite found in the Impson Valley of southeastern Oklahoma is known as impsonite.

Grahamite was named by Henry Wurtz after James Lorimer Graham, who was interested in commercial development of this mineral in West Virginia.
