= Impsonite =

Bituminous substance

Impsonite is a black, carbonaceous substance, with a specific gravity of 1.10–1.25 and a carbon content of 50–85%. It is described as an asphaltic pyrobitumen. It is believed to be derived from a fluid bitumen which polymerized after filling a vein. The term was coined by George Homans Eldridge in 1901, referring to the asphaltic material in the Impson Valley in southeastern Oklahoma, later known as the Jumbo mine. The asphaltic material in the Impson Valley was later reclassified as grahamite, based on solubility and chemical similarities with the type grahamite of West Virginia.
