= Rodney Mountain =

Coordinates: 34°17′54″N 95°38′28″W

Rodney Mountain is located in Pushmataha County, Oklahoma, approximately five miles northwest of Antlers, Oklahoma. It is a part of the Kiamichi Mountains, a subrange of the Ouachita Mountains, and forms its southwest-most extremity. Its summit is 767 feet above sea level. It is found at GPS coordinates (latitude and longitude) 34.2984336 and −95.6410833.

The commonly accepted definition of mountain calls for a mountain's summit to top 1,000 feet in elevation. In that sense Rodney Mountain qualifies as a hill. Certain of its physical characteristics, however—its rugged nature and often-steep slopes—suggest its name is not a misnomer.

Rodney Mountain is named for Rodney Moyer, an early resident of the area, whose family patriarch, Roy A. Moyer, lent his name to Moyers, Oklahoma, the community north of Rodney Mountain. Rodney Moyer is thought to have left the area prior to Oklahoma's statehood to participate in Alaska's Klondike gold rush. He did not return, and his place and date of death are unknown.

For several years a United States Post Office was in operation in the area to serve those living nearby. It was called Rodney, Oklahoma. Oklahoma State Highway 2, built in the 1950s, now traverses the mountain and makes local transportation a simple matter. Until it opened, however, the mountain was the bane of good roads. The Antlers-to-Moyers road, particularly the segment at the mountain's base near Ten Mile Creek, was particularly problematic. Boulders and other rocks littered its slopes and the roadway.

The Kiamichi River flows adjacent to the mountain, and Rodney Crossing, a low-water ford in the area, was for decades a locally important transportation link.
