= Rodney, Oklahoma =

Ghost Town in Oklahoma, United States

Coordinates: 34.296°N 95.629°W

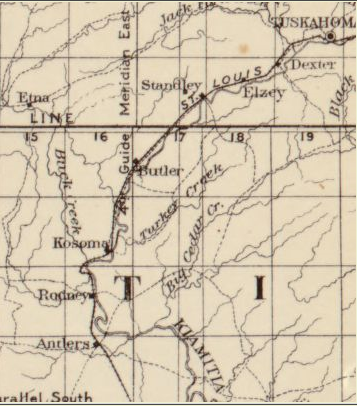
Map showing location of Rodney, Indian Territory, circa 1898.

Rodney is a former community in Pushmataha County, Oklahoma, United States, five miles north of Antlers.

A United States Post Office was established at Rodney, Indian Territory on June 30, 1890, and closed on July 5, 1899. The community was named for Rodney Moyer, early-day resident. It was located at the site of Rodney Crossing, a low-water ford on the Kiamichi River.

During the short life of the community, it was located in Jack’s Fork County, Choctaw Nation, in the Indian Territory. It was astride the St. Louis and San Francisco Railway, as well as Rodney Crossing, an important river ford where a north–south trail crossed the Kiamichi.

An important local landmark is Rodney Mountain (767 ft.), also named for Rodney Moyer.

The community was a "saw mill town", centered on the activities, commerce and bustle generated by its sawmill. As timber was cleared from nearby mountainsides, the sawmill relocated to other areas deeper within the mountains. Rodney, which had never developed a population base or economic mainstay other than the mill, went out of existence.

Rodney's namesake, Rodney Moyer, left the area to participate in Alaska's Klondike gold rush at about the time of the community's disestablishment, according to information made available to the Pushmataha County Historical Society. His time and place of death are not known.

== See also ==
- List of ghost towns in Oklahoma
