= Moyers, Oklahoma =

Moyers
- Unincorporated community and Census designated place
- Location within the state of Oklahoma Moyers (the United States)
- Coordinates: 34°19′32″N 95°39′01″W
- Country: United States
- State: Oklahoma
- County: Pushmataha

Area
  - Total: 0.67 sq mi (1.74 km^{2})
  - Land: 0.66 sq mi (1.72 km^{2})
  - Water: 0.0077 sq mi (0.02 km^{2})
- Elevation: 469 ft (143 m)

Population (2020)
  - Total: 60
  - Density: 90/sq mi (34.9/km^{2})
- Time zone: UTC-6 (Central (CST))
  - Summer (DST): UTC-5 (CDT)
- FIPS code: 40-49750
- GNIS feature ID: 2805343

Moyers is an unincorporated community located in Pushmataha County, Oklahoma, United States.

As of the 2020 census, Moyers had a population of 60.

== History ==
A permanent settlement has existed at the site of modern Moyers since at least the 1880s.

During the 1880s the St. Louis-San Francisco Railway, more popularly known as the “Frisco”, built a line from north to south through the Choctaw Nation, connecting Fort Smith, Arkansas with Paris, Texas. The railroad paralleled the Kiamichi River throughout much of its route in present-day Pushmataha County, Oklahoma. Train stations were established every few miles to aid in opening up the land and, more particularly, to serve as the locations of section houses. Supervisors for their respective miles of track lived in the section houses to administer the track and its right-of-way. These stations also served as points at which the trains could draw water.

The site of the future Moyers was selected because of its proximity to the Kiamichi River, with its abundant water supply. Adjacent station stops were established at Kosoma, Oklahoma, to the north, and Davenport—now Kellond, Oklahoma—to the south.

The sparsely populated area, at that time known as Jack’s Fork County, a part of the Pushmataha District of the Choctaw Nation, in the Indian Territory, was home to Choctaw Indians who farmed or subsisted on the land. Few roads or trails existed. But with the railroad came white settlers, seeking commercial opportunities.

Kosoma became an immediate boomtown, home to a thriving timber industry. Sawmills were established in the mountains surrounding the town and the mills used Kosoma’s railroad depot as a transshipment point. Moyers remained tiny and insubstantial until Kosoma’s decline in the early 1900s (decade), when its local forests had all been logged.

In addition to timber, other natural resources, including mining, were important in the regional economy. An asphalt mine was established at Jumbo, northwest of Moyers, and a tram, or railroad, was built from Moyers northwest through the Kiamichi Mountains to Jumbo. Railroad cars were loaded with asphalt at the mine and was brought via the tram to Moyers’ depot. Although the rails have long since been taken up, the tram’s elevated track bed—a significant man-made structure—is still clearly evident from a quarter-mile west of the Moyers school along its route around Parker Mountain.

The first known mention of Moyers occurred in 1904, when an Antlers newspaper referred to the settlement as “Moyer’s Spur”. The term may have referred to the tram, which was a rail spur off the Frisco Railroad, and “Moyer” was a reference to Roy Abraham Moyer, a local settler. It was not until 1910 that Moyer’s Spur became known as “Moyers”, the name it continues by today. It received its United States Post Office on June 7, 1895.

In addition to logging and the railroad, Moyers became home to additional industry in 1907 when the Gulf Pipe Line Company—which was constructing a natural gas pipeline northward from the Texas gulf coast—built a pumping station southwest of the settlement, near Ten Mile Creek in the Rocky Point area. The pumping station was an important facility for the pipe line, and kept it operational for many miles north and south in either direction. A sizeable crew was stationed there, and was popular among local townspeople in Moyers and Antlers.

Lumber would prove as beneficial to Moyers as it did earlier to Kosoma. The Walker-Hopkins Lumber Company established a presence there which proved so profitable that, by 1911, it built a sizable new store and office. From those humble origins it grew so that in succeeding decades Moyers came to resemble a “company town” – Walker-Hopkins owned many of the stores, homes, and much of the property in the town. It operated large lumber yards and a sawmill which came to employ many local men and lend Moyers what it has not had since: an industrial skyline complete with chimneys, towering machinery and conveyors. It remained in operation through the 1950s, after which its closure sent Moyers into a steep decline.

Transportation was provided by the Frisco Railroad, which offered six trains per day—three in each direction—until it closed to passenger traffic during the late 1950s. It continued freight operations until 1981, when it closed altogether and its rails were removed. The loss of passenger rail coincided with the construction of Oklahoma State Highway 2. It offered a paved, graded route all the way from Antlers to north of Moyers, at the turn-off to Baugh’s Prairie and Big Mountain. It was completed in the 1980s. Until this time overland transportation was problematic at best—particularly the portion of road at Rodney Mountain (itself named after Rodney Moyer), between Moyers and Kellond.

The road, where it passed the foot of Rodney Mountain near Ten Mile Creek, “…is so rough that a farmer going to town with a can of cream, found that the cream had been churned, and he had butter,” according to one observer in 1926. Local conditions stayed pretty much the same until the opening of the state highway thirty years later.

During World War II the Moyers area was the site of two lethal air crashes. British pilots operating from a Royal Air Force base in Texas crashed into White Rock Mountain and Big Mountain, killing four crew men. Two planes were destroyed. A third plane crash-landed successfully at Jumbo. On February 20, 2000 the AT6 Monument was dedicated in the fliers' honor at the crash site on Big Mountain. Over 1,000 people attended the ceremony, and the story was carried by the British Broadcasting Corporation and many newspapers around the world.

Moyers, at this writing, has a post office, one general store and one church, and a number of homes, both in the immediate vicinity and adjacent areas. It has regained its public junior high and high school –lost during the 1960s—and now educates local children from kindergarten through 12th grade. The schools athletic teams are known as the Moyers Tigers, and Lady Tigers. Over 100 years after lending the settlement its name, the Moyer family and descendants of Abraham Moyer continue to reside on the Moyer Ranch in the community today.

== Topography ==
Moyers is located in a very picturesque area with varied topography. To its south is Rodney Mountain. To its immediate north is Parker Mountain, with the taller Whiterock Mountain rising behind it. East of Moyers is the Kiamichi River, and west is a relatively flat expanse connecting it to the Impson Valley. Buck Creek, a well-watered and dependable spring-fed stream rising in the mountains north of Whiterock Mountain, flows through a sharply defined valley north of Moyers to its confluence with the Kiamichi. Ten Mile Creek—also spring-fed but more seasonally-dependent—flows east and south of Moyers. Two significant manmade structures are nearby, and due to their size and permanence have become a part of local topography: the elevated beds of the rail spur winding around the base of Parker Mountain, and the Frisco Railroad.

== Demographics ==
Historical population
Census	Pop.	Note	%±
2020	60		—
U.S. Decennial Census

=== 2020 census ===
As of the 2020 census, Moyers had a population of 60. The median age was 51.0 years. 11.7% of residents were under the age of 18 and 41.7% of residents were 65 years of age or older. For every 100 females there were 130.8 males, and for every 100 females age 18 and over there were 165.0 males age 18 and over.

0.0% of residents lived in urban areas, while 100.0% lived in rural areas.

There were 35 households in Moyers, of which 31.4% had children under the age of 18 living in them. Of all households, 54.3% were married-couple households, 22.9% were households with a male householder and no spouse or partner present, and 14.3% were households with a female householder and no spouse or partner present. About 17.2% of all households were made up of individuals and 5.7% had someone living alone who was 65 years of age or older.

There were 35 housing units, of which 0.0% were vacant. The homeowner vacancy rate was 0.0% and the rental vacancy rate was 0.0%.

Racial composition as of the 2020 census
Race	Number	Percent
White	43	71.7%
Black or African American	0	0.0%
American Indian and Alaska Native	7	11.7%
Asian	1	1.7%
Native Hawaiian and Other Pacific Islander	0	0.0%
Some other race	2	3.3%
Two or more races	7	11.7%
Hispanic or Latino (of any race)	6	10.0%
