= Henry Wurtz =

American chemist

- Born: 5 June 1828; Easton, Pennsylvania, USA
- Died: 1910 (aged 81–82)
- Education: Princeton University; Harvard University

Henry Wurtz (5 June 1828 in Easton, Pennsylvania – 1910) was an American chemist. He graduated from Princeton in 1848, and then studied chemistry at the Lawrence Scientific School of Harvard. In 1851, he became instructor at the Yale (now Sheffield) Scientific School, and from 1853 to 1855 he was chemist to the geological survey of New Jersey. He was chosen professor of chemistry at the medical college in Kingston, Canada in 1857, and a year later accepted a similar chair at the National Medical College in Washington, D. C. At the same time he was examiner in the chemical division of the United States Patent Office until 1861. Later, Prof. Wurtz moved to New York.

== Career ==
His original work included:

- the discovery of the mineral hisingerite in America (1850);
- the invention of methods for the production of alum from greensand marl and potassium chloride and potassium sulfate from similar sources (1850);
- methods of preparing pure Alkalies and alkaline earths (1852).
- applications of sodium amalgams (1865).
- new modes of manufacture of fuel gas by the alternating action of air and steam on cheap coal (1869).
- the production of magnesia by precipitation from seawater by means of calcium hydroxide (1877).
- the discovery of the minerals animikite and huntilite (1878).
- a new method of concentrating and caking granular materials of all kinds by mixing with small percentages of metallic iron and a solution of ferrous sulfate (1882), and
- a new method of distilling coal to obtain liquid products.

Wurtz was engaged until 1888 in perfecting processes by means of which greater yields of the heavy paraffin oils, paraffin wax, carbolic acid, and other products can be obtained from coals of all kinds more quickly, also in developing the generation of electricity by methods the chemical products of which will be of sufficient value to pay all costs. Prof. Wurtz entered the employ of Thomas A. Edison as chemist in October, 1888. In 1876 he served as a judge on the international jury of awards at the World's fair in Philadelphia, making a special report on The Chemistry of Japan Porcelain and Porcelain Minerals, and in 1877 the degree of Ph.D. was conferred on him by Stevens Institute of Technology. From 1868 until 1874, he was editor of the American Gas-Light Journal, and he was assistant editor in the chemical department of Johnson's Universal Cyclopædia. He has made numerous reports to various corporations, and is the author of about sixty scientific memoirs. The mineral Wurtzilite was named after him by Professor George Frederick Kunz.
