= Jumbo, Oklahoma =

Unincorporated Community in Oklahoma, United States

Coordinates: 34°26′43″N 95°44′08″W

Jumbo is an unincorporated community in western Pushmataha County, Oklahoma, United States, 10 miles north of Miller.

== History ==
A United States Post Office was established for Jumbo, Indian Territory on November 8, 1906. The post office took its name from the Jumbo Asphalt Company, a prominent local employer.

Prior to Oklahoma's statehood, Jumbo was located in Jack's Fork County, a part of the Pushmataha District of the Choctaw Nation, in the Indian Territory.

Jumbo was blessed by abundant natural resources, including asphalt. Hugh W. Adams (ca. 1836-1905), one of the original pioneers of Antlers, Oklahoma, and a prospector, located the asphalt vein at Jumbo. The Jumbo Asphalt Company established mining operations there and, by 1904, the community was known as Jumbo Mines. By 1905 the company was mining up to eight tons of asphalt per day, which it shipped to Moyers, Oklahoma via a dedicated tram line. The line stretched from Jumbo south through the Impson Valley, rounding the foot of Parker Mountain into Moyers, where it connected with the railhead at the St. Louis and San Francisco Railway.

By 1906, Jumbo Mines was home to at least 40 families. This remained the case through recent decades, when the countryside around Jumbo emptied due to lack of economic opportunities and its churches, school, and post office closed.

In November 1910, Jumbo was site of a horrible accident. The mine—whose shaft was 280 feet deep, at which point it branched several hundred feet to the north—experienced a lethal explosion. At least 14 miners were killed, and more died later of wounds. Several miners were blown up the shaft and out the mouth of the mine. Ten of the miners were buried side by side in the Jumbo Cemetery. At the time of the explosion, the mine was owned by the Choctaw Asphalt Company of St. Louis, Missouri. It continued to operate for years; today the mouth of its shaft is capped but may still be seen off the Jumbo Road.

During the Great Depression, the WPA built a public school at Jumbo. The school was built using native "red rock" gathered from nearby fields. The school still partially stands, although the back half was bulldozed during the 1990s by a local landowner for safety reasons, who cleared the land for cattle to graze.

Jumbo's Impson family cemetery grave markers have been lost. Immediately prior to World War II, a local farmer gathered the tombstones, stacked them under a tree, and ploughed the property for use as a field. The property today is overgrown with bois d'arc trees and difficult to access.

During World War II, Jumbo and Moyers were the site of mishaps with international repercussions, two of them fatal. British pilots operating from a Royal Air Force base in Texas, hampered by poor weather, crashed into White Rock Mountain and Big Mountain above Moyers, killing four crewmen. Two planes were destroyed.

A third plane crash-landed successfully at Jumbo, in a field known locally as the Bedford meadow, owned by farmer and rancher Bill Perrin. Its pilot, John Wall, and navigator, "Wilbur" Wright, were unhurt and were kept overnight by a local family, Mr. and Mrs. E.F. Jordan. British military officers soon retrieved the airplane, which was salvageable.

On February 20, 2000 the AT6 Monument was dedicated in the fliers' honor at the crash site on Big Mountain. Wall and Wright also attended, and had a happy reunion with the Perrin family. Over 1,000 people attended the ceremony, and the story was carried by the BBC and many newspapers around the world.

More information on Jumbo and the Impson Valley may be found in the Pushmataha County Historical Society.

== Geography ==
Jumbo is located in the picturesque Impson Valley. Buck Creek and Box Springs mountains frame the eastern side of its valley, and Long Mountain frames the western side. In recent years the territory to the west of Jumbo has been incorporated into McGee Creek State Park, particularly the area of Wildcat and Bugaboo canyons.

== Transportation ==
Despite improvements in the local roadways, Jumbo remains physically isolated from other communities in Pushmataha and Atoka counties. This is ironic, as the four-lane Indian Nation Turnpike was built through Impson Valley, passing just to the east of the community, and opened in 1970. It features no interchange for Jumbo, however, causing local residents to venture to Daisy on the north to enter or exit the turnpike.
