= Buck Creek (Kiamichi River tributary) =

Stream in Oklahoma, US

Coordinates: 34°20′14″N 95°38′26″W

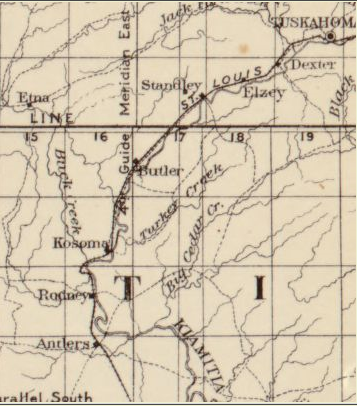
Map of the Indian Territory showing Buck Creek, c. 1898. It was considered a prominent stream.

Buck Creek (Choctaw: Lapitta Bok) is a 38.9-mile-long (62.6 km) stream in Pushmataha County, Oklahoma. It flows generally southward from its headwaters in the western Kiamichi Mountains to its confluence with the Kiamichi River.

== Description ==
Buck Creek rises in southern Pittsburg County and proceeds southwest into the McGee Valley in Atoka County. Turning east, it runs into Buck Creek Mountain and turns south, entering Pushmataha County. The creek cuts through several water gaps, first between 1,024-foot (312 m) White Rock Mountain and Horsehead Mountain, then between White Rock Mountain and Big Mountain, and finally between Parker Mountain and Little Mountain just before its confluence with the Kiamichi. The creek is spring-fed along its entire length, ensuring a minimal and steady flow of water year-round. For much of its course it flows through a narrow, steeply-sided, winding valley. Due to the numerous ravines and smaller creeks which feed it, Buck Creek rises rapidly during heavy rains. Its principal tributaries are Kimbrough, Little Kimbrough and Horsehead creeks.

Spectacular formations of boulders, many of them as large as houses or buildings, line portions of the Buck Creek valley.

== History ==
Buck Creek played a role during the Civil War as a camp, 20 miles (32 km) southwest of Fort Smith, for Confederate forces under General Douglas H. Cooper during an incident known as "Marston's Skirmish. In August 1864, Cooper detached Captain B.W. Marston, Acting Adjutant-General, with Captain Samuel H. Gunter of Stand Watie’s Cherokee troops, and four other men to cross the Arkansas River and reconnoiter Federal forces north of the river. The men swam across the river, where they captured some Federal weapons, horses and money. Then they swam back across the Arkansas and reported back to Cooper's camp.

During the years following the 1880s, when the region was opened to development by the arrival of the St. Louis-San Francisco Railway—whose track crossed Buck Creek at its mouth on the Kiamichi River—its valley provided a route into the mountains and was used by loggers. Extensive logging took place throughout the creek watershed, and its timber was brought down to the railroad via a railroad tram constructed up the creek valley. Floods did great damage to the tram, and it was eventually closed.

Until construction of Oklahoma State Highway 2, which bridged the stream, Buck Creek was a serious impediment to overland transportation in the Kiamichi River valley. A low-water ford was used, but was unreliable and unsafe due to frequent floods or other periods of high water.

== Proposed dams ==
The Oklahoma Water Resources Board has in past contemplated building a flood-control dam on Buck Creek, but those plans no longer appear under active consideration, particularly since construction of dams impounding Jack’s Fork Creek for Sardis Lake and the lower Kiamichi River (Hugo Lake). The U.S. Army Corps of Engineers more recently studied the idea of damming several tributaries of the river below Sardis Lake—Buck Creek, Ten Mile Creek, Pine Creek and Cedar Creek—to better regulate and restore the river’s health and temperature. Given fiscal restraints and public sentiment—which no longer favors construction of dams—no activity is anticipated.
