= Kiamichi River =

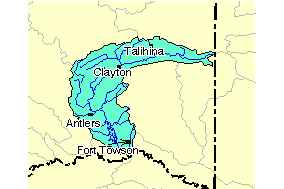
- The Kiamichi River watershed

Location
- Country: United States
- State: Oklahoma

Physical characteristics
- Source
  - location: Polk County, Arkansas
  - coordinates: 34°40′46″N 94°27′09″W
- Mouth
  - coordinates: 33°57′40″N 95°13′46″W
  - elevation: 114 m (374 ft)
- Discharge
  - location: Antlers
  - average: 1,615 cu ft/s (45.7 m^{3}/s)

Basin features
- River system: Red River

The Kiamichi River is a river in southeastern Oklahoma, United States of America. A tributary of the Red River of the South, its headwaters rise on Pine Mountain in the Ouachita Mountains near the Arkansas border. From its source in Polk County, Arkansas, it flows approximately 177 miles (285 km) to its confluence with the Red River at Hugo, Oklahoma.

== Name source ==
The origin of the word Kiamichi is a matter of debate and may never be fully known. Most accounts say the word is a French word, which has been transliterated phonetically, for "horned screamer" or "noisy bird," a reference to woodpeckers or other birds living along the river's banks. The spelling of the modern word was not standardized until the twentieth century, making its origin more difficult to determine. The Antlers News, a newspaper published in what was then Antlers, Indian Territory (now in Oklahoma) first used the spelling "Kiamichi" in November 1900. Prior to this, the newspaper, along with other authoritative sources, spelled the name of the river as "Kiamichia" or "Kiamitia" (the latter is closest to a French spelling).

Muriel H. Wright suggested that Kaimichi may be from the French word kamichi, which meant "horned screamer", and possibly referred to the whooping cranes along the river. Other spellings of the name have included: Kiomitchie, Cayameechee, Kiamisha, Kimesha, Kimichy, and Kimishi. Another possibility could be the Kichai tribe of the area and dates back to time of Caddo indians.

== Geography ==
From Pine Mountain the Kiamichi River flows southwest, past Muse, Whitesboro, Albion, Tuskahoma and Clayton to Antlers, where it turns abruptly southeast, flowing in this direction to its confluence with Red River.

For much of its journey the river flows through the picturesque and highly defined Kiamichi River valley, framed by mountains of the same name. Pine Mountain, at approximately 2,600 feet (790 m), is the highest, although the mountains lining its course, such as Flagpole Mountain at Clayton, are significant, rising generally between 900 feet (270 m) and 1,800 feet (550 m). At Antlers the river meets the massive geological formation known as Standpipe Hill, forcing its turn to the southeast. From Antlers to the Red River the Kiamichi is generally characterized by flowing through a broad alluvial plain, particularly on its approach to the Red.

Two lakes impound the river or its tributaries: Sardis Lake and Hugo Lake. Sardis Lake, named for the small settlement displaced during its construction, impounds Jack's Fork Creek. Hugo Lake, named for the nearby town of Hugo, impounds the river itself. Both are flood-control reservoirs built and operated by the U.S. Army Corps of Engineers. Additional, smaller dams have impounded the waters of the tributaries over time, mostly for the purpose of powering sawmills and other light, localized industry.

Notable geological features of the Kiamichi River valley include McKinley Rocks, the Potato Hills, Rock Town, and Lost Mountain.

=== Tributaries ===
Major tributaries of the Kiamichi River include Anderson Creek, Big Cedar Creek, Buck Creek, Buffalo Creek, Gates Creek, Jacks’ Fork Creek, Pine Creek, Tenmile Creek and Waterhole Creek.

== Watershed ==
=== Drainage area ===
The area of the river's watershed is 1,830 square miles (4,700 km^{2}).

== History ==
=== Prehistoric era ===
The Kiamichi River defined its region during prehistoric days. Its valley provided the only convenient means of traversing the region from north to south—much as now—and Native American peoples used it as a corridor. The Native Americans who lived in the region prior to European colonization of the Americas were generally Caddo, who were nomads. The powerful Caddoan Mississippian culture based at Spiro Mounds held sway over the Kiamichi River valley, which formed a part of its trade network.

Archaeological finds across the Kiamichi River basin attest to early life in its valley. A prehistoric fish weir, or trap, in the river in Pushmataha County, excavated by the Oklahoma Archeological Survey, is a particularly revealing site. Ancient Indians diverted the flow of the river with walls of stone to create a chute into which fish would flow. Radiocarbon dating of charred hickory and pecan hulls found at the site indicate a date of approximately 1,200 BC. Also found were stumps of cypress trees, a tree which has not grown in that portion of the county in perhaps hundreds of years.

Over 220 archaeological sites have been identified in Pushmataha County alone, indicating how widespread ancient and more recent settlement was in the region prior to European settlement. Of those sites, three date from at least 8,000 years ago; 145 date from between 2,000-8,000 years ago; and 22 date from between 500–1000 years ago.

=== Modern era ===
Discovery by Europeans occurred in 1719, when French explorer Bernard de la Harpe explored the Kiamichi River valley. French explorers were quickly followed by French fur trappers; they named most of Oklahoma's rivers.

American explorers followed French ones, and were the first organized scientific surveys of the Kiamichi River. Thomas Nuttall traversed the Kiamichi and Little River valleys in 1819 and Stephen H. Long explored the Kiamichi River in 1821. Nuttall and Long were the precursors of empire; the region was actively settled by Choctaw Indians displaced from elsewhere in the United States starting in 1832.

After the relocation of the Choctaw Nation to the Indian Territory in 1832, the river defined the political boundary or border between counties and districts. Forming an easily recognizable geographic frontier, it served in this capacity until Oklahoma's statehood in 1907, when the Choctaw Nation ceased to exist and its political subdivisions were eliminated. A Choctaw county was named after the river, although generally using the Choctaws’ spelling, Kiamitia. The river formed the eastern boundary of Jack's Fork County and Kiamitia County, and the western boundary of Cedar County and Towson counties.

Navigability of the Kiamichi River was an important goal but proved elusive due to a massive logjam in the Red River which prevented river traffic from going much beyond Nachitoches. In 1825 the Arkansas legislature petitioned the United States Congress to remove the Great Raft, as the logjam was called, so that boats could ply the Red River as far west as the mouth of the Kiamichi and the newly established Fort Towson. Within several years, the Army Corps of Engineers had done so.

Security along the Red River, the United States' (US) international frontier with the Spanish Empire was a concern, and the US established a chain of forts along the border. Fort Towson in the Choctaw Nation was one. It was built on Gates Creek near the mouth of the Kiamichi. A military road was built from Fort Smith to Fort Towson through the valley of Little River, switching to the Kiamichi River near its southern terminus.

During the American Civil War, the last Confederate Army troops to surrender did so at Fort Towson on June 23, 1865. The Confederate States government had disintegrated by this time, and its individual armies surrendered one by one. While the surrender of Robert E. Lee at Appomattox, Virginia signaled the end to the conflict, it did not truly end until the surrender of the last fighting Southern troops at Fort Towson.

Transportation in the Kiamichi River valley was revolutionized between 1882 and 1887 with the construction of the St. Louis and San Francisco Railroad, commonly known as the Frisco. Part of a national network connecting Fort Smith, Arkansas with Paris, Texas, the railway was constructed parallel to the Kiamichi River from Talihina to Kellond, a small settlement three miles north of Antlers, Oklahoma. With the train came the telegraph and later the telephone.

The coming of the Frisco stimulated settlement in the Choctaw Nation by European Americans and European immigrants. Population centers formed around each of the railroad's station stops, stimulated by trade and new markets. The river was important as a source of fresh, plentiful water for the trains, several of which ran daily.

The frequent Frisco service encouraged developers to come for resource extraction. Timber companies and individual loggers soon moved in. Over the next several decades, they cleared the old-growth forest in the Kiamichi Mountains. Forestry remains the area's chief industry. Numerous rail spurs were developed from the Frisco outward along the creek valleys stretching away from the river. Large saw mill operations became common in the valleys for processing the lumber.

During World War II, a training flight conducted by Britain's Royal Air Force—flying from a base in Texas—went awry in poor weather and two planes crashed. One crashed into the south slope of White Rock Mountain above Moyers, Oklahoma, and the other on Big Mountain between Moyers and Kosoma. Two fliers lost their lives in the latter crash. In 2000 school children from Rattan, Oklahoma erected the AT6 Monument in their honor on Big Mountain.

Also during World War II, the U.S. Navy honored the river with the launch of the USS Kiamichi, hull number AOG-73, built by St. Johns River Shipbuilding in Jacksonville, Florida. She launched on August 17, 1945, three days after the surrender of Japan. Because of the end of the war, completion of the ship was canceled on August 29. A Klickitat-class gasoline tanker, she was later completed for International Tankers of Panama. The ship was renamed Transmere in 1951 and in 1952 was sold to Colombia; it was renamed Sancho Jimeno.

On October 29, 1961, President John F. Kennedy visited Big Cedar, east of Talihina, Oklahoma to give a speech marking the opening of U.S. Route 259.

In August 1975 the Kiamichi River made national news when its bottomlands were the scene of a days-long hunt for two elephants that had escaped from a circus in Hugo, Oklahoma. They were found at Hugo Lake.

== Recreation ==
Fishing and hunting are common along the river, as is boating. American Whitewater, a private organization, defines seven miles of the river near Big Cedar as a "Class II-III rapid". In these upper reaches of the river, kayaking is a popular sport among tourists. In Hugo Lake, boating and camping are popular. Sardis Lake has yet to be tapped for large-scale tourism, but its campgrounds are well used. Some boating and waterskiing takes place on the lake.

In 1988 Congress created the Upper Kiamichi River Wilderness. Defined as a territory at and below the headwaters of the Kiamichi River at Pine Mountain and Rich Mountain, the wilderness now encompasses 9,754 acres. It is part of the National Wilderness Preservation System. A portion of the river's watershed is also protected by the Ouachita National Forest.

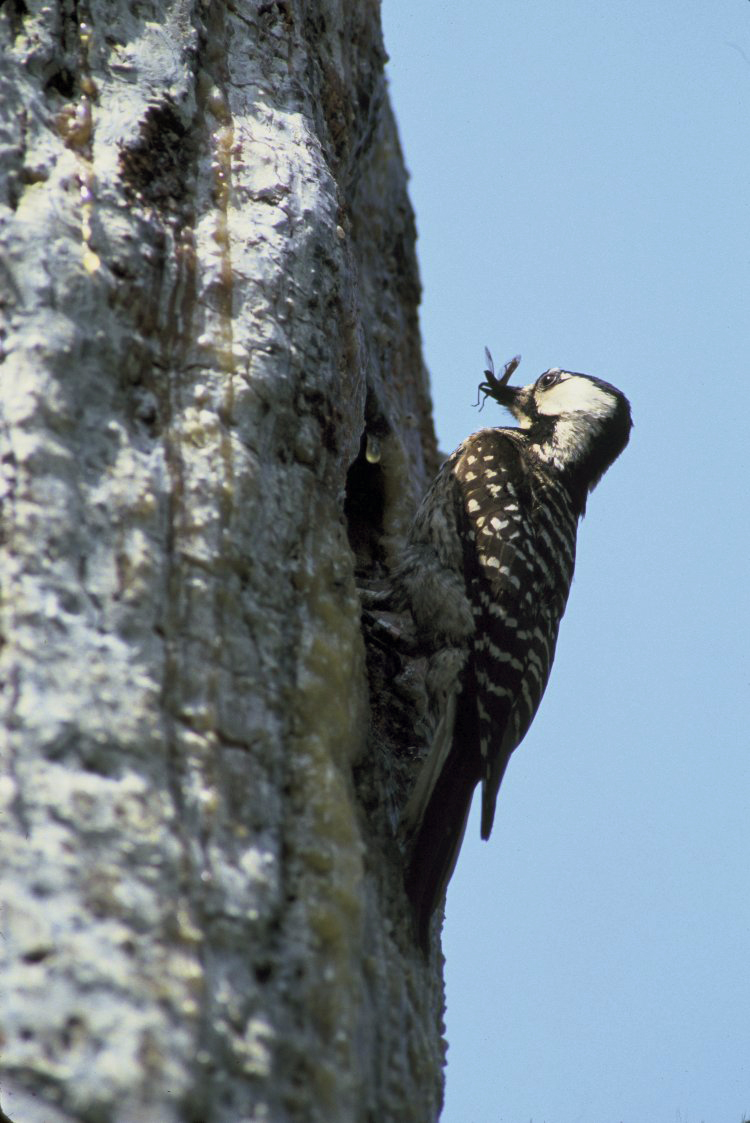
Red-cockaded woodpecker

== Wildlife ==
Three federally designated endangered species occupy the river valley – the Indiana bat, red-cockaded woodpecker and leopard darter. It is also home to a variety of mussels, including several that are somewhat rare.

The Kiamichi River has been studied since at least 1894, when the first scientific fish collection was made at Walnut Creek at Albion, Oklahoma. This collection netted 36 different kinds of fish. Since construction of Sardis and Hugo dams in the 1970s and 1980s the river has suffered in environmental quality. Its mussels decreased significantly below the inflow from Sardis dam, and almost extinguished as a species below the inflow from Hugo dam. Nonetheless 101 species of fish still survive, and in some cases thrive, in the river.

== In popular culture ==
The Kiamichi is the subject of the 2025 documentary Drowned Land, directed by Colleen Thurston. The documentary follows the fight of residents of the river valley and concerned water protectors to stop a series of proposed development projects on the Kiamichi.
