= Choctaw language =

Muskogean language spoken in US

Choctaw
- Chahta anumpa
- Native to: United States
- Region: From Southeastern Oklahoma, to east-central Mississippi and into Louisiana and Tennessee
- Ethnicity: 20,000 Choctaw (2007)
- Native speakers: 9,600 (2015 census)
- Language family: Muskogean: Western; Choctaw

Official status
- Official language in: Choctaw Nation

Language codes
- ISO 639-2: cho
- ISO 639-3: cho
- Glottolog: choc1276
- ELP: Choctaw
- Current geographic distribution of the Choctaw language

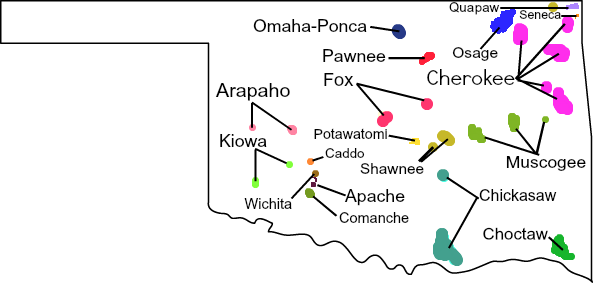
- Distribution of Native American languages in Oklahoma

- People: Chahta
- Language: Chahta anumpa
- Country: Chahta Okla

The Choctaw language (Choctaw: Chahta anumpa), spoken by the Choctaw, an Indigenous people of the Southeastern Woodlands, US, is a member of the Muskogean language family. Choctaw is a separate but closely related language to Chickasaw.

The Choctaw Nation of Oklahoma published the New Choctaw dictionary in 2016.

== Dialects ==
There are three dialects of Choctaw (Mithun 1999):

1. "Native" Choctaw on the Choctaw Nation in southeastern Oklahoma
2. Mississippi Choctaw of Oklahoma on Chickasaw Nation of south-central Oklahoma (near Durwood)
3. Choctaw of the Mississippi Band of Choctaw Indians near Philadelphia, Mississippi

Other speakers live near Tallahassee, Florida, and with the Koasati in Louisiana, and also a few speakers live in Texas and California.

== Phonology ==
- More information on suffixes is in the Morphology section.

=== Consonants ===
	Labial	Alveolar		Palatal	Velar	Glottal
	Labial	median	lateral	Palatal	Velar	Glottal
Nasal	m	n				
Stop^{1}	p b	t			k	ʔ^{2}
Affricate				ch [tʃ]		
Fricative	f	s^{3}	ɬ	sh [ʃ]^{3}		h
Approximant			l	y [j]	w	

1. The only voiced stop is /b/. The voiceless stops /p/, /t/, and /k/ may become partially voiced between vowels, especially /k/ and for male speakers. Also, the voiceless stops are slightly aspirated at the onset of words and before stressed syllables, behaving like English voiceless plosives.
2. Controversially, some analyses suggest that all nouns end in an underlying consonant phoneme. Nouns apparently ending in a vowel actually have a glottal stop /ʔ/ or a glottal fricative /h/ as the final consonant. Such consonants become realized when suffixes are attached.
3. The distinction between phonemes /s/ and /ʃ/ is neutralized at the end of words.

==== Free variation ====
- There is free variation of some consonants in Choctaw with some speakers:
1. /ɬ/, the voiceless lateral fricative, is pronounced as a voiceless dental fricative [θ]: /ɬ/→[θ].
2. The voiceless labiodental fricative /f/ is pronounced as a voiceless bilabial fricative [ɸ]: /f/→[ɸ].

==== Phonological processes of consonants ====
- In Choctaw /k/, the voiceless velar plosive, is often pronounced as [ɣ], a voiced velar fricative, between vowels.

/k/→[ɣ]/V_V
im-ofi-aki̱lih → [ɪmofijəɣẽːlih]
III-dog-indeed
'his own dog'

- The voiceless glottal fricative /h/ is often pronounced like a voiceless palatal fricative [ç] when it precedes the voiceless palato-alveolar affricate /tʃ/.

/h/→[ç]/_tʃ
katihchish → [katɪçtʃɪʃ]
'how'

=== Vowels ===
	Short^{1}		Long	Nasal^{2}
	tense	lax	Long	Nasal^{2}
Close front	i	ɪ	iː	ĩː~ẽː
Close-mid back	o	ʊ	oː	õː
Open central	a	ə	aː	ãː

1. Lax vowels occur more often in closed syllables. In traditional orthography, ʋ usually indicates [ə] and u usually indicates [ʊ]. Exceptions include pokoli (traditional) for /pʊk.koli/, imalakusi for /imaːlakosi/. The traditional orthography does not distinguish lax and tense front vowels; instead it indicates /iː/ with e.
2. Nasal vowels are intrinsically long.

==== Pitch ====
1. In Choctaw, very few words are distinguished only by pitch accent. Nouns in Choctaw have pitch realization at the penultimate syllable or the ultimate syllable. Verbs in Choctaw will have pitch realization at morphemes indicating tense, but sometimes, pitch directly precedes the tense morpheme.

=== Syllable structure ===
Syllables of Choctaw
Light	example	meaning
V	a.bih	'to kill'
CV	no.sih	'to sleep'
Heavy	example	meaning
VV	ii.chih	'to drive'
CVV	pii.ni'	'boat, train'
V̱	a̱.chi'	'quilt'
CV̱	ta̱.chi'	'corn'
VC	ish.ki'	'mother'
CVC	ha.bish.ko'	'nose'
Superheavy	example	meaning
VVC	óok.cha-cha	'she/he woke up and ...'
CVVC	náaf.ka	'dress'
V̱C	a̱t	'come and'
CV̱C	ok.hi̱sh	'medicine'

1. As is in the chart above, there are three syllable structure types in Choctaw: light, heavy, and super heavy. Possible syllables in Choctaw must contain at least one vowel of any quality.
2. Syllables cannot end with a consonant clusters CC. However, there is an exception with the structure *(C)VCC if a word in Choctaw ends with the suffix /-t/.
3. Syllables do not begin with consonant clusters CC, but there is an exception in an initial /i-/ deletion, which results in a syllable *CCV .

==== Rhythmic lengthening ====
- Rhythmic lengthening is the process of lengthening the vowel duration of an even-numbered CV syllable in Choctaw. However, vowels at the end of words are not permitted to undergo that process. Also, if an even-numbered syllable is a verbal prefixes class I or III, the affix's vowel may not undergo lengthening, and the same holds true for noun prefixes class III as well.

CV-CV-CVC→CV-CV꞉-CVC
salahatok→sala꞉hatok

==== Smallest possible word ====
- The smallest possible word in Choctaw must contain either two short vowels or one long vowel.
  ofi' 'dog'
  waak 'cow'
- /a-/ insertion: there are verbs with only one short vowel in their roots. Without an affix attached to the verb root, the verbs become impossible utterances because Choctaw requires either two short vowels or a long vowel for a word to be formed. An initial A-prefix is thus attached to the root of the verb.

*bih → a-bih

=== Phonological processes ===
==== Glide insertion ====
- When a verb root ends with a long vowel, a glide /w/ or /j/ is inserted after the long vowel.
- ∅→/wa/ / V꞉____
1. Where V꞉ is oo
2. boo-a-h→bóowah
- ∅→/ja/ / V꞉____
1. Where V꞉ can be either ii or aa
2. talaa-a-h→talaayah

==== /i-/ deletion ====
- In Choctaw, there is a group of nouns which contain an initial /i-/ that encodes for 3rd person possession. It may be deleted, but if the /i/ is part of a VC syllable structure, the C is also deleted, because the resulting CCV syllable is rarely a permissible syllable structure at the onset of words.

/i/→∅ / #____
Part 1: /i + C/→∅ + /C/ / #____
Part 2: /∅ + C/→∅ / #____
ippókni'→ppókni'→pókni'

==== /-l-/ infix assimilation ====
- The verbal infix /l/ is pronounced /h, ch, or ɬ/ when /l/ precedes a voiceless consonant.

l → {h, tʃ, ɬ} /_C_{[-voice]}
ho-l-tinah → ho-ɬ-tinah

==== Phonological processes of the suffix /-li/ ====
- There are several assimilation processes that occur with the suffix /-li/. When the verbal suffix /-li/ is preceded by /f/ /ɫ/ /h/ /m/ /n/ or /w/, the /l/ assimilates to the corresponding consonant that precedes it. Also, the verbal suffix /-li/ is preceded by the consonant /b/, the /l/ is realized as /b/. Third, when the verbal suffix /-li/ is preceded by the consonant /p/, the /p/ is pronounced as /b/. Lastly, when the verbal suffix /-li/ is preceded by the consonant /t/, the /t/ is pronounced as /l/.

/l/→/f, ɫ, h, m, n, w/ / /f, ɫ, h, m, n, w/____
/kobaf-li-h/→ kobaaffih

/l/→/b/ / /b/____
/atob-li-h/→ atobbih

/p/→/b/ / ____/l/
/tap-li-h/→ tablih

/t/→/l/ / ____/l/
/palhat-li-h/→ pallalih

- There are two deletion processes that occur with the suffix /-li/. If the verbal suffix /-li/ precedes the verbal suffix /-tʃi/, the suffix /-li/ may be deleted if the resulting syllable, after deletion, is a consonant cluster. The other process occurs when the verbal suffix /-li/ precedes the suffix /-t/, which results with the suffix /-li/ being sometimes deleted if the syllable /-li/ has not already gone under phonological processes as described above.

/li/→∅ / ____/tʃi/
balii-li-chi-h→balii-chi-h

/li/→∅ / ____/t/
balii-li--h→balii-t

==== Schwa insertion ====
- Schwa insertion: when a glottal fricative /h/ or a velar stop /k/ precedes a voiced consonant within a consonant cluster, a schwa /ə/ is inserted to break up the consonant cluster.

∅→/ə/ / /h/____[+voiced] consonant
∅→/ə/ / /k/____[+voiced] consonant
'ahnih'→/ahənih/

==== Vowel deletion ====
- Vowel deletion is the process of a short vowel being deleted at a morpheme boundary. It occurs when an affix containing a short vowel at the morpheme boundary binds to a word that also contains a short vowel at the morpheme boundary.
1. For most vowel deletion cases, the preceding short vowel is deleted at the morpheme boundary.

V→∅ / ____V
/baliili-aatʃĩ-h/→baliilaatʃĩh

1. If a class II suffix attaches to a word that results with two short vowels occurring together, the short vowel that follows the class II suffix is deleted.

V→∅ / V____
/sa-ibaa-waʃoohah/→sabaa-waʃoohah

== Orthography ==
Choctaw alphabet comparison

The Choctaw "Speller" alphabet as found in the chata Holisso Ai Isht Ia Ʋmmona – The Choctaw Spelling Book, 1800s.

The Choctaw linguistic alphabet as found in the Choctaw Language Dictionary by Cyrus Byington and edited by John Swanton, 1909.

The Modern Choctaw alphabet as used by the Mississippi Band of Choctaw Indians, Present.

IPA	Linguistic	CBTC	Mississippi	Traditional	Byington/Swanton
Vowels
a	a				
i	i				
o	o				
Long
aː	aa	á	á	a	
aː	aa	á	ā	a	
iː	ii	í	í	e, i	
iː	ii	í	ī	e, i	
oː	oo	ó	ó	o	
oː	oo	ó	ō	o	
Nasal
ãː	a̱		ą	a̱	aⁿ
+C	a̱		ą	am, an	
ĩː	i̱		į	i̱	iⁿ
+C	i̱		į	im, in	
õː	o̱		ǫ	o̱	oⁿ
+C	o̱		ǫ	om, on, um, un	
Lax
ə	a			ʋ	ạ
ɪ	i				
ʊ	o			u	
Consonants
b	b				
tʃ	ch		č	ch	
f	f				
h	h				
k	k				
l	l				
ɬ	lh		ł	hl, lh	ł, lh
m	m				
n	n				
p	p				
s	s				
ʃ	sh		š	sh	
t	t				
w	w				
j	y				
ʔ	ꞌ	∅			

The written Choctaw language is based upon the English version of the Roman alphabet and was developed in conjunction with the "civilization program" of the United States, a program to westernize and forcefully assimilate Indigenous Americans, particularly those adhering to what were to become the Five Civilized Tribes (of which the Choctaw are a part) into Anglo-American Culture and Sympathies during the early 19th century. Although there are other variations of the Choctaw alphabet, the three most commonly seen are the Byington (Traditional), Byington/Swanton (Linguistic), and Modern (Mississippi Choctaw).

Many publications by linguists about the Choctaw language use a slight variant of the "modern (Mississippi Choctaw)" orthography listed here, where long vowels are written as doubled. In the "linguistic" version, the acute accent shows the position of the pitch accent, rather than the length of the vowel.

The discussion of Choctaw grammar below uses the linguistic variant of the orthography.

1. Choctaw Bible Translation Committee
2. Substituted with 'v' according to typesetting or encoding constraints.
3. The former is used before a vowel; the latter, before a consonant. The intervocalic use of ⟨hl⟩ conflated the common consonant cluster /hl/ with /ɬ/.
4. Dictionary editors John Swanton and Henry Halbert systematically replaced all instances of ⟨hl⟩ with ⟨ł⟩, regardless whether ⟨hl⟩ stood for /ɬ/ or /hl/. Despite the editors' systematic replacement of all ⟨hl⟩ with ⟨ł⟩, the digraph ⟨lh⟩ was allowed to stand.

== Morphology ==
=== Verbal morphology ===
Choctaw verbs display a wide range of inflectional and derivational morphology. In Choctaw, the category of verb may also include words that would be categorized as adjectives or quantifiers in English. Verbs may be preceded by up to three prefixes and followed by as many as five suffixes. In addition, verb roots may contain infixes that convey aspectual information.

==== Verb prefixes ====
The verbal prefixes convey information about the arguments of the verb: how many there are and their person and number features. The prefixes can be divided into three sorts: agreement markers, applicative markers, and anaphors (reflexives and reciprocals). The prefixes occur in the following order: agreement-anaphor-applicative-verb stem.

===== Agreement affixes =====
The agreement affixes are shown in the following chart. The only suffix among the personal agreement markers is the first-person singular class I agreement marker /-li/. Third-person is completely unmarked for class I and class II agreement arguments and never indicates number.

person markers			class I			class II		class III		class N		imperative	
person markers			+s	+C	+V	+C/i	+a/o	+C	+V	+C	+V	+C	+V
first-person	singular	initial	-li			sa-	si-	a̱-	am-	ak-		n/a	
first-person	singular	medial	-li			sa-	si-	-sa̱-	-sam-	ak-		n/a	
first-person	paucal		ii-		il-	pi-		pi̱-	pim-	kii-	kil-	n/a	
first-person	plural		ii-		il-	hapi-		hapi̱-	hapim-	kii-	kil-	n/a	
second-person	singular		is-	ish-		chi-		chi̱-	chim-	chik-		∅	
second-person	plural		has-	hash-		hachi-		hachi̱-	hachim-	hachik-		ho-	oh-
third-person			∅			∅		i̱-	im-	ik-			

Some authors (Ulrich 1986, Davies, 1986) refer to class I as actor or nominative, class II as patient or accusative and class III as dative. Broadwell prefers the neutral numbered labels because the actual use of the affixes is more complex. This type of morphology is generally referred to as active–stative and polypersonal agreement.

Class I affixes always indicate the subject of the verb. Class II prefixes usually indicate direct object of active verbs and the subject of stative verbs. Class III prefixes indicate the indirect object of active verbs. A small set of stative psychological verbs have class III subjects; an even smaller set of stative verbs dealing primarily with affect, communication and intimacy have class III direct objects.

====== Active verbs ======
As the chart above shows, there is no person-number agreement for third person arguments. Consider the following paradigms:

hablitok ("kicked", past tense)
^{DIRECT OBJECT} _{SUBJECT}		first-person			second-person		third-person
^{DIRECT OBJECT} _{SUBJECT}		singular	paucal	plural	singular	plural	third-person
first-person	singular	ili-habli-li-tok^{1} 'I kicked myself'	pi-habli-li-tok 'I kicked us (few)'	hapi-habli-li-tok 'I kicked us (all)'	chi-habli-li-tok 'I kicked you'	hachi-habli-li-tok 'I kicked you (pl.)'	habli-li-tok 'I kicked her/him/it/them'
first-person	plural	ii-sa-habli-tok 'we kicked me'	il-ili-habli-tok^{1} 'we kicked ourselves'		ii-chi-habli-tok 'we kicked you'	ii-hachi-habli-tok 'we kicked you (pl.)'	ii-habli-tok 'we kicked her/him/it/them'
second-person	singular	is-sa-habli-tok 'you kicked me'	ish-pi-habli-tok 'you kicked us (few)'	ish-hapi-habli-tok 'you kicked us (all)'	ish-ili-habli-tok^{1} 'you kicked yourself'	ish-hachi-habli-tok 'ýou kicked you (pl.)'	ish-habli-tok 'you kicked her/him/it/them'
second-person	plural	has-sa-habli-tok 'you (pl.) kicked me'	hash-pi-habli-tok 'you (pl.) kicked us (few)'	hash-hapi-habli-tok 'you (pl.) kicked us (all)'	hash-chi-habli-tok 'you (pl.) kicked you'	hash-ili-habli-tok^{1} 'you (pl.) kicked yourselves'	hash-habli-tok 'you (pl.) kicked her/him/it/them'
third-person		sa-habli-tok 'she/he/it/they kicked me'	pi-habli-tok 'she/etc. kicked us (few)'	hapi-habli-tok 'she/etc. kicked us (all)'	chi-habli-tok 'she/etc. kicked you'	hachi-habli-tok 'she/etc. kicked you (pl.)'	habli-tok "she/etc. kicked her/him/it/them" ili-habli-tok^{1} 'she/etc. kicked herself/etc.'

1. When the subject and object refer to the same thing or person (coreference), the reflexive ili- prefix is mandatory and used in place of the coreferent object.

Transitive active verbs seemingly with class III direct objects:

- Am-anoli-tok 'She/he/it/they told me.'
- Chim-anoli-tok 'She/he/it/they told you.'
- Im-anoli-tok 'She/he/it/they told him/her/it/them.'
- Pim-anoli-tok 'She/he/it/they told us.'
- Hachim-anoli-tok 'She/he/it/they told y'all.'

When a transitive verb occurs with more than one agreement prefix, I prefixes precede II and III prefixes:

Ii- chi- pi̱sa -tok
1P.I- 2S.II- see⟨NGR⟩ -PT
'We saw you.'

Ish- pim- anooli -tok.
2S.I- 1P.III- tell -PT
'You told us.'

For intransitive verbs, the subjects of active verbs typically have class I agreement. Because third-person objects are unmarked, intransitive active verbs are indistinguishable in form from transitive active verbs with a third-person direct object.

====== Stative verbs ======
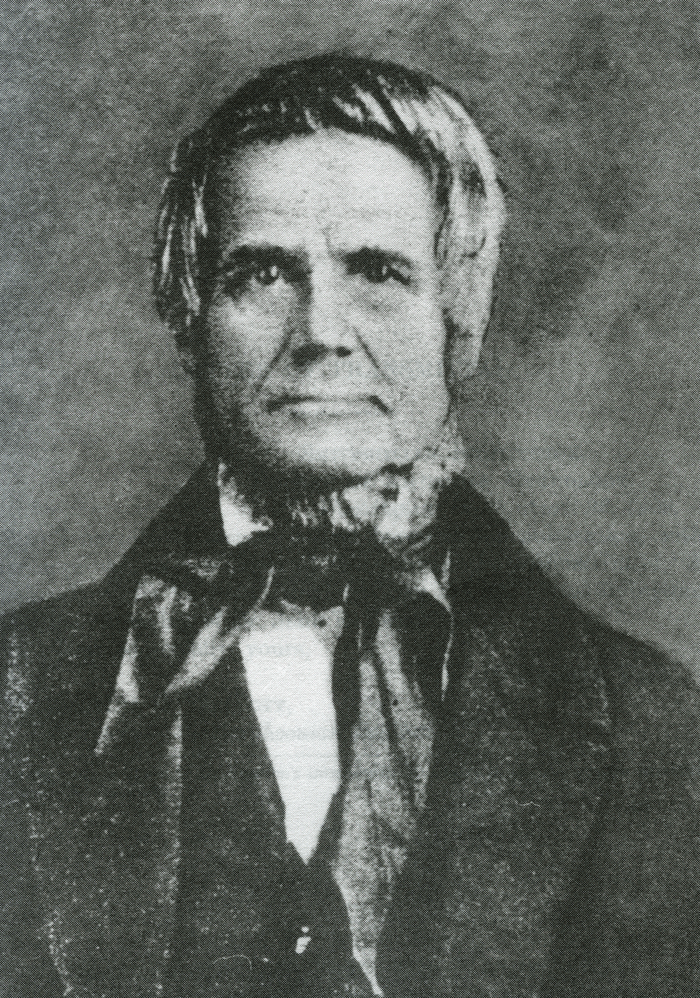
Rev. Cyrus Byington worked nearly 50 years translating the Bible into Choctaw. He traveled with the Choctaws from Mississippi to Indian Territory after their forced relocation.

The subjects of stative verbs typically have class II agreement. A small set of psychological verbs have subjects with class III agreement.

Baliili -li -tok
run -1S.I -PT
'I ran.'

Sa- niya -h.
1S.II- fat -TNS
'I am fat.'

A̱- ponna -h.
1S.III- skilled -TNS
'I am skilled.'

===== Negatives =====
The set of agreement markers labelled N above is used with negatives. Negation is multiply marked, requiring that an agreement marker from the N set replace the ordinary I agreement, the verb appear in the lengthened grade (see discussion below), and that the suffix /-o(k)-/ follow the verb, with deletion of the preceding final vowel. The optional suffix /-kii/ may be added after /-o(k)-/. Consider the following example:

Ak- iiya -o -kii -ttook
1S.N- go⟨LGR⟩ -NEG -NEG -DPAST
'I did not go.'

Compare this with the affirmative counterpart:

Iya -li -ttook.
go -1S.I -DPAST
'I went'.

To make this example negative, the 1sI suffix /-li/ is replaced by the 1sN prefix /ak-/; the verb root iya is lengthened and accented to yield íiya; the suffix /-o/ is added, the final vowel of iiya is deleted, and the suffix /-kii/ is added.

===== Anaphoric prefixes =====
Reflexives are indicated with the /ili-/ prefix, and reciprocals with /itti-/:

Ili- pi̱sa -li -tok.
REFL- see⟨NGR⟩ -1S.I -PT
'I saw myself'.

==== Verb suffixes ====
While the verbal prefixes indicate relations between the verb and its arguments, the suffixes cover a wider semantic range, including information about valence, modality, tense and evidentiality.

The following examples show modal and tense suffixes like /-aachii̱/ 'irrealis'(approximately equal to future), /-tok/ 'past tense', /-h/ 'default tenses':

Baliili -h.
run -TNS
'She runs.'

Baliili -aachi̱ -h.
run -IRR -TNS
'She will run.'

There are also suffixes that show evidentiality, or the source of evidence for a statement, as in the following pair:

Nipi awashli -hli
meat fry -FIRST:HAND
'She fried the meat.' (I saw/heard/smelled her do it.)

Nipi awashli -tok -a̱sha
meat fry -PT -GUESS
'She fried the meat.' (I guess)

There are also suffixes of illocutionary force which may indicate that the sentence is a question, an exclamation, or a command:

Awashli -tok -o̱
fry -PT -Q
'Did she fry it?'

Chahta si- a -h -okii
Choctaw 1S.II- be -TNS -EXCL
'I'm Choctaw!' or 'I certainly am a Choctaw!'

==== Verbal infixes ====
Choctaw verb stems have various infixes that indicate their aspect. These stem variants are traditionally referred to as 'grades'. The table below shows the grades of Choctaw, along with their main usage.

Name of Grade	How it is formed	When it is used
n-grade	infix n in the next to last (penultimate) syllable; put accent on this syllable	to show that the action is durative (lasts some definite length of time)
l-grade	put accent on next to last (penultimate) syllable; lengthen the vowel if the syllable is open	before a few common suffixes, such as the negative /-o(k)/ and the switch-reference markers /-cha/ and /-na/
hn-grade	insert a new syllable /-hV̱/ after the (original) next to last (penultimate) syllable. V̱ is a nasalized copy of the vowel that precedes it.	to show that the action of the verb repeats
y-grade	insert -Vyy- before the next to last (penultimate) syllable	to show delayed inception
g-grade	formed by lengthening the penultimate vowel of the stem, accenting the antepenultimate vowel, and geminating the consonant that follows the antepenult.	to show delayed inception
h-grade	insert -h- after the penultimate vowel of the stem.	to show sudden action

Some examples that show the grades follow:

In this example the l-grade appears because of the suffixes /-na/ 'different subject' and /-o(k)/ 'negative':

lowa -t taaha -na falaama -t ak- iiya- o -kii -ttook
burn -SS complete⟨LGR⟩ -DS return -SS 1S.N- go⟨LGR⟩ -NEG -NEG -DPAST
'... (the school) burned down and I didn't go back.'

The g-grade and y-grade typically get translated into English as "finally VERB-ed":

Taloowa -h
sing -TNS
'He sang.'

Tálloowa -h
sing⟨GGR⟩ -TNS
'He finally sang.'

The hn-grade is usually translated as 'kept on VERBing':

Ohó̱ba -na nittak pókkooli oshta -ttook
rain⟨HNGR⟩ -DS day ten four -DPAST
'It kept on raining for forty days.'

The h-grade is usually translated "just VERB-ed" or "VERB-ed for a short time":

Nóhsi -h
sleep⟨HGR⟩ -TNS
'He took a quick nap.

=== Nominal morphology ===
==== Noun prefixes ====
Nouns have prefixes that show agreement with a possessor. Agreement markers from class II are used on a lexically specified closed class of nouns, which includes many (but not all) of the kinship terms and body parts. This is the class that is generally labeled inalienable.

sa- noshkobo
1S.II- head
'my head'

chi- noshkobo
2S.II- head
'your head'

noshkobo
head
'his/her/its/their head'

sa- ishki
1S.II- mother
'my mother'

chi- ishki
2S.II- mother
'your mother'

Nouns that are not lexically specified for II agreement use the III agreement markers:

a̱- ki'
1S.III- father
'my father'

am- ofi
1S.III- dog
'my dog'

Although systems of this type are generally described with the terms alienable and inalienable, this terminology is not particularly appropriate for Choctaw, since alienability implies a semantic distinction between types of nouns. The morphological distinction between nouns taking II agreement and III agreement in Choctaw only partly coincides with the semantic notion of alienability.

==== Noun suffixes ====
Choctaw nouns can be followed by various determiner and case-marking suffixes, as in the following examples, where we see determiners such as /-ma/ 'that', /-pa/ 'this', and /-akoo/ 'contrast' and case-markers /-(y)at/ 'nominative' and /-(y)a̱/ 'accusative':

alla nakni -m -at
child male -that -NOM
'that boy (nominative)'

Hoshi -at itti chaaha -m -ako̱ o̱- biniili -h
bird -NOM tree tall -that -CNTR:ACC SUPE- sit -TNS
'The bird is sitting on that tall tree.' (Not on the short one.)

The last example shows that nasalizing the last vowel of the preceding N is a common way to show the accusative case.

=== Word order and case marking ===
The simplest sentences in Choctaw consist of a verb and a tense marker, as in the following examples:

O̱ba -tok
rain -PT
'It rained.'

niya -h
fat -TNS
'She/he/it is fat, they are fat.'

Pi̱sa- tok
see⟨NGR⟩ -PT
'She/he/it/they saw her/him/it/them.'

As these examples show, there are no obligatory noun phrases in a Choctaw sentence, nor is there any verbal agreement that indicates a third person subject or object. There is no indication of grammatical gender, and for third person arguments there is no indication of number. (There are, however, some verbs with suppletive forms that indicate the number of a subject or object, e.g. iyah 'to go (sg.)', ittiyaachih 'to go (du.)', and ilhkolih 'to go (pl)'.)

When there is an overt subject, it is obligatorily marked with the nominative case /-at/. Subjects precede the verb

hoshi -at apa -tok
bird -NOM eat -PT
'The birds ate them.'

When there is an overt object, it is optionally marked with the accusative case /-a̱/

hoshi -at sho̱shi (-a̱) apa -tok.
bird -NOM bug -(ACC) eat -PT
'The birds ate the bugs.'

The Choctaw sentence is normally verb-final, and so the head of the sentence is last.

Some other phrases in Choctaw also have their head at the end. Possessors precede the possessed noun in the Noun Phrase:

ofi hohchifo
dog name
'the dog's name'

Choctaw has postpositional phrases with the postposition after its object:

tamaaha bili̱ka
town near
'near a town'

== Vocabulary ==
Some common Choctaw phrases (written in the "Modern" orthography):

- Choctaw: Chahta
- hi: Halito!
- See you later!: Chi pisa la chike!
- number: holhtina/holhtini
- Thank you: Yakóki
- What is your name?: Chi hohchifo yat nanta?
- My name is...: Sa hohchifo yat...
- yes: a̱
- no: kíyo
- okay: ohmi
- I don't understand.: Ak akostiníncho.
- I don't know.: Ak ikháno.
- Do you speak Choctaw?: Chahta imanompa ish anompola hinla ho̱?
- What is that?: Yammat nanta?

Other Choctaw words:

- Cherokee: Chalaki
- Chickasaw: Chickashsha
- Seminole: Siminóli
- Creek/Muskogee: Maskóki
- today: himak nittak
- tonight: himak ninak
- tomorrow: onnakma
- yesterday: piláshásh
- month: hashi
- year: affami
- 2009: talhípa sippokni toklo akochcha chakkali
- house: chokka
- school: holisso ápisa
- cat: katos
- dog: ofi
- cow: wák
- horse: issoba/soba

Counting to twenty:

- one: achaffa
- two: toklo
- three: tochchína
- four: oshta
- five: talhlhapi
- six: hannali
- seven: o̱toklo
- eight: o̱tochchina
- nine: chakkali
- ten: pokkoli
- eleven: awahachaffa
- twelve: awahtoklo
- thirteen: awahtochchina
- fourteen: awahoshta
- fifteen: awahtalhlhapi
- sixteen: awahhannali
- seventeen: awaho̱toklo
- eighteen: awaho̱tohchínah
- nineteen: abichakkali
- twenty: pokkoli toklo

At "Native Nashville" web , there is an Online Choctaw Language Tutor, with Pronunciation Guide and four lessons: Small Talk, Animals, Food and Numbers.

== See also ==
- Choctaw Code Talkers
- List of placenames of Choctaw origin

== Sources ==
- Broadwell, George Aaron. (2006). A Choctaw Reference Grammar. Lincoln, NE: University of Nebraska Press. ISBN 0-8032-1315-8.
