= National Register of Historic Places listings in Pushmataha County, Oklahoma =

Location of Pushmataha County in Oklahoma

This is a list of the National Register of Historic Places listings in Pushmataha County, Oklahoma.

This is intended to be a complete list of the properties on the National Register of Historic Places in Pushmataha County, Oklahoma, United States. The locations of National Register properties for which the latitude and longitude coordinates are included below, may be seen in a map.

There are 9 properties listed on the National Register in the county.

This National Park Service list is complete through NPS recent listings posted March 21, 2025.

== Current listings ==
| | Name on the Register | Image | Date listed | Location | City or town | Description |
|---|---|---|---|---|---|---|
| 1 | Albion State Bank | | December 11, 1979 (#79002024) | Off U.S. Route 271; 34°39′48″N 95°05′59″W | Albion | Demolished |
| 2 | Antlers Frisco Depot and Antlers Spring | Antlers Frisco Depot and Antlers Spring | June 27, 1980 (#80003298) | 119 W. Main St. 34°13′51″N 95°37′17″W | Antlers | |
| 3 | James Martin Baggs Log Barn | | September 8, 2015 (#15000579) | W. side of Cty. Rd. N4480; 34°24′11″N 95°03′52″W | Pickens | geocoordinates are approximate. |
| 4 | Clayton High School-Auditorium | Clayton High School-Auditorium | September 8, 1988 (#88001418) | W. Pine St. 34°35′22″N 95°21′16″W | Clayton | |
| 5 | Fewell School | | September 8, 1988 (#88001419) | Off State Highway 144; 34°31′18″N 95°02′33″W | Nashoba | |
| 6 | Frisco Railroad Depot | | July 10, 2024 (#100010524) | NW corner, intersection of Pine Street and Depot Road; 34°35′17″N 95°21′08″W | Clayton | |
| 7 | Mato Kosyk House | | December 11, 1979 (#79002025) | East of Albion off U.S. Route 271; 34°40′33″N 95°07′24″W | Albion | |
| 8 | Snow School | Snow School | September 8, 1988 (#88001420) | U.S. Route 271; 34°23′48″N 95°24′45″W | Snow | |
| 9 | Choctaw Capitol Building | Choctaw Capitol Building | July 28, 1970 (#70000537) | 163665 N. 4355 Rd. 34°38′30″N 95°16′43″W | Tuskahoma | |

== See also ==
- List of National Historic Landmarks in Oklahoma
- National Register of Historic Places listings in Oklahoma
