= Tuskahoma, Oklahoma =

Tuskahoma Tushka Homma (Choctaw)
- Unincorporated community and census-designated place
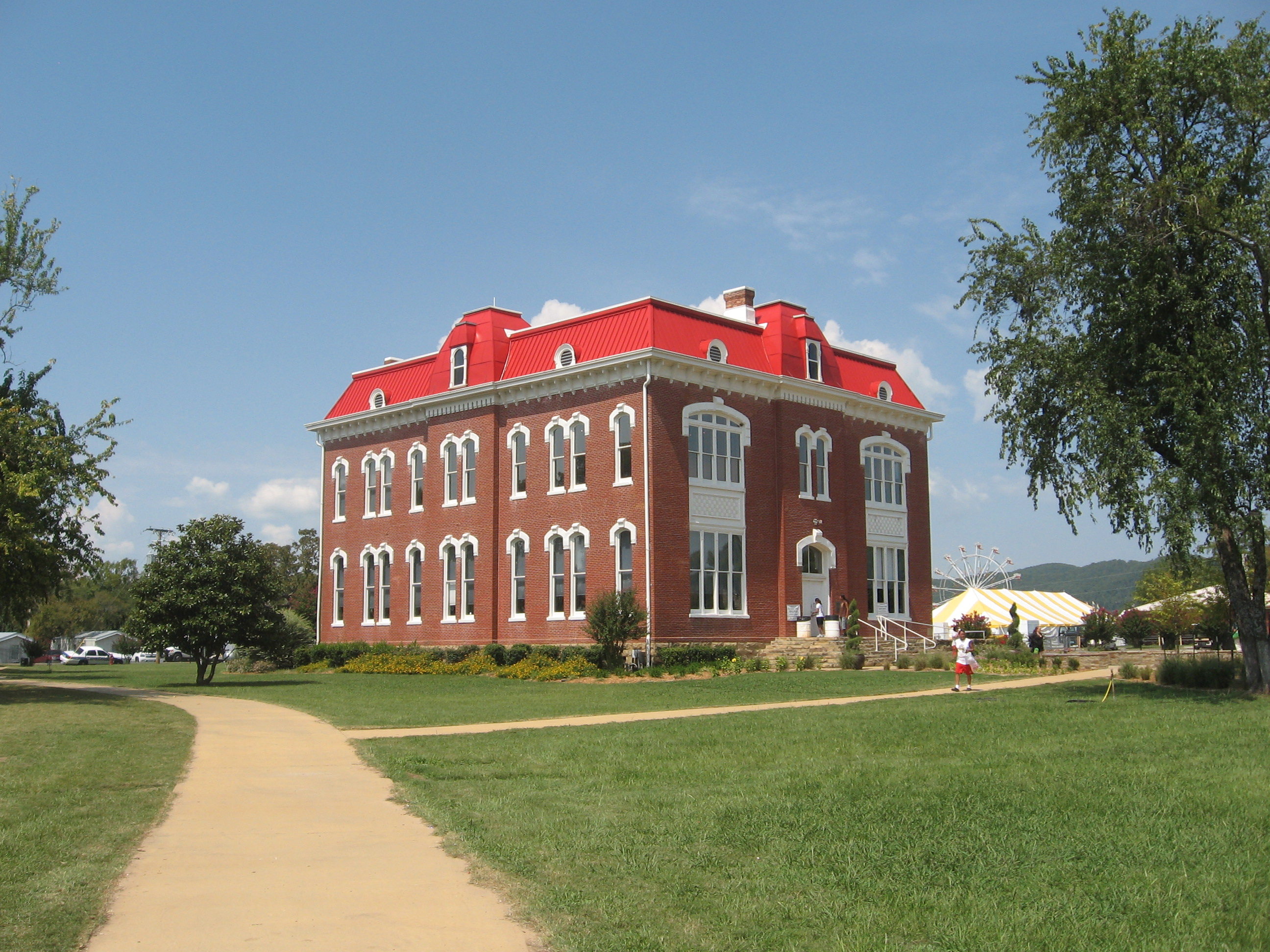
- Choctaw Capitol Building in Tuskahoma, Oklahoma, September 22, 2009
- Motto: The Red Warrior
- Location in the state of Oklahoma Tuskahoma (the United States)
- Coordinates: 34°37′04″N 95°16′34″W
- Country: United States
- State: Oklahoma
- County: Pushmataha

Area
  - Total: 2.29 sq mi (5.92 km^{2})
  - Land: 2.26 sq mi (5.86 km^{2})
  - Water: 0.027 sq mi (0.07 km^{2})
- Elevation: 659 ft (201 m)

Population (2020)
  - Total: 102
  - Density: 45.1/sq mi (17.41/km^{2})
- Time zone: UTC-6 (Central (CST))
  - Summer (DST): UTC-5 (CDT)
- ZIP code: 74574
- FIPS code: 40-75300
- GNIS feature ID: 2629939

Tuskahoma is an unincorporated community and census-designated place in northern Pushmataha County, Oklahoma, United States, four miles east of Clayton. It was the former seat of the Choctaw Nation government prior to Oklahoma statehood. The population was 102 as of the 2020 United States census.

== History ==
A United States Post Office was established at Tushka Homma, Indian Territory on February 27, 1885. On October 28, 1891, the spelling changed to Tushkahomma. On December 6, 1910 the official spelling changed to its present rendering, Tuskahoma. The community has also been served by post office locations at nearby Council House (1872–1880) and Lyceum (1896–1900). Council House was at the Choctaw Capitol Building and Lyceum was at the former Tuskahoma Female Academy.

Tuskahoma is a compound word meaning 'red warrior' in the Choctaw language. The spelling was originally rendered as Tvshka Homma in an 1852 Choctaw-English dictionary published by a missionary, the Rev. Cyrus Byington. The apparent lower-case "v" is actually a Greek letter, upsilon, which represents what Byington described as a "u short" sound. In recent years, the Choctaw Nation's official publications have switched to this spelling.

Tuskahoma was designated as (political) capital of the Choctaw Nation in 1882 when an Act of the Choctaw Nation dated October 20, 1882, established the community as the permanent seat of government. The nation's first capital after the Trail of Tears was at Nanih [Nunih] Waiyah, two miles east of Tuskahoma. It was named after Nunih Waiyah, a sacred mound in Mississippi where the Choctaw brought the bones of their ancestors to rest and established the tribe. The mound was built by an earlier people, but it became sacred to the Choctaw as well. Later, during a period of constitutional experimentation, the Choctaw shifted their capital from Nanih Waiyah to Doaksville, Skullyville, Fort Towson and Boggy Depot. The Choctaw wartime capital during the Civil War was at Armstrong Academy, also known as Chahta Tamaha.

After the Choctaw Nation decided to make Tuskahoma the permanent capital, it constructed an appropriate building to house the government. A spacious Choctaw Capitol Building was completed in the fall of 1884. It was two stories, brick, with a garret under its French mansard roof. Many called it the finest building in the Indian Territory. It included large rooms for the Senate, House of Representatives, and Supreme Court. Also included were an Executive Office for the Principal Chief, or Governor, of the Choctaw Nation, five smaller rooms for the national officers, and five committee rooms. It was heated by numerous fireplaces.

Almost immediately, a bustling town sprang up by the capitol building. Several hotels, boarding houses, barber shops, stores, blacksmith shop, photographer's tent, and homes were built. But when the St. Louis and San Francisco Railway built its tracks through the Kiamichi River valley in the mid-1880s, they ran two miles to the south of the capitol. Business flocked to the vicinity of the new Tuskahoma railroad station and the Capitol precinct was abandoned, except during sessions of the government.

This twist of history altered Tuskahoma's prominence. The Choctaw Nation constitution directed the constitutional officers, such as Principal Chief, National Secretary, National Treasurer, National Auditor and National Attorney to reside "at or near the seat of government", but this provision was never enforced. During the National Council's first session in its new capitol, the principal chief of the day, J.F. McCurtain, proposed building five homes on the site to accommodate the national officers, but this was never done.

In addition to serving as a government center, Tuskahoma was also intended to be a cultural center and was the location of the Choctaw Nation's national girls' school. Tuskahoma Female Academy [or Institute] opened in 1892 at nearby Lyceum, with Peter J. Hudson serving as superintendent. The academy, also known as the Choctaw Female Academy, occupied a classical-style two-story colonnaded building. It burned in 1925 and was not rebuilt. [Noted Choctaw educator Anna Lewis, who had attended the school, bought the site and used materials from the ruins to build her family home, which she called Nunih Waiyah.] From that time forward, Tuskahoma's role as a center of education ceased.

Tuskahoma's new site along the railroad prospered, and became a vibrant community and trading center. Banks, hotels, stores, churches, a school, and numerous homes lined its commercial district and residential streets. Its importance began to wane during the middle and later years of the 20th century, as commerce shifted to nearby Clayton or elsewhere, following the construction of highways and shifting of transport off the railroads.

Prior to Oklahoma's statehood, Tuskahoma and the Choctaw Capitol Building were in Wade County, Choctaw Nation. More information on Tuskahoma may be found in the Pushmataha County Historical Society.

== Geography ==
Local transportation was revolutionized during the 1950s by the construction of U.S. Highway 271, which provided paved all-weather highway connections to Clayton and the county seat at Antlers to the east and south, and Talihina, Wilburton and Poteau to the northeast.

The Kiamichi River, important as a source of water, is not navigable at Tuskahoma and has never played a role in local transportation. It did, however, cause the St. Louis and San Francisco Railway to place its station at Tuskahoma's present location, due to the trains’ need for a reliable water supply, rather than its original location at the Capitol.

The Kiamichi Mountains define life in the Tuskahoma region, which is one of Oklahoma's most scenic areas. The Kiamichi River valley stretches to the east and west of the community. To the north lie the unusually serrated Potato Hills, with peaks topping out at approximately 1,000 feet in elevation. To the south is a scenic but imposing mountain wilderness, with summits topping off at approximately 1,600 feet in elevation. Here, roads do not penetrate and all transportation is via unimproved timber company roads, including Clayton Trail, Hurd Creek Trail, K Trail, Cripple Mountain Trail and Black Fork Trail.

Unusual and striking geological features abound in the Tuskahoma region. Its valley—one of the prettiest in Oklahoma—is of special note. The Potato Hills, a group of tall outcroppings eroded from prehistoric mountains, are a regional landmark. To the north of Tuskahoma lies McKinley Rocks, a series of massive white boulders seemingly strewn across the top of a mountain. Access is difficult, causing a WPA survey crew to recommend during the 1930s that the site, while abounding in scenic beauty, should not become a state park due to lack of roads. The rocks, which afford views for miles in any direction, were first noted by a Choctaw survey party during the late 1890s. They are named in honor of the 26th President of the United States, William McKinley.

== Demographics ==
Historical population
Census	Pop.	Note	%±
2020	102		—
U.S. Decennial Census

=== 2020 census ===
As of the 2020 census, Tuskahoma had a population of 102. The median age was 40.5 years. 27.5% of residents were under the age of 18 and 33.3% of residents were 65 years of age or older. For every 100 females there were 104.0 males, and for every 100 females age 18 and over there were 131.2 males age 18 and over.

0.0% of residents lived in urban areas, while 100.0% lived in rural areas.

There were 40 households in Tuskahoma, of which 32.5% had children under the age of 18 living in them. Of all households, 37.5% were married-couple households, 35.0% were households with a male householder and no spouse or partner present, and 12.5% were households with a female householder and no spouse or partner present. About 40.0% of all households were made up of individuals and 15.0% had someone living alone who was 65 years of age or older.

There were 52 housing units, of which 23.1% were vacant. The homeowner vacancy rate was 0.0% and the rental vacancy rate was 66.7%.

Racial composition as of the 2020 census
Race	Number	Percent
White	73	71.6%
Black or African American	0	0.0%
American Indian and Alaska Native	11	10.8%
Asian	0	0.0%
Native Hawaiian and Other Pacific Islander	0	0.0%
Some other race	1	1.0%
Two or more races	17	16.7%
Hispanic or Latino (of any race)	1	1.0%

== Choctaw Nation Labor Day Festival ==
The Choctaw Nation of Oklahoma holds its annual Labor Day Festival (pow-wow) in Tuskahoma on the grounds of the Capitol building. Attendance ranges from 50,000 - 100,000 over the course of the festival, people coming from all corners of the United States. The festival features various events from country and gospel music concerts to softball games, and pow-wows, arts and crafts, basketball games, strength contests, a carnival, animal shows, horseshoe games, bison tours, volleyball games, a swimming pool, tent and RV grounds, a 5K run, playgrounds, a museum, and numerous other events.

During recent years the Choctaw Capitol Building has been recognized as an architecturally and historically significant structure, and has been added to the National Register of Historic Places listings in Pushmataha County, Oklahoma. It hosts the Choctaw Nation Labor Day Festival and provides the centerpiece for the festivities.

== Climate ==
Climate data for Tuskahoma, Oklahoma. (Elevation 600ft)
Month	Jan	Feb	Mar	Apr	May	Jun	Jul	Aug	Sep	Oct	Nov	Dec	Year
Record high °F (°C)	78 (26)	87 (31)	93 (34)	96 (36)	97 (36)	107 (42)	112 (44)	114 (46)	112 (44)	101 (38)	87 (31)	80 (27)	114 (46)
Mean daily maximum °F (°C)	53.1 (11.7)	58.2 (14.6)	67.2 (19.6)	75.2 (24.0)	81.3 (27.4)	88.7 (31.5)	94.6 (34.8)	95.0 (35.0)	87.3 (30.7)	77.0 (25.0)	64.4 (18.0)	55.0 (12.8)	74.8 (23.8)
Mean daily minimum °F (°C)	29.1 (−1.6)	33.1 (0.6)	41.7 (5.4)	49.7 (9.8)	58.5 (14.7)	66.5 (19.2)	70.1 (21.2)	69.1 (20.6)	61.9 (16.6)	50.5 (10.3)	40.7 (4.8)	31.7 (−0.2)	50.2 (10.1)
Record low °F (°C)	−13 (−25)	−4 (−20)	5 (−15)	21 (−6)	32 (0)	40 (4)	47 (8)	47 (8)	32 (0)	18 (−8)	7 (−14)	−10 (−23)	−13 (−25)
Average precipitation inches (mm)	2.94 (75)	2.97 (75)	3.68 (93)	5.10 (130)	5.95 (151)	4.89 (124)	3.38 (86)	2.92 (74)	4.40 (112)	4.45 (113)	4.02 (102)	3.32 (84)	48.02 (1,220)
Average snowfall inches (cm)	1.7 (4.3)	1.3 (3.3)	0.4 (1.0)	0 (0)	0 (0)	0 (0)	0 (0)	0 (0)	0 (0)	0 (0)	0.1 (0.25)	0.4 (1.0)	4.0 (10)
Source: The Western Regional Climate Center
