= Pushmataha County Historical Society =

Coordinates: 34°13′50.72″N 95°37′17.24″W

The Pushmataha County Historical Society is a historical society devoted to collecting and preserving the history of Pushmataha County, Oklahoma, United States. It is headquartered in the historic Frisco Depot in Antlers, Oklahoma, which it operates as a public museum.

== Origin of the society ==
Although Pushmataha County was created on November 16, 1907 – the day of Oklahoma’s statehood – no historical society was established for almost 80 years. On January 20, 1984 a group interested in preserving the history of the county met at the Diamond Steak House in Antlers to found a historical society. At this meeting the following offices were established and the following officers elected: Carl Wood, president; Dorothy Arnote West, vice president; Jimi Moyer Cocke, treasurer; and Anne Halley Smallwood, secretary. John Cocke and Mary Olive Wood were elected as directors.

The organization’s first meeting was held on April 10, 1984 at which a constitution and by-laws were adopted. Incorporation as a not-for-profit entity had already been established.

A general membership drive began at once, and proved successful.

== Mission and Accomplishments ==
The first major goal of the historical society was to obtain, and preserve, the historic Antlers Frisco Depot and Antlers Spring. Built by the St. Louis and San Francisco Railroad, also called the Frisco, in 1913, it had fallen into disrepair and general disuse. The Frisco had ended passenger operations in 1958 and in 1981 it ended all remaining freight operations. At that time the railroad track and trestle bridges north of Antlers were removed. Track south of Antlers continued in operation for purposes of hauling pulpwood, which was loaded onto rail cars at the Antlers Depot until 1999, when a loading facility was built just south of town.

Burlington Northern Railroad—the successor to the Frisco Railroad—gave the depot to the new Pushmataha County Historical Society in June 1985. Efforts began immediately to stabilize the building and restore it. A new roof, some new window glass, electrical wiring and a furnace and air conditioning system were installed. Much of the labor was donated by area residents.

A second major initiative was identifying and inventorying all cemeteries in Pushmataha County. Many cemeteries both large and small were found, and each grave was carefully listed. As a companion effort the burial records of the local funeral home, Mills-Coffey Funeral Home, were used to accomplish as complete an inventory for each burial site as possible. This effort culminated in the publication of a book in 1988, Pushmataha County Cemeteries—Old and New.

As part of the cemetery identification project almost 12,000 burials and grave sites were inventoried at approximately 119 locations. Several volunteers completed this mammoth project, including co-chairmen Jerry Miller and Everett Helm, assisted by Allan Birdsell, Kay Black, Kenneth and Myrtle Edmond, Christine Ives, Marjorie Rember, and others.

== Current status ==
Since acquiring the Antlers Frisco Depot and Antlers Spring the Pushmataha County Historical Society has placed historical exhibits on public display as well as established a research library. Volunteers staff the facility throughout the week. The Depot itself is an artifact from an earlier time—the interior is divided into separate waiting rooms for white people and black people, with separate sets of toilets—allowing the society to educate visitors about the effect that lack of equal rights and racial equality had on both architecture and social customs.

Ownership of the Depot has been contested recently. Originally given by Burlington Northern to the historical society, the society appears to have deeded it inadvertently to the City of Antlers as part of a legal process intended to accomplish other objectives. The city now maintains the Depot, relieving the society of the responsibility. In exchange, however, the city placed the Pushmataha County Chamber of Commerce in a portion of the facility originally used for historical exhibits, where it remained for several years before relocating.

No official projects are currently underway, nor does the society have a publications program, although the society remains active in opening the facility throughout the week, giving tours, and conducting research on behalf of the public. In addition, individual members are or have recently contributed to the historical legacy through a variety of methods.

== Recent and ongoing projects ==
In 2002 society member Dorothy Arnote West, then almost 100 years old, published the landmark Pushmataha—The Early Years. This book chronicled the origin and development of Pushmataha County through the 1930s. Ms. West—an original Choctaw Indian allottee— was a gifted writer and trained journalist who collected historical information for decades before compiling and publishing it. Born in 1902 in Antlers, Indian Territory—when it was a part of Jack’s Fork County in the Choctaw Nation—she was an active witness to the county’s history until her death March 22, 2010.

Kay Black, another society member, has been active in compiling vital records from a variety of sources. The results of her research are not published formally, but have been released as painstakingly detailed unpublished books. Because the county court house burned during the Great Depression, Ms. Black has used primary historical sources, such as newspapers, to compile much of the data. She has also used census data generated by the former Choctaw Nation of Indian Territory, and afterward by the U.S. Government.

Another society member is currently working on a multi-year effort to index the county’s newspapers. Numerous newspaper titles have been published since 1900, when the county was still a part of the Indian Territory, through the present. Many of these newspapers will not digitize well due to their deteriorated condition at time of microfilming, and may never be satisfactorily searched via the Internet. They will require “human agency” to read each and make note of significant data.

== Historical collection ==
The Antlers Depot is one of the county’s most historic buildings. Its large, airy rooms lend themselves well to their present purpose as a history museum. The Depot contains both artifacts and information.

Artifacts

Many three-dimensional pieces, or artifacts, held by the historical society provide insight into Pushmataha County’s origins as a territorial and farming community.

One particularly unique piece is a large-sized wall map of the county published in the early years of the Twentieth Century. It shows many locales—school sites; sawmill villages; and train stations—which have disappeared entirely. The map came from the office of the county superintendent of education, an office which no longer exists.

Other pieces illustrate education and schools, farming, and other accouterments of daily life in Pushmataha County and its communities.

Research Library

The research library includes all the county newspapers on microfilm, as well as copies of census data. The first extant newspaper title published in what is now Pushmataha County is dated January 1900. The record extends unbroken from that year through the present via several newspaper titles published in Antlers, Albion, Clayton and Tuskahoma.

In addition the library includes a print collection of books and other information, including unpublished manuscripts. One set of manuscripts are printouts of relevant interviews conducted of county pioneers in the 1930s and assembled as the Indian-Pioneer Papers. Over 60 interviews are represented.

The collection also includes many photographs, some dating from territorial times, charting the settlement and establishment of civilization and society in the county.

== Related historical collections and sites ==
Another museum in Pushmataha County not affiliated or allied with the county historical society is that of the Choctaw Nation, located in the Choctaw Capitol Building in Tuskahoma, Oklahoma. The building now serves as the National Museum, and features historical exhibits and other information.

The Pushmataha County Historical Society Collection, held by the Western History Collections of the University of Oklahoma Libraries, contains many copies of the society’s photographs. These have been indexed and cataloged, and some have been made available online.

An unusual and interesting historical marker, or monument, is located on top of Big Mountain, north of Moyers, Oklahoma and west of Kosoma, Oklahoma. Formally called the AT6 Monument, it marks the location of a fatal airplane crash during World War II which killed Royal Air Force pilots sent to the U.S. for training by the British Government.

The crash occurred during stormy weather and involved two fighter planes—the other impact site is located on White Rock Mountain above Moyers; no marker has been erected there. The AT6 Memorial was dedicated on February 21, 2000 by the school children of Rattan, Oklahoma, in the presence of over 1,000 people. Visitors included many from the United Kingdom, as well as the official air attaches from the embassies of the United Kingdom and New Zealand in Washington, D.C., and the British Vice Consul from the country’s consulate in Houston, Texas.

While not a formal project of the historical society, many society members assisted the school children by aiding with the logistics necessary in carrying out the dedication ceremony and reception afterward, generating worldwide publicity. Wire services around the world carried the story, as did the British Broadcasting Corporation, American television and radio outlets, and many state and local newspapers, all of which sent reporters to cover the event.

The AT6 Monument stands in a grove of pine trees aside a large boulder which the wrecked plane struck and turned upright—almost as a natural tombstone, as local residents sent to investigate the crash noted.

== NRHP sites ==
The following sites in Pushmataha County are listed on the National Register of Historic Places:

- Albion State Bank, Albion
- Antlers Frisco Depot and Antlers Spring, Antlers
- Choctaw Capitol Building, Tuskahoma
- Clayton High School Auditorium, Clayton
- Fewell School, Nashoba
- Mato Kosyk House, Albion
- Snow School, Snow
