= Choctaw Capitol Building =

Historic building in Tuskahoma, Oklahoma, United States

- Tuskahoma
- U.S. National Register of Historic Places
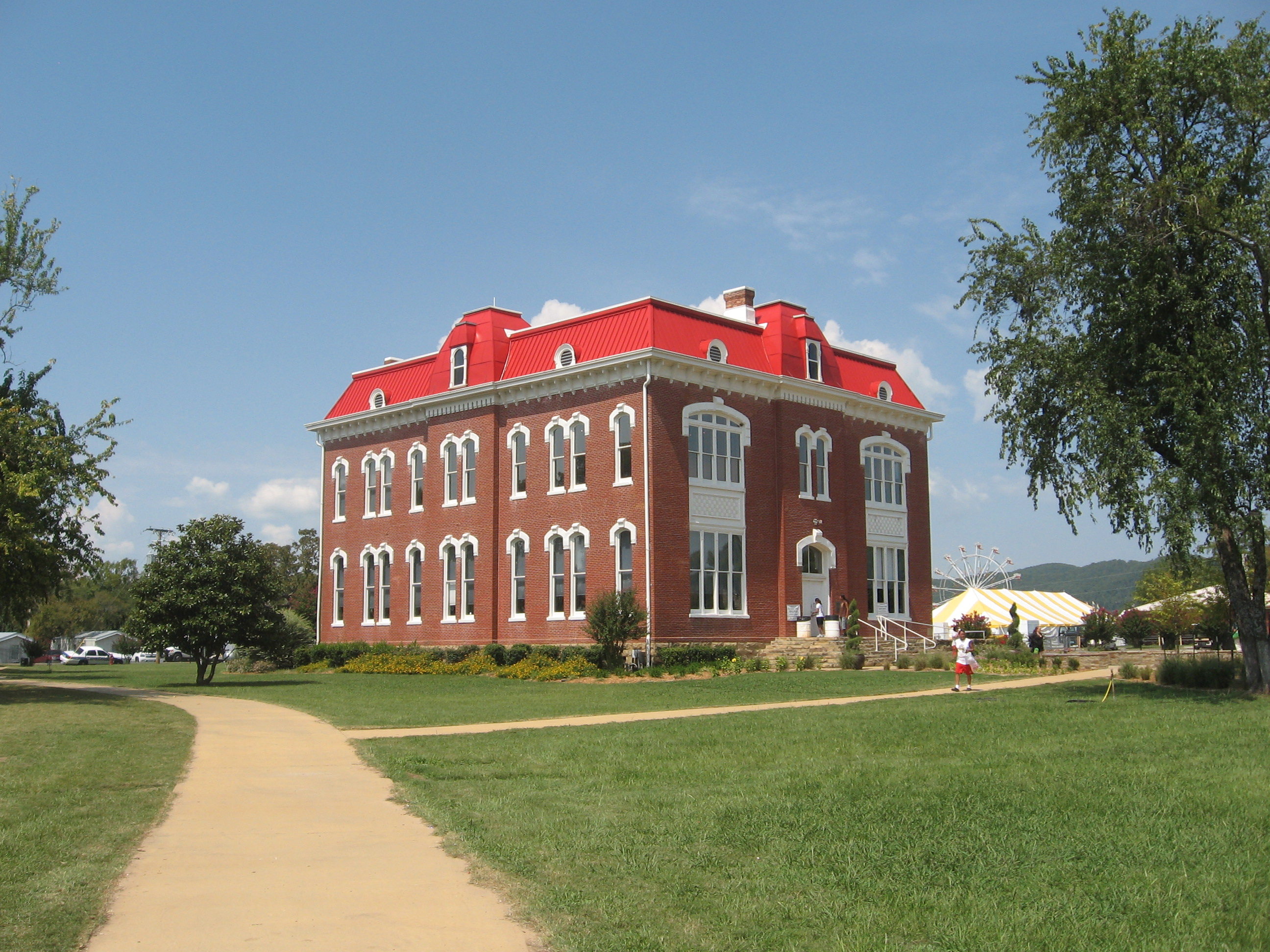
- Location: 163655 N. 4355 Rd., Tuskahoma, Oklahoma
- Coordinates: 34°38′30″N 95°16′43″W
- Built: 1884
- Architectural style: Second Empire
- NRHP reference No.: 70000537
- Added to NRHP: 1970

The Choctaw Capitol Building (Choctaw: Chuka Hanta Chahta; also known as Tuskahoma – Choctaw Council House, or simply as Tuskahoma,) is a historic building built in 1884 that housed the government of the Choctaw Nation of Oklahoma from 1884 to 1907. The building is located in Pushmataha County, Oklahoma, two miles north of the community of Tuskahoma.

== History ==
A United States Post Office operated here as Council House, Indian Territory from February 6, 1872, to June 30, 1880. Postal operations were later carried on at nearby Lyceum, site of the Choctaw girls’ academy, and Tuskahoma. During the days of the Indian Territory the Council House was located in Wade County, Choctaw Nation. After several decades of constitutional experimentation, during which the Choctaw Indians moved their national capital among several locations, the National Council in 1883 authorized construction of a permanent seat of government at Tushka Homma. The name means “home of the red warrior” in the Choctaw language, and its spelling has since been standardized as Tuskahoma.

The Capitol was completed in September 1884, built of red native brick, sandstone, and nearby timber for $30,000. It is 72'-11" long by 62'-4" feet wide, and stands 54'-2" tall to the chimneys. It consists of two stories and a mansard roof attic. In the fall of 1884 the Indian Journal at Muskogee, Indian Territory wrote, “The capitol building is the finest structure in the Territory…”

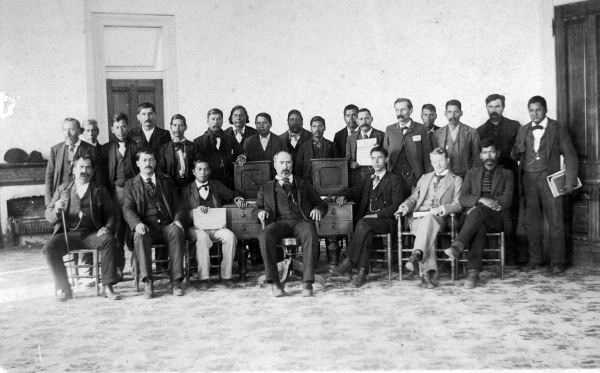
Senate of the Choctaw Nation, at the Choctaw Capitol Building in Tuskahoma, 1898.

Inside the Capitol were rooms for the Senate, House of Representatives, Principal Chief, Supreme Court, and constitutional officers, including the National Attorney and National Auditor.

The Capitol was in use from 1884 until 1907, when the Choctaw Nation was abolished and Oklahoma became a state. After annexation and statehood, the building fell into disuse and disrepair. Jane Austin McCurtain was appointed as custodian of the Council House, and served until her death in 1924.

== Present Day ==
The Capitol has achieved new life as the national museum of the successfully reconstituted Choctaw Nation, whose executive offices are now located in Durant, Oklahoma. The Choctaw Nation holds its annual Labor Day festival there, which attracts nationally known country-western singers and bands, and draws in excess of 100,000 attendees.

A Choctaw war veterans' memorial is on the Capitol grounds. It includes a special section in tribute to the famous Choctaw Code Talkers, who pioneered the use of Native American languages as military code. Their initial exploits were during World War I, and were repeated by Choctaws and additional tribes during World War II.

In May 2017, the tribe unveiled a Ten Commandments monument, inscribed in both Choctaw and English, on the Capitol grounds.

The Capitol is listed on the National Register of Historic Places listings in Pushmataha County, Oklahoma. More information on the Capitol, Tuskahoma and the Choctaw Nation may be found in the Pushmataha County Historical Society.
