= Antlers Municipal Airport =

Airport in Oklahoma, United States

- IATA: ATE; ICAO: none; FAA LID: 80F

Summary
- Airport type: Public
- Owner: City of Antlers
- Serves: Antlers, Oklahoma
- Elevation AMSL: 577 ft (176 m)
- Coordinates: 34°11′33″N 095°38′59″W
- Interactive map of Antlers Municipal Airport

Runways
Direction	Length		Surface
Direction	ft	m	Surface
17/35	4,001	1,220	Asphalt

Statistics (2018)
- Aircraft operations (year ending 8/7/2018): 2,300
- Source: Federal Aviation Administration

Antlers Municipal Airport (IATA: ATE, FAA LID: 80F) is a public airport one mile (1.6 km) southwest of the central business district of Antlers, a city in Pushmataha County, Oklahoma, United States. It is owned by the City of Antlers.

== Facilities and aircraft ==
Antlers Municipal Airport covers an area of 97 acres (39 ha) which contains one asphalt paved runway (17/35) measuring 4,001 ft × 60 ft (1,220 m × 18 m). For the 12-month period ending August 7, 2018, the airport had 2,300 aircraft operations, all of which were general aviation.

== See also ==
- List of airports in Oklahoma
