= Antlers Frisco Depot and Antlers Spring =

Historic place in Oklahoma, United States

- U.S. National Register of Historic Places
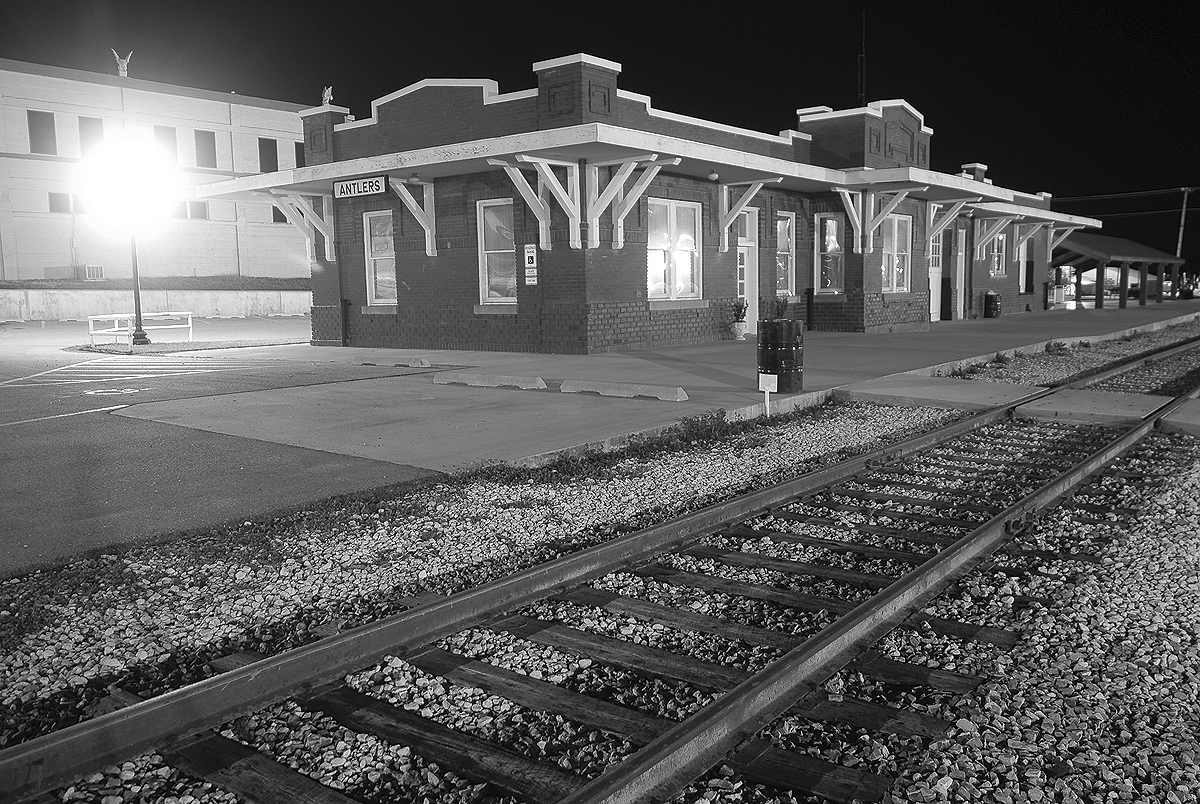

- Location within Oklahoma Location within the United States
- Location: 119 W. Main St., Antlers, Oklahoma
- Coordinates: 34.2307°N 95.6214°W
- Area: 2.5 acres (1.0 ha)
- Built: 1911
- NRHP reference No.: 80003298
- Added to NRHP: June 27, 1980

The Frisco Depot and adjacent Antlers Spring are historic sites in Antlers, Oklahoma, United States. The sites are a part of the National Register of Historic Places, in which they appear as a single entry.

== Establishing the Railroad ==
Antlers owes its existence to the St. Louis and San Francisco Railroad—also known as the Frisco Railroad—which opened in June 1887. The railroad, which was built north to south through the mountains and virgin timberlands of the Choctaw Nation of the Indian Territory, brought civilization to the wilderness—three passenger trains operated daily in each direction, plus two freight trains, making for a total of ten trains per day.

To support this industrial infrastructure section houses were established by the railroad every few miles. The houses assumed responsibility for maintaining the railroad track and right-of-way in either direction of each location.

A section house was established at the site of present-day Antlers, with adjacent station stops to the north at Davenport, Indian Territory—now Kellond, Oklahoma—and south at Hamden, Indian Territory—now Hamden, Oklahoma. Railroad officials chose Antlers as the site due to the presence of a well-watered spring of fresh water. Surrounding the spring were numerous pairs of deer antlers nailed to trees. The antlers had been placed there by hunters as hunting trophies, and constituted a local landmark. The station, originally called Beaver Station after nearby Beaver Creek, was soon renamed Antlers.

Antlers, Indian Territory quickly became a bustling territorial town and was provided with a wooden railroad station. The downtown business district was wooden, too, and much of it went up in flames during a catastrophic conflagration in 1904. Town officials afterward passed an ordinance requiring fireproof buildings made of brick, stone or cement throughout the town limits. This ordinance prevented the Frisco Railroad from replacing the depot with a stucco building such as had just been built (and still exists) in Hugo, Indian Territory.

In March 1913 the railroad company announced it would build a brick building east of the tracks. The first stakes went into the ground two months later and, on June 5, 1914, the new depot opened for business. The depot quickly became the most important building in the community. Crowds routinely greeted each arriving passenger train, from which many townspeople embarked and disembarked, and businessmen greeted the freight trains, which delivered or received produce and goods for sale or shipment. The depot was, quite simply, the busiest building in the county—for decades.

On February 1, 1958, the end of an era dawned as the Frisco Railroad ended passenger service. This coincided with the development and paving of area highways, made necessary by the increasing use of the personal automobile. Freight service continued until February 1981, when the Burlington Northern Railroad—which had since purchased the Frisco Railroad—closed and abandoned all railroad track, trestles and right-of-way north of Antlers. South of the town the track remained in place and pulpwood continued being loaded onto railroad cars at the Antlers Depot for shipment southbound. This continued until 1990, when a new loading facility was built just south of Antlers.

The Pushmataha County Historical Society was established in 1984 and its first major project was an initiative to obtain the abandoned Antlers depot and restore and preserve it as a county museum. On June 1, 1985, U.S. Senator Don Nickles announced that Burlington Northern agreed to donate the depot to the historical society. The transfer of title soon took place and the historical society set about its mission.

== The Depot Building ==
Constructed in a vaguely Italianate style, the depot is low, long and symmetrical, and measures 100 feet long by 30 feet wide. It consists of red brick with parapets topped by a concrete cap. The building is flat-roofed with a horizontal wooden canopy over the controller’s observation window.

Approximately half of its interior was devoted to passengers and half was devoted to storing or moving freight. The architecture of the building speaks to a different era, an era predating civil rights and racial equality. From north to south the building housed a waiting room for white passengers, with adjacent toilets, a ticket office, and a waiting room for Negro passengers, with adjacent toilets.

At the time the depot’s registration nomination was prepared for entry into the National Register of Historic Places in 1979, the building was empty except for the agent’s office. Ticket windows and desks made of walnut—original furnishings—were still in place, as was the train order board lever controls, which were still in use.

== Antlers Spring ==
Antlers Spring had not fared as well. It was enclosed in a concrete wall and roofed. It still flowed, but had deteriorated and had not been maintained. Nonetheless its historic nature was acknowledged, and it was included in the nomination. It was later accepted into the National Register along with the depot.

== Current status ==
Antlers Depot is home to the Pushmataha County Chamber of Commerce, which occupies the former waiting room for white passengers, and the Pushmataha County Historical Society, which occupies the former ticket office, Negro waiting room, and freight room.

Ownership of the building has recently been contested. The historical society contends that it received ownership outright from Burlington Northern in 1985, and labored solely to restore, preserve and operate the building until recent times. Somewhat more recently the City of Antlers has asserted its ownership, pointing to legal documents signed by historical society officers which, in part, transfer deed to the city.

Historical society officers acknowledge the validity of the city’s claim but say that a transfer of ownership occurred as part of the fine print on a lengthy legal document purporting to achieve other objectives.

“…Title to the Depot building was transferred to the city in an underhanded manner,” society officials wrote in a letter published in the town newspaper. “Transfer of title was never brought before our board or the membership of PCHS,” they continued. “The city of Antlers may have gotten legal title to the building but it has no moral title.”

Antlers’ city manager has since assumed responsibility for physical maintenance of the depot and, from 2009 until 2013, gave the chamber of commerce space within the facility for its operations. Despite the lingering differences of opinion regarding Depot ownership, the two groups cooperated very successfully in preserving and operating the Depot as a continuing public trust. The building once again serves solely as home of the historical society, and is open and staffed by historical society volunteers throughout the week.

Preceding station	St. Louis–San Francisco Railway	Following station
Hugo toward Paris	Paris – Monett	Poteau toward Monett
