= Clayton High School Auditorium =

- Clayton High School--Auditorium
- U.S. National Register of Historic Places
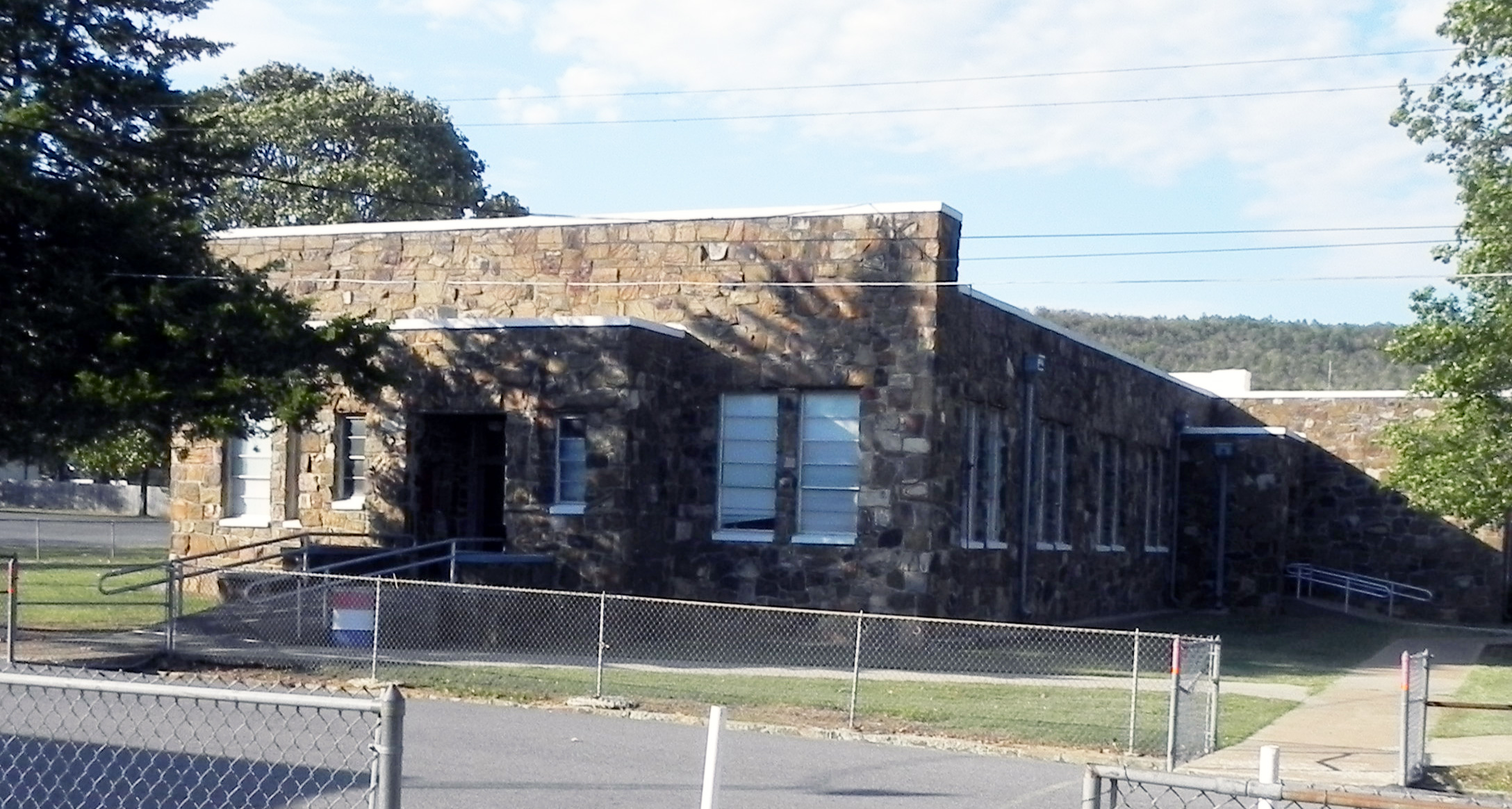
- Clayton high school auditorium

- Location within Oklahoma Location within the United States
- Location: West Pine Street; Clayton, Oklahoma
- Coordinates: 34°35′22″N 95°21′16″W
- Area: less than one acre
- Built: 1936
- Architectural style: Art Deco, Vernacular Art Deco
- MPS: WPA Public Bldgs., Recreational Facilities and Cemetery Improvements in Southeastern Oklahoma, 1935--1943 TR
- NRHP reference No.: 88001418
- Added to NRHP: September 08, 1988

Clayton High School Auditorium is an historic structure serving the public school of Clayton, Oklahoma. Clayton is located in the Kiamichi Mountains of Pushmataha County, Oklahoma.

The auditorium was constructed as a Works Progress Administration (WPA) public works project in 1936-1937, during the Great Depression. It provided much-needed jobs in the Clayton area, which had been economically ravaged.

According to an architectural survey completed in 1988, the auditorium is almost unique in being only one of two known WPA buildings constructed for sole use as auditoriums rather than as dual-use auditoriums and gymnasiums. (Much more common elsewhere in the county and Oklahoma was the dual-use auditorium and gymnasium, such as the WPA built elsewhere in the county in Antlers, Oklahoma, Moyers, Oklahoma and Rattan, Oklahoma.)

Art Deco was the prevalent architectural style during the 1930s, and the auditorium shows hints of it through its angular lines. The building is a single story T-shaped structure built of native untoled and uncoursed stone. According to the 1988 survey the stonework and masonry work are “excellent”.

The roof is flat with parapets capped with limestone blocks. Entryways are recessed, and windows are emplaced in groups of two. A drainage ditch dug by the WPA surrounds the building and, like the building, has been kept in excellent condition.

The building was nominated successfully to become part of the National Register of Historic Places in 1988. Justifying its inclusion was its unusual Art Deco allusions—uncommon among WPA buildings in the region—and its purpose as a sole-use auditorium.

More information on Clayton may be found in the Pushmataha County Historical Society.
