= Snow School =

- U.S. National Register of Historic Places
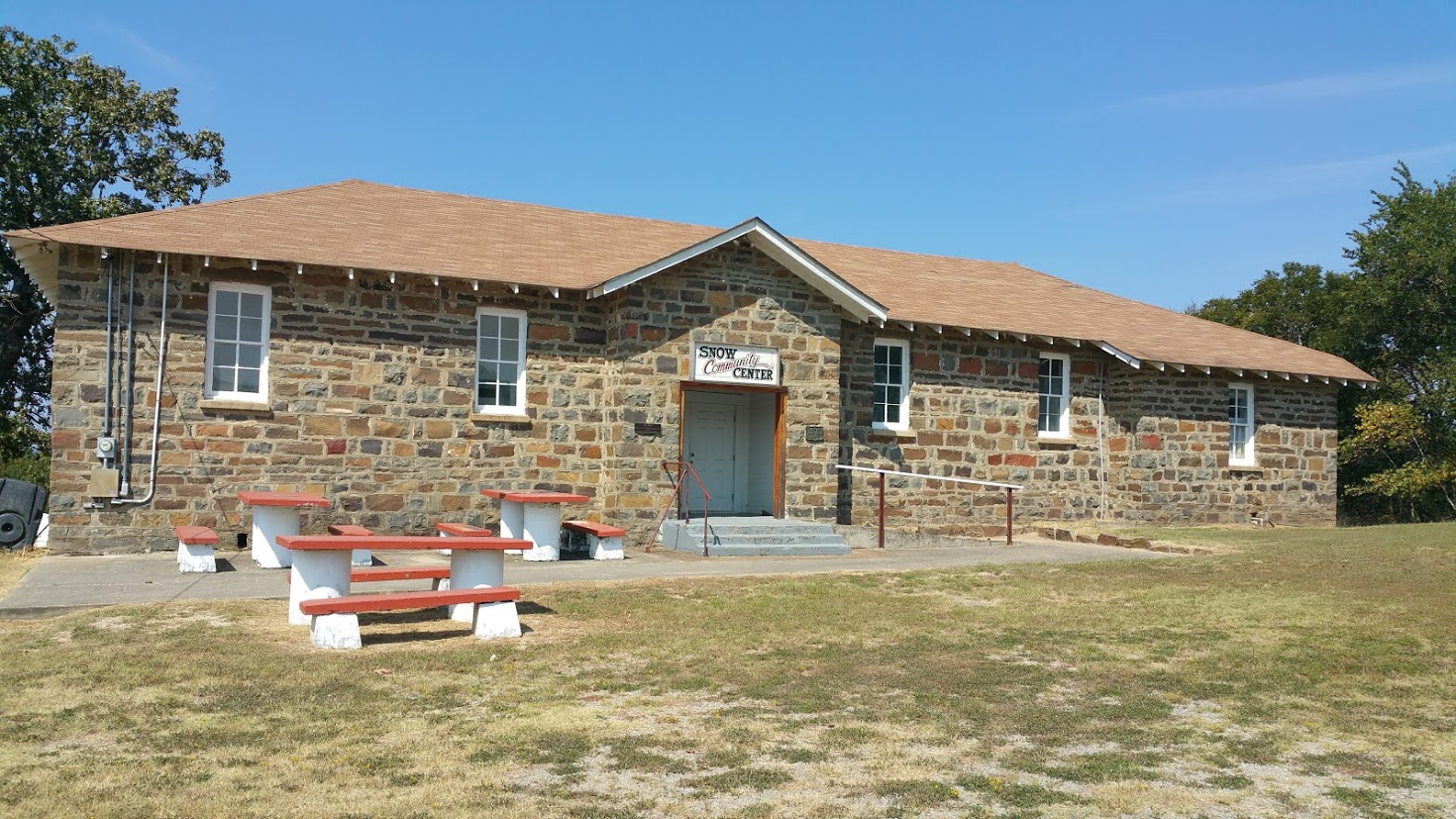

- Location within Oklahoma Location within the United States
- Location: US 271, Snow, Oklahoma
- Coordinates: 34°23′48″N 95°24′45″W
- Area: 1 acre (0.40 ha)
- Built: 1936
- Built by: Works Progress Administration
- Architect: Okla. State Dept. of Education
- MPS: WPA Public Bldgs., Recreational Facilities and Cemetery Improvements in Southeastern Oklahoma, 1935--1943 TR
- NRHP reference No.: 88001420
- Added to NRHP: September 8, 1988

Snow School is a historic school building in the rural community of Snow, Oklahoma, approximately 18 miles north of Antlers, Oklahoma. The school was added to the National Register of Historic Places in 1988.

== History ==
Snow was originally a small community located amid the timber lands of the Kiamichi Mountains. It possessed a school, stores, churches, and homes. During recent decades the school closed; its students are bused to public schools in Antlers.

Its school was maintained by the community, which also hired and provided a salary for its teacher. Teachers during the community's early days were not required to possess formal education degrees conferred by universities; some were only high school graduates.

== The school ==
Built from a pattern book created by the Oklahoma Department of Education, Snow School was initially a two-room structure. It was built of native sandstone and has a hipped roof (also called a hip roof) with a central gable—an unusual architectural feature in Pushmataha County. It was constructed during 1936-37 by local men. The Works Progress Administration, a Great Depression-era federal government agency, was responsible for its construction.

The WPA's school at Snow is one of several built in the county. Other notable WPA school buildings were built in Antlers, Clayton, Fewell, Kellond, Jumbo, Moyers, and Rattan. School buildings in Antlers and Clayton are also listed on the National Register of Historic Places.

More information on Snow may be found in the Pushmataha County Historical Society.
