= Snow, Oklahoma =

Unincorporated community in Oklahoma, US

Coordinates: 34°23′45″N 95°24′46″W

Snow is an unincorporated community in Pushmataha County, Oklahoma, United States, 18 miles northeast of Antlers.

A United States Post Office was established here on July 21, 1930 and was named for George Snow, local resident and merchant.

Located in the Kiamichi Mountains, Snow was very isolated until construction and paving of U.S. Highway 271 during the 1950s, connecting the area to Nashoba and Clayton to the north and Antlers to the south.

Snow is located along the upper reaches of Big Cedar Creek, which is almost always well watered and experiences reliable flow regardless of season.

Although Snow once supported a school, churches and more than one general store, it never developed into a commercial or trading center. Today, it no longer has a store but currently still has a post office. Its school children attend public school in Antlers.

During recent years, Snow School has been recognized as being of historical and architectural significance, and has been listed on the National Register of Historic Places.
