= Tuskahoma Female Academy =

Native American boarding school

Coordinates: 34.646°N 95.322°W

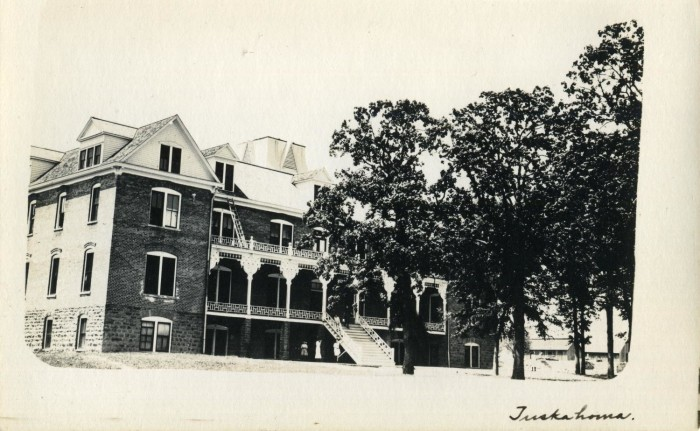
Photo of Tuskahoma Female Academy

Tuskahoma Female Academy (Tvska Homma Female Institute) (1892—1926), located near Tuskahoma, Oklahoma, was a boarding school for Choctaw girls aged 6—16.The school was established by an act of the Choctaw Nation on December 5, 1891 and operated by the Bureau of Indian Affairs (BIA). The school was organized as a response to a greater need for boarding schools at the time.

== School Conduct ==
The division of boys and girls academies in the Choctaw Nation boarding schools in part reflected the gender ideals of American motherhood as well as traditional Choctaw values as a matrilineal people. In a 1910 Report of The Department of the Interior Administrative Reports, a superintendent A. G. Gladley reported that girls were instructed in household labor skills such as cooking, sewing, laundry, household maintenance, and dressmaking.

The boarding school had a full scheduled regimen for their students consisting of rise and sleep times, mealtimes, school times, breaktimes as well as chapel activities. The schedules were adjusted often to reflect the ideals of the school sponsors. The Tuskahoma Female Academy hosted an activity or event for their students on Saturdays that of which reflected American Culture.

== Timeline ==
The school opened in fall, 1892. Choctaw Nation General Councilor, Peter J. Hudson was its original superintendent. Nellie Wakefield was the principal for the first 8 years it was in operation. Management of the school was taken over by the United States Department of the Interior in 1903. In 1920, Armstrong Academy, a historic choctaw school burned down and their students were book transferred to Tuskahoma female academy. The school was closed by Cato Sells, but reopened in 1923 after sitting vacant for two years. The school closed in 1926, after a fire destroyed the main buildings. Fires were a notable issue for Choctaw boarding schools. The property was auctioned off the next year. The 200 acres (81 ha) site was later purchased by Dr. Anna Lewis as a residence.

== See also ==
- American Indian boarding schools
- Carlisle Indian industrial school
