= Anna Lewis =

Native American teacher and historian (1885–1961)

- Anna Lewis as pictured in the 1926 Oklahoma College for Women yearbook
- Born: October 25, 1885; Choctaw Nation, Indian Territory
- Died: August 1, 1961 (aged 75); Pushmataha County, Oklahoma
- Occupations: Professor, historian, writer
- Years active: 1917–1956
- Known for: American History, History of the Southwest,
- Notable work: Along the Arkansas (1932), Pushmataha-the American Patriot (1962)

Anna Lewis (1885–1961) was a noted teacher, historian and writer, who specialized in American history, and particularly the history of the Southwest. A Choctaw Nation citizen born in what was then Indian Territory to a family of mixed Choctaw and European ancestry, she earned doctoral degrees from University of California, Berkeley (1915) and University of Oklahoma (1930). She was the first woman to receive a Ph. D. at the University of Oklahoma. Lewis spent her educational career at the Oklahoma College for Women (now the University of Science and Arts of Oklahoma (USAO)). She wrote two books and numerous articles for publications in her area of interest before retiring in 1956 to a home she had built in southern Oklahoma (the former Choctaw Nation before Oklahoma became a state). She died in 1961.

== Early life and education ==
Lewis was born on October 25, 1885, near the town of Cameron in the Choctaw Nation, Indian Territory. A citizen of the Choctaw Nation of Oklahoma, she was listed on the Dawes Rolls as 1/32nd Choctaw by Blood. Of mixed Choctaw and European ancestry, her parents were William Ainsworth Lewis and Betty Ann (née Moore). She was the fourth of ten children, three of whom died in childhood. She got her first education in what were known as "subscription schools" and from private teachers at home. Her higher education began at the Tuskahoma Female Institute in 1900. She then went to Mary Connor Junior College in Paris, Texas. She returned to Indian Territory and, after attending a summer at the normal school of Jones Academy, near Hartshorne, began a career as a teacher in the Bokchito and Durant public schools. After a few years, she enrolled in the University of California, Berkeley (UCB), earning a Bachelor of Arts degree in 1915. Continuing at UCB), she earned a Master of Arts degree in 1918 with the thesis, History of the Cattle Industry in Oklahoma, 1866-1893.

== Career ==
Like most of her contemporaries, Lewis found that most major colleges and universities were unwilling to hire women. In 1917, she joined the faculty of the Oklahoma College for Women (OCW) in Chickasha, Oklahoma, as a history teacher. She chose to remain there for the rest of her career.

By her second year at OCW, Lewis had been named the chair of the school's History Department. She also took on the position of school Registrar, to help President G. W. Austin organize that office. Dean James S. Buchanan of Oklahoma University helped her establish the system. Buchanan later became President of OU.

In her academic career, Lewis specialized in American history and the history of the Southwest, rapidly becoming well known as a teacher, lecturer and writer, as well as a popular after-dinner speaker. Although she wrote only two books, Along the Arkansas (1932) and Pushmataha-the American Patriot (1962). She frequently contributed articles to the Chronicles of Oklahoma, the Mississippi Valley Review, The University of California Press, and the Arkansas Historical Quarterly.

While continuing her career at OCW, she went to the University of Oklahoma in Norman, Oklahoma, and wrote her doctoral dissertation, A History of the Arkansas River Region, 1541–1800. She received her Ph.D. in 1930, becoming the first woman to be awarded a doctoral degree by Oklahoma University.

== Personal ==
Lewis built a home on the site of the defunct Tuskahoma Female Institute in Pushmataha County, Oklahoma. (Note: An undated news clipping describing the transfer of the former Tuskahoma Female Institute property to Anna Lewis is included in the collection of her papers (Series 6, Box 1) in Nash Library at the University of Science and Arts of Oklahoma, Chickasha, Oklahoma.) She named the house "Nunih Wayah", after the mountain where Choctaw legend says the tribe originated. She lived there full-time after retiring from OCW in 1956. Located 4 miles (6.4 km) from Tuskahoma and 6 miles (9.7 km) from Clayton, she died in her home on August 1, 1961.

== Honors ==
- Named one of the twenty-four most prominent women of Oklahoma in 1930.
- Listed in Who's Who (1932), Women in Who's Who, and Who's Who in Oklahoma.
- Elected to the Oklahoma Hall of Fame in 1940.
- Received a scholarship to the Peterborough Artist Colony in New Hampshire.
- Named Professor Emeritus after retiring from USAO in 1956.
- Posthumously inducted to Oklahoma Educator Hall of Fame in 1985.

== Organizations ==
She was a member or honorary member of many organizations such as the Baptist church, Daughters of the American Revolution, Eastern Star, Oyohoma (McAlester),

- American Association of University Women
- American Pen Women
- Delta Kappa Gamma
- Mississippi Historical Society
- Oklahoma Historical Society
