= Hamden, Oklahoma =

Unincorporated community in Oklahoma, US

- Unincorporated community
- Location within the state of Oklahoma Hamden (the United States)
- Coordinates: 34°08′32″N 95°34′00″W
- Country: United States
- State: Oklahoma
- County: Choctaw
- Time zone: UTC-6 (Central (CST))
  - Summer (DST): UTC-5 (CDT)
- GNIS feature ID: 1100472

Hamden is an unincorporated community in northern Choctaw County, Oklahoma, United States. It is seven miles southeast of Antlers.

A United States Post Office was established at Hamden, Indian Territory on March 31, 1894, and operated until May 15, 1924. Hamden is on the boundary separating Choctaw and Pushmataha counties, and residents of the community live in both.

During the 1880s the St. Louis-San Francisco Railway, more popularly known as the “Frisco”, built a line from north to south through the Choctaw Nation of the Indian Territory, connecting Fort Smith, Arkansas with Paris, Texas. Train stations were established every few miles to aid in opening up the land and, more particularly, to serve as the locations of section houses. Supervisors for their respective miles of track lived in the section houses to administer the track and its right-of-way. These stations also served as points at which the trains could draw water.

The site of Hamden was selected because of its proximity to a local creek. Adjacent station stops were established to the north and south.

The sparsely populated area, at that time known as Kiamitia County (Kiamichi County) of the Choctaw Nation, in the Indian Territory, was home to Choctaw Indians who farmed or subsisted on the land.

Few roads or trails existed. Transportation was provided by the Frisco Railroad, which offered six trains per day—three in each direction—until it closed to passenger traffic during the late 1950s. It continued freight operations until 1981, when it closed altogether.

Hamden, in its commercial heyday, boasted a cotton gin, store, school and churches, in addition to numerous homes. Residents continue to live in the area. The only local landmarks are a community center and the foundations of the old cotton gin, located near the railroad tracks and creek.
