= Fewell School =

- U.S. National Register of Historic Places
- Location within Oklahoma Location within the United States
- Nearest city: Nashoba, Oklahoma
- Coordinates: 34°31′18″N 95°02′35″W
- Area: 2 acres (0.81 ha)
- Built: 1936-1937
- Architect: Oklahoma State Dept. of Education
- Architectural style: Romanesque, vernacular Richardsonian Romanesque
- MPS: WPA Public Bldgs., Recreational Facilities and Cemetery Improvements in Southeastern Oklahoma, 1935--1943 TR
- NRHP reference No.: 88001419
- Added to NRHP: September 08, 1988

Fewell School is a historic site located in Fewell, Oklahoma. Fewell, 10 miles east of Nashoba, Oklahoma, is a rural community in the Kiamichi Mountains of Pushmataha County, Oklahoma.

Fewell School was constructed by the Works Progress Administration (WPA) in 1936-1937 as a Great Depression public works project. As built, the school consisted of three rooms and measured 28 by 42 feet (8.5 by 12.8 m). An extension measures 15 by 13 feet (4.6 by 4.0 m) feet and changed the building's formerly rectangular footprint to that of an "L" shape.

The school is constructed of uncoursed and undressed native sandstone. Beaded mortar sets the stones and, according to an architectural survey in 1988, is of "excellent" workmanship. It is roofed with sheet metal and the roof has intersecting gables. The front entryway, at the southeast corner, is behind double arches. Wood sash windows on concrete sills rise to the eaves.

At the time of the 1988 survey the building was found to be in good condition and was in use as a private residence—which the survey noted was an "excellent example of adaptive reuse".

Fewell School was examined in 1988 and nominated for inclusion on the National Register of Historic Places. Its nomination was successful.

Fewell is in the sparsely populated Little River (Oklahoma) valley, and is adjacent to the river. During the Great Depression the area experienced economic difficulty and the WPA construction project provided much-needed jobs.

More information on Fewell and the Little River valley may be found in the Pushmataha County Historical Society.
