= Albion State Bank =

- U.S. National Register of Historic Places
- Location within Oklahoma Location within the United States
- Location: Off U.S. 271; Albion, Oklahoma
- Coordinates: 34°39′48″N 95°5′59″W
- Area: less than one acre
- Built: 1910
- Architect: John T. Bailey
- NRHP reference No.: 79002024
- Added to NRHP: December 11, 1979

Albion State Bank was an historic structure in Albion, Oklahoma, located amidst the rugged and rural but verdant Kiamichi Mountains, in northeastern Pushmataha County, Oklahoma.

== History ==
The bank was built in the period of optimism immediately following Oklahoma's statehood on November 16, 1907. Settlers considered the county to be an agricultural paradise, and logging was an important industry in the Albion region. The town's railroad station was an active transshipment point for timber, and the town's early population grew rapidly.

Albion's future commercial success seemed assured to the town's businessmen, one of whom, John T. Bailey—who also named the town—built Albion State Bank in 1910. Bailey built the bank on the northwest corner of the public square—no longer extant as a square; it has been bisected by U.S. Highway 271—at the corner of Pearl Street. Bailey's brother, Edgar Bailey, operated a dentist office in the rear two rooms.

Continued and enduring prosperity eluded Albion, however, and in approximately 1927 banker Bailey transferred the bank to Talihina, Oklahoma.

== Building ==
The building remained empty until 1930, when J.M. (John Melvin) Armstrong, another prominent Albion businessman, purchased it and opened a grocery store. He closed the store in 1950, converting it into his family residence, where he lived until his death in 1963. His widow continued living there until her death in 1972.

In 1975 the building was purchased by Mrs. Lorene Barnett, who operated a succession of small businesses there. In 1979, at the time of an architectural survey, the building was vacant but in good condition. Its wood plank flooring was original, and also in good condition.

The building was a one-story structure constructed of red brick in a rectangular footprint. It measured 40 feet long and 25 feet wide. The windows were originally arched. The interior ceilings were of pressed copper bearing a decorative design. The original bank vault painted with the words, “Albion State Bank” was mounted in a brick wall and was still present during the survey in 1979.

A water well dug in approximately 1933 was outside the back door.

The architectural survey noted the bank's “considerable integrity” due to remaining “structurally sound and essentially unaltered” and recommended it successfully for inclusion on the National Register of Historic Places.

More information on Albion may be found in the Pushmataha County Historical Society.

== Photo ==
See https://www.flickr.com/photos/koknor/4547890020/ for a photograph of the bank.
