= Antlers, Oklahoma =

Antlers, Oklahoma Kuniotubbee (Choctaw)
- City
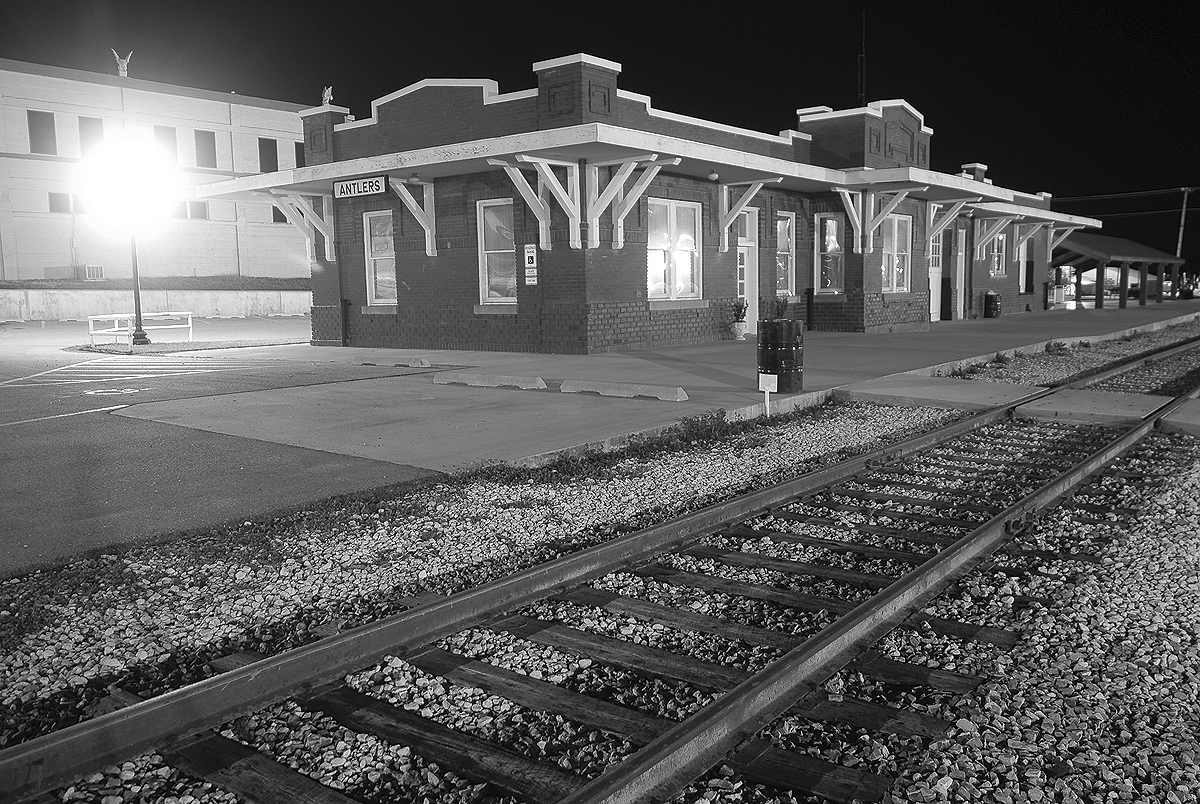
- Antlers historic train station
- Nickname: Deer Capital of the World
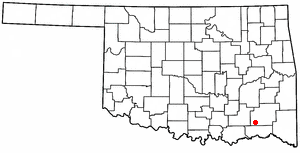
- Location of Antlers, Oklahoma
- Coordinates: 34°13′58″N 95°37′23″W
- Country: United States
- State: Oklahoma
- County: Pushmataha

Area
  - Total: 3.12 sq mi (8.09 km^{2})
  - Land: 3.11 sq mi (8.05 km^{2})
  - Water: 0.015 sq mi (0.04 km^{2})
- Elevation: 509 ft (155 m)

Population (2020)
  - Total: 2,221
  - Density: 714.5/sq mi (275.86/km^{2})
- Time zone: UTC-6 (Central (CST))
  - Summer (DST): UTC-5 (CDT)
- ZIP code: 74523
- Area code: 580
- FIPS code: 40-02250
- GNIS feature ID: 2409716

Antlers is a city in and the county seat of Pushmataha County, Oklahoma, United States. The population was 2,221 as of the 2020 United States census. The town was named for a kind of tree that becomes festooned with antlers shed by deer, and is taken as a sign of the location of a spring frequented by deer.

== History ==
Evidence exists of prehistoric occupation and activity within the city limits of present-day Antlers. Arrowheads are found periodically at sites throughout the town. Most of the prehistoric sites are atop hills, which the inhabitants could use for defensive purposes and found the most healthful.

A Mississippian culture settlement developed at Spiro Mounds, which was active from the mid-9th into the 15th century. This is the westernmost site of the culture and it is "one of the most important archeological discoveries in North America." The 80-acre site is preserved today as Oklahoma's only state archeological park.

The Spiro Mounds leaders controlled the area of Antlers and the rest of the Kiamichi River valley, as well as a large portion of what is now southeastern Oklahoma and adjacent states. The Mississippian culture was based along the Mississippi River and its tributaries. Its largest center was at Cahokia, just to the east of the Mississippi in present-day Illinois. The peoples had an extensive trading network that spanned the continent from the Gulf Coast to the Great Lakes. Spiro Mounds culture was also part of the Southeast Ceremonial Complex, an important culture which extended into what is now known as the Southeastern United States.

In the era of European exploration and colonization, the historic Caddo Indians, descendants of the Mississippians, had this area as part of their large territory. Rarely establishing permanent settlements, they were highly nomadic. They lived in bands that were allied in three loose regional confederacies. They lived by gathering plants and nuts, hunting and fishing.

Not recognizing that this was already Caddo territory, the United States granted the lands to the Choctaw Indians in 1832 by the Treaty of Dancing Rabbit Creek. This was in exchange for the Choctaw ceding their land in the American Southeast to the federal government during the period of Indian Removal. The other Five Civilized Tribes (Muskogee (Creek), Cherokee, Chickasaw and Seminole) were also forced to cede their lands in the same period.

The Choctaw established communities that replicated the three major divisions of their people in the Southeast, so there were three centers of loose government. White settler encroachment on their land soon began again. During the American Civil War, most of the Choctaw allied with the Confederate States of America, which had suggested it would support an independent Indian state if it won the war.

During the 1880s the St. Louis–San Francisco Railway, more popularly known as the "Frisco", built a north–south line through the Choctaw Nation, connecting Fort Smith, Arkansas with Paris, Texas. The US treaties required the tribes to grant the railroads rights of way. The railroad paralleled the Kiamichi River throughout much of its route in present-day Pushmataha County. The railroads established train stations every few miles to be centers of new development. They also were the sites of section houses; supervisors for their respective miles of track lived in the section houses to administer the track and its right-of-way. These stations also served as points at which the trains could draw water.

The site of Antlers was selected for a station due to a local freshwater spring. Adjacent stations were established at Davenport — now Kellond — to the north, and Hamden to the south. The Choctaw in this sparsely populated area, at that time known as Jack's Fork County of the Choctaw Nation in the Indian Territory, farmed or subsisted on the land.

The Choctaw had built few roads or improved trails. The Frisco Railroad was the chief form of transportation through the Territory. It offered six trains per day (three in each direction) until it closed to passenger traffic during the mid 1960s. The loss of passenger rail followed the construction of several highways linking Antlers to other communities, including U.S. Highway 271, Oklahoma State Highway 7, and Oklahoma State Highway 2. The southern section of the Indian Nation Turnpike, which has an interchange at Antlers, opened in 1970. The Frisco Railroad continued freight operations until 1981, when it closed altogether and its rails were removed. This was an era of railroad restructuring and reductions nationwide.

A United States Post Office was established at Antlers, Indian Territory, on August 26, 1887. According to early European-American settler Colonel Victor M. Locke, Jr., the following is an account of how the name was attached to it. A hunter was encamped at the spring at present-day Antlers early one autumn and killed a "magnificent buck." He nailed its antlers to a tree close to the spring as a challenge to other hunters, who followed suit. Railroad officials later designated the new station stop as "Antlers" in recognition of this prominent local landmark tree bristling with points.

The Choctaw government allowed some European Americans to settle on their land, but provided them no protections or government services of any kind. During the 1890s the U.S. government acted to provide a minimal level of support. It established Recording Districts throughout the lands of all Five Civilized Tribes of the Indian Territory. Antlers became Record Town of Recording District #24, which covered almost all of present-day Pushmataha, Choctaw and McCurtain counties. American citizens living in this area were provided with the rudiments of a justice system, with a US Court operating on a part-time schedule.

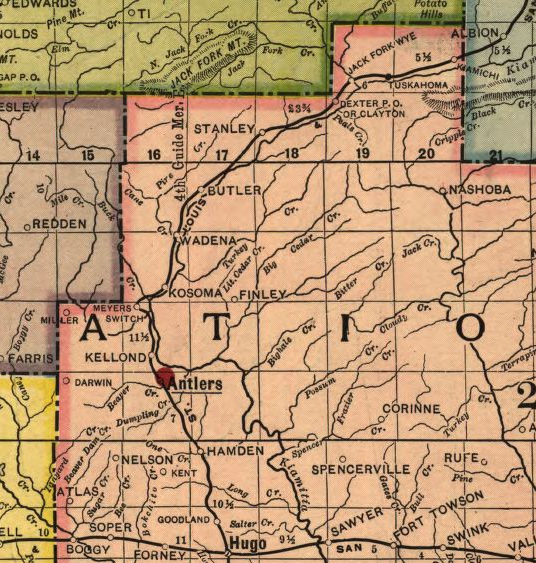
This 1905 map shows Recording District #24, one of several established in the Indian Territory during the 1890s by the Federal Government to provide a justice system for white residents. Antlers was judicial seat, and hosted a U.S. Court. District #24 extended all the way to the Arkansas border.

To support the needs of a Record Town, a United States Court was established at Antlers. A large wooden courthouse was built to accommodate the justices, lawyers and courtroom facilities necessary. Antlers became home to a small government outpost. During the waning days of the Indian Territory, the Republican Party was in power in Washington, D.C. The federal justices, sheriffs, deputies, and court clerks were all appointed by the Republican Party according to patronage practices of the time. The majority of local Native American residents, who had been removed from former Confederate States, had allied with the Confederacy in the hopes of gaining an Indian state. They continued to be affiliated mostly with the Democratic Party.

In order to prepare for Oklahoma's statehood, the United States Government surveyed and plotted every town of significance. Antlers was surveyed in 1901 and a townsite of 182 acres (0.74 km^{2}) was mapped. Once the area was included in a state, residents could establish formal ownership of their homes and property.

Under the Dawes Act and the related Curtis Act, the United States required changes among all the Native American nations in Indian Territory to enable admission of Oklahoma as a state. As part of a policy of assimilation, tribal governments were dissolved and tribal control of communal lands was ended, in order to extinguish Native American land titles. Communal lands were allocated to individual households of members of tribes. Any remaining land the government declared 'surplus' and sold, including to non-Natives. Native Americans lost most of their land in these transactions. The Indian Territory was absorbed into the state of Oklahoma on November 16, 1907. Antlers lost its prized status as a United States federal court town; and many jobs left the town when courts were established elsewhere. Numerous residents left to gain employment in other cities.

Antlers has served as a local resort town, as it is a gateway to the Kiamichi Mountains. Many tourists came to fish, hunt, and relax in the town and nearby mountains. Many came from Paris, Texas. Sustained growth occurred for several decades.

On April 12, 1945, Antlers was devastated by a powerful tornado. Moving southwest to northeast, it destroyed stores and homes in a wide swath, including stores and shops at the south end of High Street. Sixty-seven residents were killed, and more than 300 injured. Antlers High School was adapted as a makeshift morgue to receive bodies. In the 300 block of East Main Street, the large and historic St. Agnes Academy for Choctaw Indians was destroyed. Two nuns were killed but all the students survived. Reporting of the destructive tornado was superseded by coverage of the death of President Franklin D. Roosevelt, which also occurred that day. But the federal government dispatched U.S. Army troops to Antlers from Camp Maxey, Texas, a World War II-era Army base located between Paris and Arthur City, Texas. The troops assisted with rescue, maintaining law and order, and clearing rubble. Another, similarly serious tornado struck Antlers in April 1954 resulting in 40 fatalities.

Meteorologists have since retroactively categorized the Antlers tornado as an F5, the most powerful on the Fujita Scale. Local residents believed that two tornadoes struck the town, with witnesses claiming to have seen two funnels. The Antlers tornado funnel measured a half-mile wide at its base, and the two funnel clouds observed locally were within the larger one. The Antlers F5 was so powerful that it could be clearly heard, as well as seen, four miles (6 km) east of town at the Ethel Road crossroads, and as far north as Kosoma.

After 1945 the town had growth and improvements similar to those in other parts of the United States. With the advent of universal electrical service, most homes gained air-conditioning, and later almost all households acquired televisions. Social relations changed at this point, as individuals and families found their entertainment indoors, rather than outdoors or downtown.

In 1975 R.C. Pruett opened East Town Village on the eastern outskirts of Antlers. He duplicated the kind of development taking place across the country, with major retailers relocating from historic downtowns to larger facilities on the outskirts. Pruett's grocery store was new. But within a few years, merchants began deserting Antlers' historic downtown for sites at East Town Village or other locations, or closing altogether.

At the same time, Antlers residents began shopping at Wal-Mart, which offered greater variety and lower prices than Antlers' local merchants were able to offer. In recent years there has been an effort to declare Antlers a "Main Street USA" site, to treat its historic center as a destination, and emphasize its architecture. Due to a series of arson and fires beginning in the 1970s, Antlers lost a number of its stores, changing the character of its downtown. But the remaining buildings are sturdy brick with antique facades. In recent years merchants have been removing the 1960s-era awnings and other structures, adopted in a modernization effort, to return the buildings to their unique historic character.

During recent years the Antlers Frisco Depot and Antlers Spring have been added to the National Register of Historic Places, as they contribute to the architecture and history of the town. The depot was built in 1913, at a time when the state had imposed legal racial segregation. Its separate waiting rooms and toilets for white and black passengers expressed the racial inequality and lack of civil rights for minorities that was incorporated into the design of public buildings. More information on the history of Antlers may be found at the Pushmataha County Historical Society.

== Geography ==
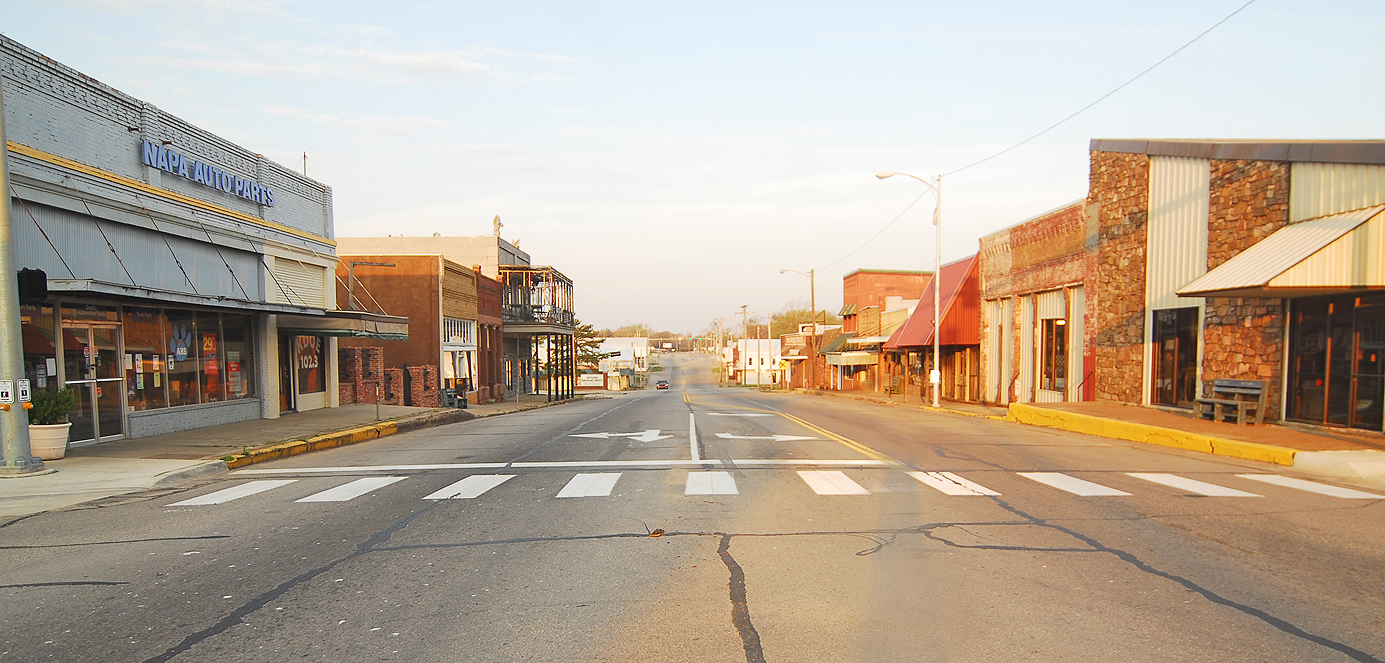
Part of historic downtown Antlers

According to the United States Census Bureau, the city has a total area of 2.7 square miles (7.0 km^{2}), all land.

The historic center of Antlers—not including its newly expanded city limits—straddles at least two watersheds. Rain falling in the northeast part of town drains into creeks flowing northward directly into the Kiamichi River. This soil is rocky, with bedrock near the surface. Water falling elsewhere in the town drains into creeks draining southward into Beaver Creek, which flows to the Kiamichi River. This soil is sandy. Standpipe Hill—which overlooks downtown Antlers—stands considerably higher, and overlooks the Kiamichi River valley to the north.

=== Climate ===
According to the Köppen Climate Classification system, Antlers has a humid subtropical climate, abbreviated "Cfa" on climate maps. The hottest temperature recorded in Antlers was 116 °F (46.7 °C) on August 10, 1936, while the coldest temperature recorded was −10 °F (−23.3 °C) on February 2, 1951.

Climate data for Antlers, Oklahoma, 1991–2020 normals, extremes 1918–present
Month	Jan	Feb	Mar	Apr	May	Jun	Jul	Aug	Sep	Oct	Nov	Dec	Year
Record high °F (°C)	84 (29)	90 (32)	93 (34)	96 (36)	101 (38)	107 (42)	112 (44)	116 (47)	110 (43)	102 (39)	89 (32)	83 (28)	116 (47)
Mean maximum °F (°C)	72.3 (22.4)	77.2 (25.1)	82.6 (28.1)	85.5 (29.7)	90.3 (32.4)	94.7 (34.8)	100.3 (37.9)	100.5 (38.1)	96.6 (35.9)	89.0 (31.7)	80.3 (26.8)	73.7 (23.2)	101.9 (38.8)
Mean daily maximum °F (°C)	52.4 (11.3)	57.2 (14.0)	64.7 (18.2)	72.9 (22.7)	80.0 (26.7)	87.8 (31.0)	92.8 (33.8)	93.3 (34.1)	86.4 (30.2)	76.0 (24.4)	63.7 (17.6)	54.5 (12.5)	73.5 (23.0)
Daily mean °F (°C)	40.4 (4.7)	45.1 (7.3)	52.5 (11.4)	60.9 (16.1)	69.7 (20.9)	77.8 (25.4)	81.8 (27.7)	81.4 (27.4)	74.1 (23.4)	62.9 (17.2)	51.3 (10.7)	42.8 (6.0)	61.7 (16.5)
Mean daily minimum °F (°C)	28.5 (−1.9)	32.9 (0.5)	40.3 (4.6)	48.8 (9.3)	59.3 (15.2)	67.7 (19.8)	70.7 (21.5)	69.4 (20.8)	61.8 (16.6)	49.8 (9.9)	39.0 (3.9)	31.1 (−0.5)	49.9 (10.0)
Mean minimum °F (°C)	13.8 (−10.1)	18.1 (−7.7)	22.5 (−5.3)	31.9 (−0.1)	42.4 (5.8)	56.3 (13.5)	62.7 (17.1)	60.2 (15.7)	46.9 (8.3)	32.8 (0.4)	22.6 (−5.2)	17.1 (−8.3)	10.9 (−11.7)
Record low °F (°C)	−9 (−23)	−10 (−23)	8 (−13)	24 (−4)	31 (−1)	45 (7)	50 (10)	49 (9)	36 (2)	19 (−7)	7 (−14)	−5 (−21)	−10 (−23)
Average precipitation inches (mm)	2.86 (73)	2.90 (74)	4.05 (103)	4.36 (111)	6.25 (159)	4.33 (110)	3.35 (85)	3.09 (78)	3.89 (99)	4.85 (123)	3.88 (99)	4.11 (104)	47.92 (1,218)
Average snowfall inches (cm)	0.0 (0.0)	0.3 (0.76)	0.0 (0.0)	0.0 (0.0)	0.0 (0.0)	0.0 (0.0)	0.0 (0.0)	0.0 (0.0)	0.0 (0.0)	0.0 (0.0)	0.0 (0.0)	0.0 (0.0)	0.3 (0.76)
Average precipitation days (≥ 0.01 in)	5.8	6.5	8.4	7.9	9.3	7.8	6.4	5.9	6.2	6.7	6.0	6.6	83.5
Average snowy days (≥ 0.1 in)	0.1	0.0	0.1	0.0	0.0	0.0	0.0	0.0	0.0	0.0	0.0	0.0	0.2
Source 1: NOAA
Source 2: National Weather Service

== Demographics ==
Historical population
Census	Pop.	Note	%±
1910	1,273		—
1920	1,842		44.7%
1930	2,246		21.9%
1940	3,254		44.9%
1950	2,506		−23.0%
1960	2,085		−16.8%
1970	2,685		28.8%
1980	2,989		11.3%
1990	2,524		−15.6%
2000	2,552		1.1%
2010	2,453		−3.9%
2020	2,221		−9.5%
U.S. Decennial Census

=== 2020 census ===
As of the 2020 census, Antlers had a population of 2,221. The median age was 39.6 years. 23.2% of residents were under the age of 18 and 20.0% of residents were 65 years of age or older. For every 100 females there were 87.0 males, and for every 100 females age 18 and over there were 82.7 males age 18 and over.

<0.1% of residents lived in urban areas, while 100.0% lived in rural areas.

There were 916 households in Antlers, of which 33.4% had children under the age of 18 living in them. Of all households, 34.1% were married-couple households, 18.8% were households with a male householder and no spouse or partner present, and 40.5% were households with a female householder and no spouse or partner present. About 35.2% of all households were made up of individuals and 15.9% had someone living alone who was 65 years of age or older.

There were 1,081 housing units, of which 15.3% were vacant. Among occupied housing units, 53.9% were owner-occupied and 46.1% were renter-occupied. The homeowner vacancy rate was 2.8% and the rental vacancy rate was 9.5%.

Racial composition as of the 2020 census
Race	Percent
White	65.8%
Black or African American	1.4%
American Indian and Alaska Native	18.6%
Asian	0.8%
Native Hawaiian and Other Pacific Islander	<0.1%
Some other race	1.2%
Two or more races	12.3%
Hispanic or Latino (of any race)	4.2%

=== 2010 census ===
As of the census of 2010, there were 2,453 people living in the city. The population density was 931.1 inhabitants per square mile (359.5/km^{2}). There were 1,177 housing units at an average density of 455 per square mile (176/km^{2}). The racial makeup of the city was 78.13% White, 1.84% African American, 14.93% Native American, 0.08% Asian, 0.31% from other races, and 4.70% from two or more races. Hispanic or Latino of any race were 1.76% of the population.

There were 1,068 households, out of which 30.5% had children under the age of 18 living with them, 41.5% were married couples living together, 17.4% had a female householder with no husband present, and 38.9% were non-families. 35.5% of all households were made up of individuals, and 20.5% had someone living alone who was 65 years of age or older. The average household size was 2.28 and the average family size was 2.96.

In the city, the population was spread out, with 26.7% under the age of 18, 7.5% from 18 to 24, 23.7% from 25 to 44, 19.9% from 45 to 64, and 22.3% who were 65 years of age or older. The median age was 38 years. For every 100 females, there were 78.1 males. For every 100 females age 18 and over, there were 72.4 males.

The median income for a household in the city was $17,594, and the median income for a family was $22,684. Males had a median income of $23,958 versus $16,688 for females. The per capita income for the city was $11,285. About 28.9% of families and 31.6% of the population were below the poverty line, including 42.7% of those under age 18 and 23.2% of those age 65 or over.

== Government ==
The city has a council-manager government system. The city council is made up of five members, one from each of the four wards in the city, and one at large member. The city manager, city attorney, and municipal judge are appointed by the council. The Mayor is also appointed by the council.

== Education ==
The city has three schools: Antlers Elementary (Grades PreK-5), Obuch Middle School (Grades 6-8), and Antlers High School (9-12).

== Transportation ==
U.S. Route 271 and Oklahoma State Highway 3 run through town, while Oklahoma State Highway 2 has its southern terminus in Antlers, and the city borders the Indian Nation Turnpike (a.k.a. Oklahoma State Highway 375) on one side.

Antlers Municipal Airport (FAA Identifier: 80F), about 3 miles southwest of Antlers, features a 4001’ x 60’ asphalt runway.

== Notable people ==
- Nicole DeHuff - actress
- Charles C. Stephenson Jr. - energy company CEO
