= Cherokee, Oklahoma =

City in Oklahoma, US

- City
- City of Cherokee
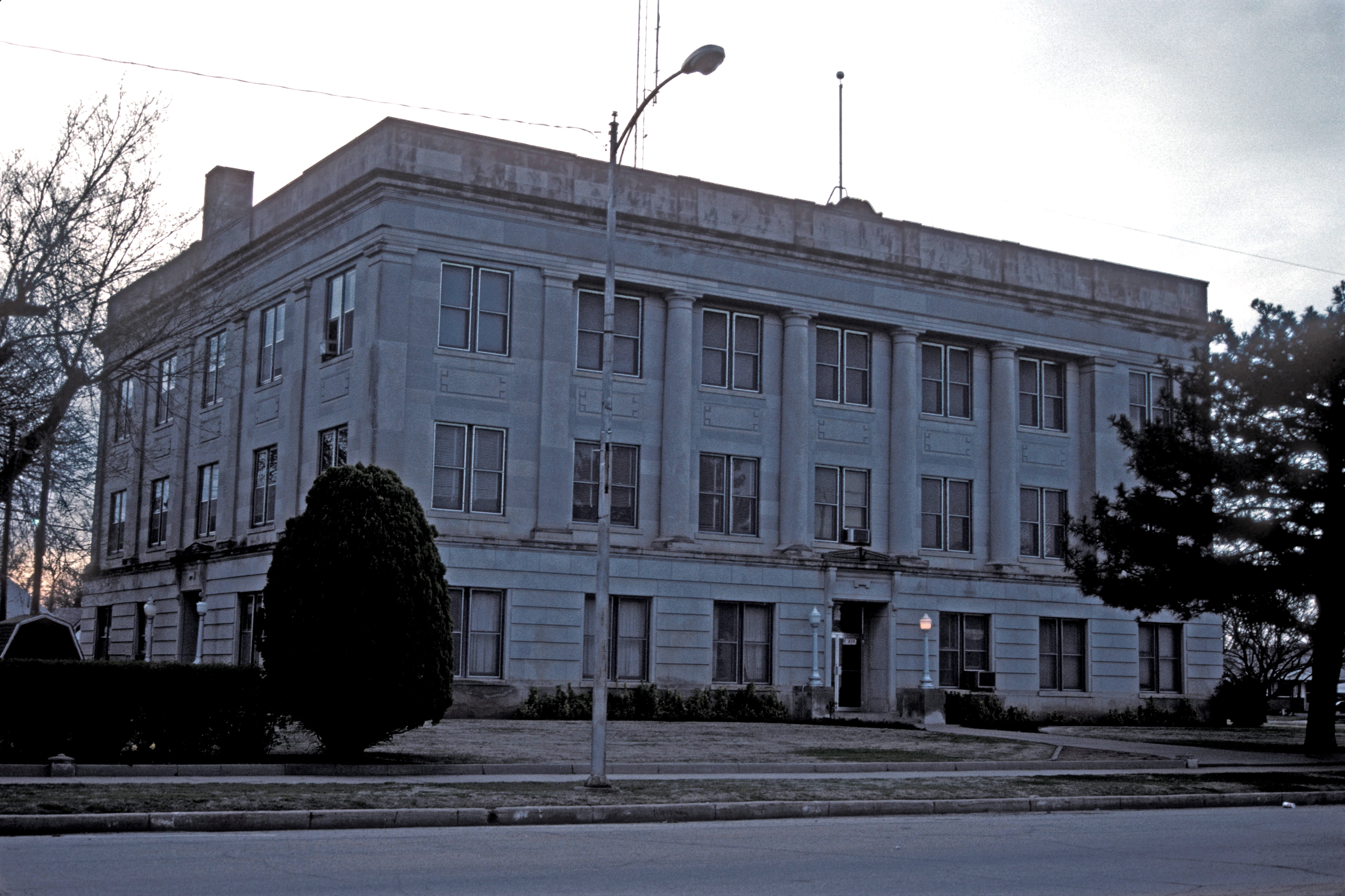
- Alfalfa County Courthouse in Cherokee (2007)

- Seal

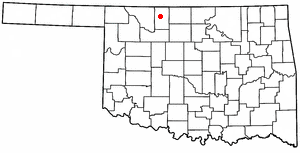
- Location within Oklahoma

- Location within Oklahoma Location within the United States
- Coordinates: 36°45′02″N 98°21′28″W
- Country: United States
- State: Oklahoma
- County: Alfalfa

Area
  - Total: 2.04 sq mi (5.29 km^{2})
  - Land: 2.04 sq mi (5.29 km^{2})
  - Water: 0 sq mi (0.00 km^{2})
- Elevation: 1,178 ft (359 m)

Population (2020)
  - Total: 1,476
  - Density: 722.7/sq mi (279.05/km^{2})
- Time zone: UTC-6 (Central (CST))
  - Summer (DST): UTC-5 (CDT)
- ZIP code: 73728
- Area code: 580
- FIPS code: 40-13750
- GNIS ID: 2409442
- Website: www.cherokee-ok.us

Cherokee is the largest city within, and county seat of, Alfalfa County, Oklahoma, United States. The population was 1,476 at the 2020 census, a decline of 1.5 percent from 2010.

== History ==
=== Settlement and founding ===
After the land opening of 1893, developers wanted to attract railroads to build through the former Cherokee Outlet to transport the large wheat crops to markets. The Kansas and Oklahoma Construction Company, through its subsidiary the Cherokee Investment Company, bought 100 acres (40 ha) along its route, platted the town which it named Cherokee, and held a sale of lots on February 9, 1901. Cherokee officially incorporated in July 1901. Two years later, the Kansas City, Mexico and Orient Railroad (later owned by the Atchison, Topeka and Santa Fe Railway) constructed a line through Cherokee. To gain access to the railroad, residents of the nearby community of Erwin, which already had a post office by that name, relocated to Cherokee. Erwin then ceased to exist and Cherokee took its place. This post office was renamed "Cherokee" in March, 1903.

By 1905, a second railroad, the Denver, Enid, and Gulf, built a line through the community. The community was soon transformed into a dominant regional center for agricultural services, banking, wholesale-retail trade, and transportation, providing markets and services to the surrounding smaller communities, such as Ingersoll, Burlington, Driftwood, Byron, and Amorita. The town grew around its twin railroad depots, and by 1909 Cherokee had three banks, three newspapers, three mills (flour, alfalfa, and planning), a concrete block plant, and a school desk factory. There were also Baptist, Catholic, Christian, Friends, Methodist, and Presbyterian churches.

Alfalfa County itself - named after Governor 'Alfalfa Bill' Murray - was created at the time of statehood in 1907, when the state reorganized several counties out of part of what was once the much larger Woods County. Cherokee's status as the official county seat of Alfalfa County was confirmed in January 1909. The city's incorporation was reconfirmed in March of that same year.

=== Years of prosperity ===
The Masonic hospital was relocated from nearby Aline in 1918. A new high school building was completed in 1921. There were a variety of industries to provide employment, including: Cherokee Mills Company which produced flour, the McDowell Standard Battery Company's factory, an ice plant, and a planing mill. With a successful bond election, a new county courthouse was completed in 1924. The 1920s also saw a variety of other public projects, including street improvements and public water supply. In addition, oil-field activity within the county during the late 1920s and the mid-1930s contributed to the city's prosperity, with a half-dozen oil companies maintaining storage facilities near the railroad yards. At the onset of the Great Depression, Cherokee had become "an important urban and trading center."

Cherokee was better situated than most communities to weather the downturn of the depression. With its many hotels, including: The Hotel Cherokee, Hotel Henderson, the Ideal Hotel, Jobe's Hotel, and the Orient Hotel, the city's business owners worked hard to promote the town as a convention destination. They were successful in attracting a variety of organizations including the Oklahoma State Holiness Association, the Woman's Christian Temperance Union, and the 4-H Clubs in 1933, the Baptist Association and the Tri-County Masonic Association in 1935, and the Oklahoma Press Association Regional Meeting and the Northwestern Oklahoma Baptist Association Annual Dinner in 1936.

By 1936, the city boasted eleven gasoline stations, five automobile dealerships, five garages, plus three lumber yards. There were also four grain elevators in operation, plus an ice cream factory. In addition, Cherokee had nine restaurants, five groceries, two bakeries, two banks, two hardware stores, two department stores, as well as approximately two dozen other retail businesses. Two newspapers, the Alfalfa County News and the Cherokee Messenger, informed the public.

The Works Progress Administration (WPA) completed construction of a National Guard Armory in 1937, along with a public library in 1939. Its proximity to the Great Salt Plains area attracted sporting activities including bird-hunting excursions, which boosted the economy by bringing in hundreds of travelers. Construction of a dam on the Salt Fork of the Arkansas River begun in 1938 - completed in 1941 - would create the Great Salt Plains Lake, making the area even more desirable as a hunting and tourism spot.

=== 1950s onward ===
The population of Cherokee would peak in 1950, at 2,635, according to the U.S. Census, and continue to trend downward at each enumeration from that decade onward. By 1970, 125 businesses remained operating in a city of 2,119 inhabitants. The county took over the operation of the former Masonic hospital in 1976. A new industrial park was established in that same decade. By 1990, the population had fallen to below 2000 - to 1,787 - for the first time since the city was recognized as the county seat. The Santa Fe Railroad maintained its trunk line running north–south through the mid-1990s, and the city's east–west line, by then part of the Burlington Northern Santa Fe, ceased operations shortly thereafter.

The city of Cherokee has a city manager form of government. It maintains three parks plus a swimming pool. Cherokee continues to be the home of one of three public school districts (in addition to Burlington and Timberlake) to educate the county's children. Cherokee has one high school. The school mascot is the Cherokee Chiefs.

=== National Register of Historic Places designations ===
Cherokee is the home of several sites listed on the National Register of Historic Places (NRHP), including the Cherokee Friends Church, constructed in 1919, and the Cherokee IOOF Lodge No. 219, built in 1931. Other Cherokee sites listed with the NRHP are the Farmers' Federation Elevator (ca. 1917), the Alfalfa County Courthouse (ca. 1921), the Cherokee National Guard Armory (ca. 1936), and the Hotel Cherokee (ca. 1929) - which currently serves as the county history center.

== Geography ==
Cherokee is located in northern Oklahoma, along U.S. Highway 64/State Highway 8. According to the United States Census Bureau, the city has a total area of 1.473 square miles (3.82 km^{2}), all land.

The Salt Plains National Wildlife Refuge is located a few miles southeast of Cherokee. The salt plains are known for their unique hour-glass selenite crystals.

On 11 July 1909, at 3:00 in the morning, a heat burst south of Cherokee reportedly caused the temperature to rise briefly to 136 °F (57.8 °C), desiccating crops in the area.

=== Climate ===
Cherokee has a humid subtropical climate (Köppen: Cfa) with influences from a cool semi-arid climate (BSk)

Climate data for Cherokee, Oklahoma
Month	Jan	Feb	Mar	Apr	May	Jun	Jul	Aug	Sep	Oct	Nov	Dec	Year
Record high °F (°C)	86 (30)	91 (33)	96 (36)	100 (38)	105 (41)	115 (46)	117 (47)	117 (47)	111 (44)	101 (38)	90 (32)	85 (29)	117 (47)
Mean daily maximum °F (°C)	47.1 (8.4)	52.7 (11.5)	62.8 (17.1)	72.6 (22.6)	81.3 (27.4)	91.1 (32.8)	96.7 (35.9)	95.8 (35.4)	86.9 (30.5)	75.8 (24.3)	60.3 (15.7)	49.4 (9.7)	72.7 (22.6)
Mean daily minimum °F (°C)	22.7 (−5.2)	26.9 (−2.8)	35.2 (1.8)	45.0 (7.2)	55.4 (13.0)	65.3 (18.5)	70.2 (21.2)	69.3 (20.7)	60.5 (15.8)	48.2 (9.0)	34.8 (1.6)	25.7 (−3.5)	46.6 (8.1)
Record low °F (°C)	−15 (−26)	−15 (−26)	−1 (−18)	13 (−11)	30 (−1)	36 (2)	50 (10)	45 (7)	30 (−1)	12 (−11)	6 (−14)	−12 (−24)	−15 (−26)
Average precipitation inches (mm)	0.90 (23)	1.11 (28)	2.15 (55)	2.74 (70)	4.08 (104)	4.08 (104)	2.48 (63)	2.95 (75)	2.56 (65)	1.29 (33)	1.49 (38)	1.12 (28)	26.95 (686)
Average snowfall inches (cm)	2.4 (6.1)	3.2 (8.1)	1.7 (4.3)	0.1 (0.25)	0.0 (0.0)	0.0 (0.0)	0.0 (0.0)	0.0 (0.0)	0.0 (0.0)	0.0 (0.0)	0.8 (2.0)	2.7 (6.9)	10.9 (27.65)
Average precipitation days (≥ 0.01 inch)	3	4	5	6	7	7	5	6	5	5	3	3	58
Source: Western Regional Climate Center

Please note: Many temperatures claiming to be above 56.7 °C (134.1 °F) are unverifiable claims due to improper equipment at site to confirm during the event. The hottest verifiable temperature ever recorded for the state of Oklahoma is 48.8 °C (119.8 °F) The world's hottest verifiable temperature remains 56.7 °C (134.1 °F), recorded on 10 July 1913 at Furnace Creek Ranch, in Death Valley in the United States.

== Demographics ==
Historical population
Census	Pop.	Note	%±
1910	2,016		—
1920	2,017		0.0%
1930	2,236		10.9%
1940	2,553		14.2%
1950	2,635		3.2%
1960	2,410		−8.5%
1970	2,119		−12.1%
1980	2,105		−0.7%
1990	1,787		−15.1%
2000	1,630		−8.8%
2010	1,498		−8.1%
2020	1,476		−1.5%
U.S. Decennial Census

=== 2020 census ===
As of the 2020 census, Cherokee had a population of 1,476. The median age was 39.1 years. 26.2% of residents were under the age of 18 and 18.8% of residents were 65 years of age or older. For every 100 females there were 98.1 males, and for every 100 females age 18 and over there were 96.9 males age 18 and over.

0% of residents lived in urban areas, while 100.0% lived in rural areas.

There were 628 households in Cherokee, of which 30.7% had children under the age of 18 living in them. Of all households, 49.2% were married-couple households, 20.9% were households with a male householder and no spouse or partner present, and 24.0% were households with a female householder and no spouse or partner present. About 34.4% of all households were made up of individuals and 17.1% had someone living alone who was 65 years of age or older.

There were 843 housing units, of which 25.5% were vacant. Among occupied housing units, 70.5% were owner-occupied and 29.5% were renter-occupied. The homeowner vacancy rate was 2.4% and the rental vacancy rate was 19.6%.

Racial composition as of the 2020 census
Race	Percent
White	87.3%
Black or African American	0.5%
American Indian and Alaska Native	1.8%
Asian	0.2%
Native Hawaiian and Other Pacific Islander	0%
Some other race	1.6%
Two or more races	8.6%
Hispanic or Latino (of any race)	6.8%

=== 2010 census ===
As of the 2010 census, the Census Bureau reported 1,498 people, 647 households and 396 family households in the city. 93.6% of its population was white, 2.8% was American Indian and Alaska Native, while 0.7% were black/African American. 49.9% were male and 50.1% were female. The average household size was 2.24 and the average family size was 2.88 persons. The percent of the population 18 years and older was 77.4%, or 1160 persons, while 20.9%, or 313 persons, were 65 years and older. The median age was 44.3 years.

=== 2000 census ===
As of the 2000 census, there were 1,630 people, 709 households, and 450 families residing in the city. The population density was 1,113.9 people per square mile (430.1 people/km^{2}). There were 853 housing units at an average density of 582.9 per square mile (225.1/km^{2}). The racial makeup of the city was 95.52% White, 0.12% African American, 1.72% Native American, 1.47% from other races, and 1.17% from two or more races. Hispanic or Latino of any race were 3.74% of the population.

There were 709 households, out of which 28.9% had children under the age of 18 living with them, 53.7% were married couples living together, 7.5% had a female householder with no husband present, and 36.5% were non-families. 34.8% of all households were made up of individuals, and 19.7% had someone living alone who was 65 years of age or older. The average household size was 2.26 and the average family size was 2.93.

In the city, the population was spread out, with 24.6% under the age of 18, 6.3% from 18 to 24, 23.3% from 25 to 44, 22.8% from 45 to 64, and 23.1% who were 65 years of age or older. The median age was 42 years. For every 100 females, there were 91.3 males. For every 100 females age 18 and over, there were 90.8 males.

The median income for a household in the city was $29,010, and the median income for a family was $34,934. Males had a median income of $25,263 versus $16,759 for females. The per capita income for the city was $16,163. About 10.5% of families and 13.7% of the population were below the poverty line, including 20.6% of those under age 18 and 8.2% of those age 65 or over.

== Economy ==
Cherokee is primarily a farming community, although historically, oil field activity has also played a significant role in the city's prosperity.

== See also ==
- National Register of Historic Places listings in Alfalfa County, Oklahoma
