= Oklahoma State Highway 11 =

Highway in Oklahoma

State Highway 11

Route information
- Maintained by ODOT
- Length: 204.9 mi (329.8 km)

Major junctions
- West end: US 281 north of Alva
- US 64 / SH-8 / SH-58 in Ingersoll; US 81 in Medford; I-35 in Blackwell; US 77 in Kildare; US 60 from Burbank to Pawhuska; US 75 / Gilcrease Expressway in Tulsa
- East end: I-244 / US 412 in Tulsa

Location
- Country: United States
- State: Oklahoma

Highway system
- Oklahoma State Highway System; Interstate; US; State; Turnpikes
← SH-10	→ SH-14

State Highway 11 (abbreviated SH-11) is a state highway in Oklahoma. It runs in an irregular west-to-east path 204.9 miles (329.8 km) across the northern part of the state, from U.S. Highway 281 (US-281) seven miles (11 km) north of Alva to Interstate 244 (I-244) / US-412 in Tulsa. There is one letter-suffixed spur highway branching from SH-11, SH-11A.

== Route description ==
From its beginning at US-281, SH-11 travels east through the town of Capron. 9 miles (14 km) later, it reaches SH-8. SH-11 and SH-8 overlap for 7 miles (11 km), passing through the town of Burlington along the way. SH-8 / SH-11 meet SH-58 three miles (4.8 km) east of Burlington, and turn south, forming a three-route concurrency. The combined route passes through the unincorporated community of Driftwood and intersects US-64 just west of the town of Ingersoll. At this point, SH-11 turns to the east, leaving SH-8 and SH-58.

SH-11 passes through the northern part of Great Salt Plains State Park, and after 11 miles (18 km), intersects with SH-38. SH-11 continues on another seven miles (11 km), before intersecting with SH-132. Six miles to the east, SH-11's only spur route, SH-11A, branches off to the north, connecting to the town of Wakita. SH-11 travels another 11 miles (18 km) to the east, intersecting US-81 in Medford, the seat of Grant County. After leaving Medford, SH-11 runs another 10 miles (16 km) to the east, passing through Numa (unincorporated), before its junction with SH-74. From there, SH-11 heads east for 12 miles (19 km), passing through Deer Creek and running just to the north of Nardin (unincorporated), intersecting I-35 three miles (4.8 km) west of Blackwell.

SH-11 is four lanes divided for the three miles (4.8 km) to its junction with US-177 in Blackwell, then reverts to two lanes for the 12 miles (19 km) to its junction with US-77, six miles (9.7 km) south of Newkirk. Here, the route turns south, joining with US-77 for 3 miles (4.8 km), before turning back to the east 5 miles (8.0 km) north of Ponca City. After 12 miles (19 km), SH-11 passes through Kaw City, and crosses Kaw Lake, then runs another 13 miles (21 km) to SH-18, in Shidler.

SH-11 then joins with SH-18 for 9 miles (14 km), running south through the Osage County oil fields. Just east of Burbank, SH-11 leaves SH-18 for a 20 miles (32 km) concurrency with US-60 across the rolling Osage prairie to Pawhuska, the seat of Osage County. SH-11 then turns south on a five-mile (8 km) concurrency with SH-99, then turns back to the east, passing through more rugged terrain, through Pershing and Tallant (both unincorporated), before entering the oil town of Barnsdall 10 miles (16 km) later.

Just east of Barnsdall, SH-11 serves as the southern terminus of SH-123, which connects to Woolaroc Museum. SH-11 then heads roughly southeast, through Wolco (unincorporated), and skirts Avant, turning due south upon entering Tulsa County, before intersecting SH-20 on the east end of Skiatook.

After leaving Skiatook, SH-11 continues south as Cincinnati Avenue in Tulsa County, and 5 miles (8.0 km) later, doglegs a mile to the east at Sperry. SH-11 then resumes its path to the south as Peoria Avenue, passes through Turley (unincorporated), and enters the city of Tulsa at 56th Street North. SH-11 is a four-lane arterial street along Peoria Avenue, and at 36th Street North, turns to the east, going 1½ miles to US-75, the Cherokee Expressway. SH-11 briefly overlaps southbound US-75, then turns back to the east as the Gilcrease Expressway, passing by Tulsa International Airport before arcing back to the south. It then reaches its eastern terminus at I-244 / US-412 in east Tulsa.

== SH-11A ==

State Highway 11A is a short state highway in Grant County. It runs for 5 miles (8.0 km) from SH-11 north to the town of Wakita.

== Junction list ==
County	Location	mi	km	Destinations	Notes
Woods		0.0	0.0	US 281	Western terminus
Alfalfa		9.0	14.5	SH-8	Northern end of SH-8 concurrency
Alfalfa	Driftwood	15.9	25.6	SH-58	Northern end of SH-58 concurrency
Alfalfa	Ingersoll	22.9	36.9	US 64 / SH-8 / SH-58	Southern end of SH-8 / SH-58 concurrency
Alfalfa		33.8	54.4	SH-38	Northern terminus of SH-38
Grant		40.8	65.7	SH-132	
Grant		46.8	75.3	SH-11A	Southern terminus of SH-11A
Grant	Medford	57.7	92.9	US 81	
Grant		67.7	109.0	SH-74	Northern terminus of SH-74
Kay	Blackwell	79.3	127.6	I-35	Exit 222 on I-35
Kay	Blackwell	82.6	132.9	US 177	
Kay	Kildare	94.5	152.1	US 77	Northern end of US-77 concurrency
Kay		97.5	156.9	US 77	Southern end of US-77 concurrency
Osage	Shidler	120.4	193.8	SH-18	Northern end of SH-18 concurrency
Osage		129.1	207.8	US 60 / SH-18	Southern end of SH-18 concurrency; western end of US-60 concurrency
Osage	Pawhuska	150.4	242.0	US 60 / SH-99	Eastern end of US-60 concurrency; southern end of SH-99 concurrency
Osage		155.7	250.6	SH-99	Northern end of SH-99 concurrency
Osage	Barnsdall	166.4	267.8	SH-123	
Washington	No major junctions				
Tulsa	Skiatook	185.2	298.1	SH-20	
Tulsa	Tulsa	198.9	320.1	US 75	Diamond interchange; northern end of US-75 concurrency
Tulsa	Tulsa	199.8	321.5	US 75 / Gilcrease Expressway	Stack interchange; southern end of US-75 concurrency
Tulsa	Tulsa	200.0	321.9	Harvard Avenue	
Tulsa	Tulsa	200.9	323.3	Yale Avenue	
Tulsa	Tulsa	201.9	324.9	Apache Street / Sheridan Road – Tulsa Zoo	Apache Street not signed westbound
Tulsa	Tulsa	202.9	326.5	Virgin Street – Airport Terminal	Virgin Street not signed eastbound
Tulsa	Tulsa	203.5	327.5	Memorial Drive / Pine Street	Signed for Memorial Drive eastbound, Pine Street westbound
Tulsa	Tulsa	204.9	329.8	I-244 / US 412 – Downtown Tulsa, Joplin	Eastern terminus; exit 12B on I-244
1.000 mi = 1.609 km; 1.000 km = 0.621 mi: Concurrency terminus
