= Goltry, Oklahoma =

Town in Oklahoma, US

- Town
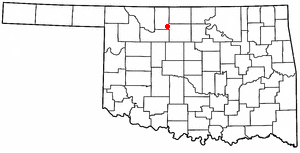
- Location of Goltry, Oklahoma
- Coordinates: 36°31′55″N 98°09′03″W
- Country: United States
- State: Oklahoma
- County: Alfalfa

Area
  - Total: 0.40 sq mi (1.04 km^{2})
  - Land: 0.40 sq mi (1.04 km^{2})
  - Water: 0 sq mi (0.00 km^{2})
- Elevation: 1,375 ft (419 m)

Population (2020)
  - Total: 251
  - Density: 627.5/sq mi (242.28/km^{2})
- Time zone: UTC-6 (Central (CST))
  - Summer (DST): UTC-5 (CDT)
- ZIP code: 73739
- Area code: 580
- FIPS code: 40-29900
- GNIS feature ID: 2412690

Goltry is a town in Alfalfa County, Oklahoma, United States. The population was 251 at the 2020 census.

== History ==
Originally part of the Cherokee Outlet, the area of present-day Goltry was not open to non-Indian settlement until September 1893. After the opening, a settlement called Karoma emerged on the John Streich farm, approximately one and one-half miles southeast of present Goltry. The Arkansas Valley and Western Railway (later part of the St. Louis and San Francisco Railway, or Frisco, system) constructed a line in 1904 from east to west apart the former Woods County that became present-day Alfalfa County, after the creation of the latter 1907. The people of Karoma moved most of their homes and businesses closer to the railroad. In 1904, John Linden’s townsite company surveyed and platted the town on 240 acres. The new community was incorporated and named for Enid resident Charles Goltry, who owned the land and whose milling company constructed a grain elevator there. Many of the early settlers were Germans from Russia, in addition to a number from the then German state of Bohemia and from Switzerland. At one time, Goltry was home to two German Mennonite churches. The remaining Mennonite church, the Pleasant View Church of God in Christ Mennonite, was organized in 1905, by settlers who began to arrive in 1900. As late as 2000, one-third of the town's residents claimed German ancestry. Goltry is also the birthplace of Wally Parks (1913-2007), the founder of the National Hot Rod Association.

== Geography ==
Situated in far southeastern Alfalfa County, Goltry lies along State Highway 45. Goltry lies midway between the county seat of Cherokee, and the nearest city, Enid, via the aforementioned State Highway 45.

According to the United States Census Bureau, the town has a total area of 0.375 square miles (0.97 km^{2}), all land.

== Demographics ==
Historical population
Census	Pop.	Note	%±
1910	320		—
1920	287		−10.3%
1930	346		20.6%
1940	330		−4.6%
1950	277		−16.1%
1960	313		13.0%
1970	282		−9.9%
1980	305		8.2%
1990	297		−2.6%
2000	268		−9.8%
2010	249		−7.1%
2020	251		0.8%
U.S. Decennial Census

=== 2020 census ===
As of the 2020 census, Goltry had a population of 251. The median age was 43.1 years. 23.5% of residents were under the age of 18 and 20.7% of residents were 65 years of age or older. For every 100 females there were 100.8 males, and for every 100 females age 18 and over there were 100.0 males age 18 and over.

0.0% of residents lived in urban areas, while 100.0% lived in rural areas.

There were 102 households in Goltry, of which 27.5% had children under the age of 18 living in them. Of all households, 56.9% were married-couple households, 16.7% were households with a male householder and no spouse or partner present, and 22.5% were households with a female householder and no spouse or partner present. About 27.5% of all households were made up of individuals and 18.6% had someone living alone who was 65 years of age or older.

There were 125 housing units, of which 18.4% were vacant. The homeowner vacancy rate was 2.2% and the rental vacancy rate was 8.3%.

Racial composition as of the 2020 census
Race	Number	Percent
White	222	88.4%
Black or African American	0	0.0%
American Indian and Alaska Native	6	2.4%
Asian	0	0.0%
Native Hawaiian and Other Pacific Islander	0	0.0%
Some other race	0	0.0%
Two or more races	23	9.2%
Hispanic or Latino (of any race)	1	0.4%

=== 2000 census ===
As of the census of 2000, there were 268 people, 120 households, and 72 families residing in the town. The population density was 731.9 inhabitants per square mile (282.6/km^{2}). There were 146 housing units at an average density of 398.7 per square mile (153.9/km^{2}). The racial makeup of the town was 92.54% White, 4.10% Native American, and 3.36% from two or more races.

There were 120 households, out of which 25.8% had children under the age of 18 living with them, 52.5% were married couples living together, 6.7% had a female householder with no husband present, and 39.2% were non-families. 36.7% of all households were made up of individuals, and 20.8% had someone living alone who was 65 years of age or older. The average household size was 2.23 and the average family size was 2.95.

In the town, the population was spread out, with 25.0% under the age of 18, 3.0% from 18 to 24, 26.1% from 25 to 44, 21.6% from 45 to 64, and 24.3% who were 65 years of age or older. The median age was 42 years. For every 100 females, there were 90.1 males. For every 100 females age 18 and over, there were 82.7 males.

The median income for a household in the town was $30,000, and the median income for a family was $31,979. Males had a median income of $27,500 versus $16,696 for females. The per capita income for the town was $12,182. About 13.8% of families and 18.1% of the population were below the poverty line, including 23.3% of those under the age of 18 and 14.5% of those 65 or over.

== Education ==
Goltry shares the Timberlake school district with the nearby towns of Helena, Jet, and Nash.
