= Oklahoma State Highway 58 =

Highway in Oklahoma

State Highway 58

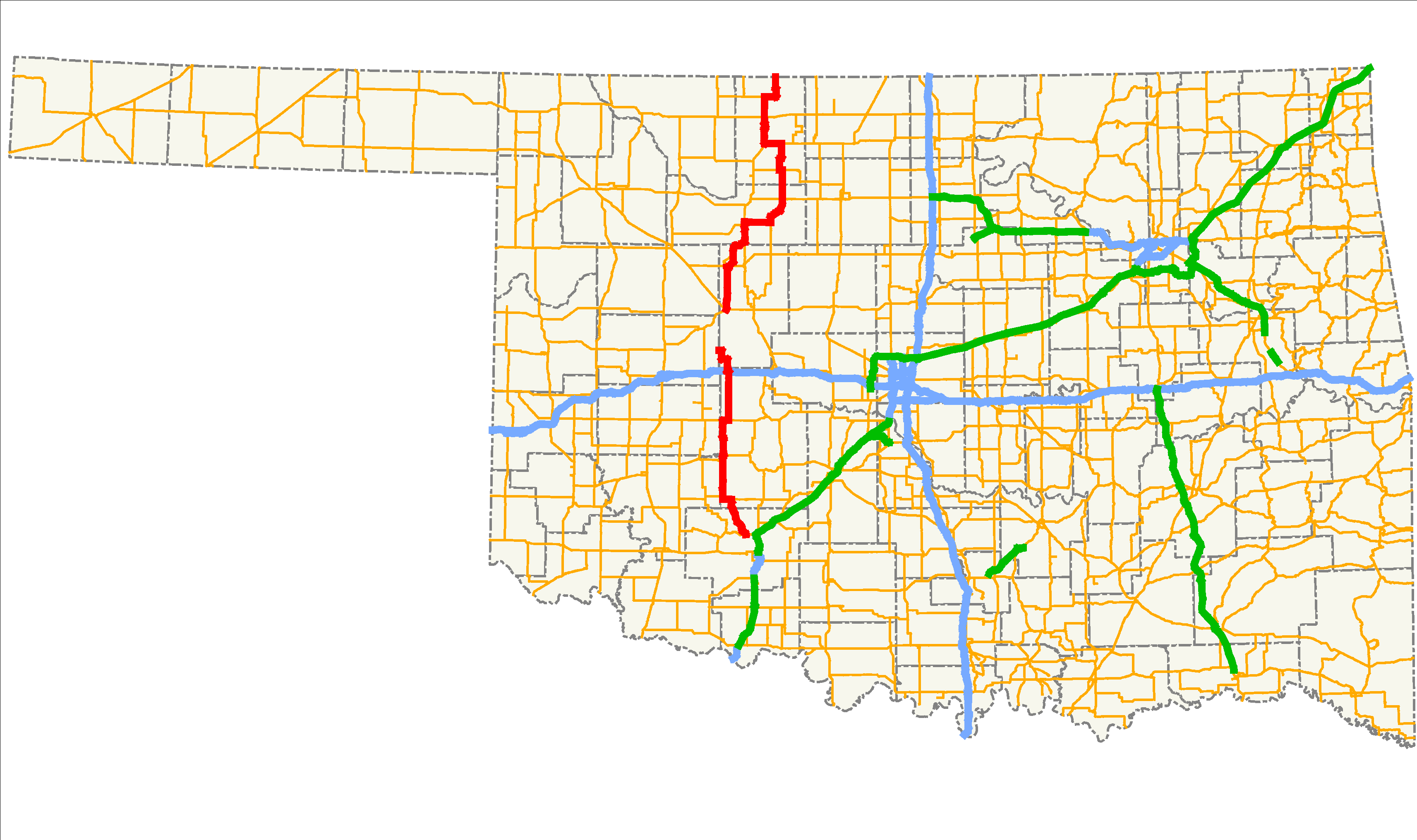

Route information
- Maintained by ODOT
- Existed: c. 1931–present

Section 1
- Length: 72.7 mi (117.0 km)
- South end: SH-49 in Medicine Park
- Major intersections: SH-9 in Carnegie; I-40 in Hydro
- North end: Blaine–Custer county line

Section 2
- Length: 105.9 mi (170.4 km)
- South end: US 270 / US 281 / SH-3 / SH-33 west of Watonga
- Major intersections: US 60 / US 412 in Ringwood; US 64 from Cherokee to Ingersoll
- North end: Kansas state line near Amorita

Location
- Country: United States
- State: Oklahoma

Highway system
- Oklahoma State Highway System; Interstate; US; State; Turnpikes
← SH-56	→ US 59

State Highway 58 (abbreviated SH-58) is the name of two state highways in Oklahoma. One of them runs for 72.7 miles (117.0 km) from Medicine Park to the Blaine–Custer County line near Hydro, and the other connects US-270/281/SH-3/33 to the Kansas state line, a length of 105.9 mi (170.4 km). The northern section has one lettered spur route, SH-58A.

SH-58 was originally a part of US-164. When US-164 was decommissioned in 1930, a section of the road in Major County that was left without a designation became SH-58. Since then, the highway has grown toward both the north and the south. With the designation and extension of the southern section of the highway, SH-58 is present in five counties in the western part of the state.

== Route description ==
=== Southern section ===
The southern SH-58 begins at an intersection with State Highway 49 in Medicine Park in Comanche County. It heads north, passing Lake Lawtonka before meeting State Highway 19, which it overlaps for four miles (6.4 km). After splitting off, it meets State Highway 9 in Carnegie. It passes through the unincorporated community of Alfalfa, after which it has a two-mile (3.2 km) concurrency with State Highway 152.

After splitting from SH-152 near Eakly, SH-58 heads north to an interchange with Interstate 40, then passes through Hydro. Nine miles (14 km) later, it terminates at the Custer County line to become a county road, which eventually connects to State Highway 54.

=== Northern section ===
The northern SH-58 begins at US-270/281/SH-3/33 west of Watonga. It meets State Highway 51 near Canton and continues north through Longdale. In Fairview, the county seat of Major County, it shares a brief concurrency with U.S. Highway 60. Beginning in Fairview and heading east, SH-58 has a concurrency with State Highway 8, with which it switches places (south of the concurrency SH-8 runs to the east of SH-58, and north of it, SH-8 runs to the west of SH-58).

SH-58 continues north, meeting US-60 again near Ringwood. It then has a brief concurrency with State Highway 45 near Helena. Near Jet, it overlaps U.S. Highway 64 and SH-8. North of Cherokee, the Alfalfa County seat, US-64 splits off and State Highway 11 joins the three-route concurrency. North of Driftwood, SH-58 splits off on its own and passes through Byron and Amorita. It terminates at the Kansas state line, where it becomes a county road.

== History ==
SH-58 was first commissioned some time between March 1, 1930, and December 1, 1931. The original extent of the route was much shorter than the present highway. In 1931, SH-58 was a dirt road extending from SH-8 east of Fairview north to Ringwood. Prior to receiving the SH-58 designation, this section of road was part of US-164 and the first SH-13. On May 29, 1930, AASHO approved an extension of US-60 that replaced US-164. When US-60 replaced US-164 through the area, it was changed to the more westerly route it takes in the present day. The section of old U.S. highway that no longer had a designation became SH-58.

Throughout the 1930s, SH-58 was expanded in both directions. The first addition to the highway came during the first half of 1932, when the highway was extended north to Helena. No east–west highway existed at this point yet, leading to a spur end. The highway was extended to the south, replacing SH-44, to Canton on March 29, 1937. SH-58 was extended north to the Kansas state line sometime between April 1937 and April 1938. This final extension brought SH-58's northern section to its present-day termini, and no major changes to the northern section have occurred since.

SH-58's southern section was first established on October 16, 1945, when SH-54 was given a new alignment further to the west; its old alignment was redesignated as SH-58. The original routing of SH-58's southern section began at US-277 in Cyril, continued west through Apache, and turned north at the present-day western intersection with SH-19. SH-58 continued north along its present alignment to Hydro, where it ended at US-66/SH-1.

In 1955, SH-19 was established through southern Caddo County, taking over the east–west section of SH-58. Thus, SH-58 was truncated to where it intersected with SH-19 (the present day western end of their concurrency). SH-58 was extended to its present terminus north of Hydro the next year. The highway was further extended in 1964, bringing the southern terminus to its present location near Medicine Park. No further routing changes have occurred since then.

== SH-58A ==
State Highway 58A
- Location: Blaine County
- Length: 5.33 mi (8.58 km)

SH-58 has one spur, SH-58A, a 5.33-mile (8.58 km) route in Blaine County. The route begins at SH-58 near Longdale, and travels to Canton Lake. There, the highway runs across the dam impounding the lake. The highway then turns south and ends at SH-51 west of Canton.

== Junction list ==
=== Southern section ===
County	Location	mi	km	Destinations	Notes
Comanche	Medicine Park	0.0	0.0	SH-49	Southern section's southern terminus
Caddo		13.5	21.7	SH-19	Eastern end of SH-19 concurrency
Caddo		17.4	28.0	SH-19	Western end of SH-19 concurrency
Caddo	Carnegie	30.4	48.9	SH-9	
Caddo		43.6	70.2	SH-152	Western end of SH-152 concurrency
Caddo		45.4	73.1	SH-152	Eastern end of SH-152 concurrency
Caddo	Hydro	62.6	100.7	I-40	I-40 exit 88. Interchange.
Blaine	No major junctions				
Blaine–Custer county line		72.7	117.0	County Line Road	Southern section's northern terminus
1.000 mi = 1.609 km; 1.000 km = 0.621 mi: Concurrency terminus

=== Northern section ===
County	Location	mi	km	Destinations	Notes
Blaine		0.0	0.0	SH-33 continues south	
Blaine		0.0	0.0	US 270 / US 281 / SH-3	Northern section's southern terminus
Blaine	Canton	14.8	23.8	SH-51	Western end of SH-51 concurrency
Blaine		15.7	25.3	SH-51	Eastern end of SH-51 concurrency
Blaine		19.2	30.9	SH-58A	Northern terminus of SH-58A
Major		27.0	43.5	SH-51A	Northern terminus of SH-51A
Major		32.8	52.8	US 60	Southern end of US-60 concurrency
Major	Fairview	33.8	54.4	US 60 / SH-8	Northern end of US-60 concurrency, western end of SH-8 concurrency
Major		42.8	68.9	SH-8	Eastern end of SH-8 concurrency
Major	Ringwood	52.8	85.0	US 60 / US 412	
Alfalfa		62.8	101.1	SH-45	Eastern end of SH-45 concurrency
Alfalfa	Helena	63.8	102.7	SH-45	Western end of SH-45 concurrency
Alfalfa		73.3	118.0	US 64	Eastern end of US-64 concurrency
Alfalfa		79.1	127.3	SH-8	Southern end of SH-8 concurrency
Alfalfa	Ingersoll	88.2	141.9	US 64 / SH-11	Western end of US-64 concurrency, southern end of SH-11 concurrency
Alfalfa	Driftwood	95.2	153.2	SH-8 / SH-11	Northern end of SH-8/SH-11 concurrency
Oklahoma–Kansas state line		105.9	170.4	SW 140 Avenue (Harper County road) continues north into Kansas	
1.000 mi = 1.609 km; 1.000 km = 0.621 mi: Concurrency terminus
