= Fairview, Oklahoma =

- City
- Motto(s): "A Strong and Proud Community"
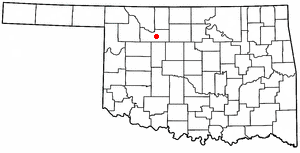
- Location in Oklahoma
- Coordinates: 36°16′14″N 98°28′37″W
- Country: United States
- State: Oklahoma
- County: Major

Area
  - Total: 7.17 sq mi (18.57 km^{2})
  - Land: 7.14 sq mi (18.48 km^{2})
  - Water: 0.035 sq mi (0.09 km^{2})
- Elevation: 1,296 ft (395 m)

Population (2020)
  - Total: 2,740
  - Estimate (2023): 2,661
  - Density: 373/sq mi (144/km^{2})
- Time zone: UTC-6 (Central (CST))
  - Summer (DST): UTC-5 (CDT)
- ZIP Code: 73737
- Area code: 580
- FIPS code: 40-25100
- GNIS feature ID: 2410477
- Website: www.fairviewok.org

Fairview is a city in Major County, Oklahoma, United States. The population was 2,740 at the time of the 2020 Census. It is the county seat of Major County.

== History ==
The first permanent settlers arrived in the area of the present town at the time of the Cherokee Outlet land opening on September 16, 1893. The town received its name from Adam Bower, an early settler, because of its scenic location along the Cimarron River. The Bower family built a wooden building in which they opened a post office on April 18, 1894. One of Adam's sons, Clifford, served as the first postmaster.

The Kansas City, Mexico and Orient Railway (later part of the Atchison, Topeka and Santa Fe Railroad), built a track through Fairview. The first train arrived on August 20, 1903. The railroad soon established machine shops, a roundhouse, and a division office in the town.

The town site was originally within territorial Woods County, but became part of Major County upon its creation at statehood. It was designated as the county seat of Major County, which became permanent after an election December 22, 1908. It beat three competing communities that vied for the title: Cleo Springs, Orienta, and Ringwood. Fairview had 887 residents at statehood, increasing to 2,020 in 1910.

== Geography ==
Fairview is situated east of the geographic center of Major County. U.S. Route 60 passes through the city as Main Street then departs to the west as Cedar Springs Road. US-60 leads north and east 41 miles (66 km) to Enid and west-southwest 31 miles (50 km) to Seiling. State Highway 58 leads south out of Fairview, and State Highway 8 leads to the north; the two highways combine to lead east out of Fairview.

According to the U.S. Census Bureau, the city of Fairview has a total area of 7.17 square miles (18.6 km^{2}), of which 0.04 square miles (0.10 km^{2}), or 0.50%, are water. Sand Creek passes through the southeast part of the city, flowing to the Cimarron River 3 miles (5 km) northeast of the city limits.

== Demographics ==
Historical population
Census	Pop.	Note	%±
1910	2,020		—
1920	1,751		−13.3%
1930	1,887		7.8%
1940	1,913		1.4%
1950	2,411		26.0%
1960	2,213		−8.2%
1970	2,894		30.8%
1980	3,370		16.4%
1990	2,936		−12.9%
2000	2,733		−6.9%
2010	2,579		−5.6%
2020	2,740		6.2%
U.S. Decennial Census

=== 2020 census ===
As of the 2020 census, Fairview had a population of 2,740. The median age was 39.2 years, 26.6% of residents were under the age of 18, and 21.2% of residents were 65 years of age or older. For every 100 females there were 87.0 males, and for every 100 females age 18 and over there were 84.9 males age 18 and over.

0% of residents lived in urban areas, while 100.0% lived in rural areas.

There were 1,085 households in Fairview, of which 34.7% had children under the age of 18 living in them. Of all households, 51.2% were married-couple households, 15.6% were households with a male householder and no spouse or partner present, and 27.7% were households with a female householder and no spouse or partner present. About 28.3% of all households were made up of individuals and 14.3% had someone living alone who was 65 years of age or older.

There were 1,336 housing units, of which 18.8% were vacant. Among occupied housing units, 65.7% were owner-occupied and 34.3% were renter-occupied. The homeowner vacancy rate was 4.2% and the rental vacancy rate was 11.8%.

Racial composition as of the 2020 census
Race	Percent
White	87.3%
Black or African American	0.2%
American Indian and Alaska Native	2.4%
Asian	0.8%
Native Hawaiian and Other Pacific Islander	0%
Some other race	1.5%
Two or more races	7.8%
Hispanic or Latino (of any race)	6.2%

=== 2000 census ===
As of the 2000 census, 2,733 people, 1,131 households, and 762 families were residing in the city. The population density was 390.9 inhabitants per square mile (150.9/km^{2}). The 1,308 housing units averaged 187.1 per square mile (72.2/km^{2}). The racial makeup of the city was 96.74% White, 0.07% African American, 1.24% Native American, 0.11% Asian, 0.26% from other races, and 1.57% from two or more races. Hispanics or Latinos of any race were 1.46% of the population.

Of the 1,131 households, 30.8% had children under 18 living with them, 55.5% were married couples living together, 8.9% had a female householder with no husband present, and 32.6% were not families. About 30.3% of all households were made up of individuals, and 16.4% had someone living alone who was 65 or older. The average household size was 2.31, and the average family size was 2.86.

In the city, the age distribution was 24.1% under 18, 6.9% from 18 to 24, 23.9% from 25 to 44, 22.6% from 45 to 64, and 22.5% who were 65 or older. The median age was 42 years. For every 100 females, there were 86.9 males. For every 100 females age 18 and over, there were 80.3 males.

The median income for a household in the city was $30,136, and for a family was $37,107. Males had a median income of $31,141 versus $17,279 for females. The per capita income for the city was $19,101. About 8.5% of families and 10.9% of the population were below the poverty line, including 16.5% of those under age 18 and 6.4% of those age 65 or over.

== Education ==
Fairview currently has the Fairview Public School system. Fairview has one elementary school that provides prekindergarten through grade five, Cornelson Elementary School; one middle school/junior high that provides grades six through eight, Chamberlin Middle School; and one high school that provides grades 9 through 12, Fairview High School. In addition, Head Start preschool and a pre-K program, and vocational education, are through the Northwest Technology Center. The mascot for Fairview public schools is the Fighting Yellowjacket (Jackets) with school colors of orange and black.

== Notable people ==
- Shirley "S. L." Abbott (1924–2013), Texas legislator and U.S. ambassador
- Clinton Riggs (1910–1997), former assistant police chief of Tulsa
