= Amorita, Oklahoma =

Town in Oklahoma, US

- Town
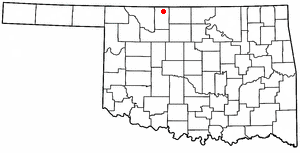
- Location of Amorita, Oklahoma
- Coordinates: 36°55′26″N 98°17′37″W
- Country: United States
- State: Oklahoma
- County: Alfalfa

Area
  - Total: 0.25 sq mi (0.65 km^{2})
  - Land: 0.25 sq mi (0.65 km^{2})
  - Water: 0 sq mi (0.00 km^{2})
- Elevation: 1,207 ft (368 m)

Population (2020)
  - Total: 38
  - Density: 150.4/sq mi (58.07/km^{2})
- Time zone: UTC-6 (Central (CST))
  - Summer (DST): UTC-5 (CDT)
- ZIP code: 73719
- Area code: 580
- FIPS code: 40-02000
- GNIS feature ID: 2412362

Amorita is a town in Alfalfa County, Oklahoma, United States. The population was 38 at the time of the 2020 Census.

== History ==
Amorita was founded in September 1901. It is speculated that Amorita was likely named after the wife of railroad owner, Charles E. Ingersoll. At the time of its founding, the area was part of the much larger Woods county. It did not become part of present-day Alfalfa county until the time of statehood in 1907.

The town was established in Byron township in 1901 approximately two miles north of the existing town of Byron, by what was then known as the Choctaw Northern Railroad, later owned by the Chicago, Rock Island and Pacific. In that year, the railroad became the county's first, connecting Amorita to the other Alfalfa county towns of Aline, Augusta, Ingersoll, Lambert, Driftwood, and on into Kansas. City lots were sold when the railroad completed its rail line through the county in November 1901.

Although the initial sale of lots in November was small, within a month a butcher shop and a coal and grain business were established, and by February of the following year, two grain elevators were also opened. Farming was the predominant economic activity in the area at the time. The town was temporarily given a competitive advantage as a transportation hub because nearby Byron did not acquire its own competing railroad access (the Kansas City, Mexico and Orient Railway) until October 1902.

Residents voted to incorporate their town in May 1912. In 1919 a fifty-thousand-dollar bond was approved to construct a new school building for the consolidated schools of Amorita and two other districts. In 1921, voters of both Byron and Amorita jointly approved the construction of power lines extending from Kansas to supply electricity to both their towns.

The railroad abandoned its line through the town in 1936. In the 1960s, the Amorita school was consolidated into a single entity along with the nearby districts of Burlington, Byron, and Driftwood, which was located in Burlington.

== Geography ==
Amorita lies along State Highway 58, between Byron to the south and the Kansas border to the north.

The town has a total area of 0.26 square miles (0.67 km^{2}), all land, with a population density of 153 people per square mile.

== Demographics ==
Historical population
| Census | Pop. | Note | %± |
|---|---|---|---|
| 1920 | 196 | | — |
| 1930 | 194 | | −1.0% |
| 1940 | 208 | | 7.2% |
| 1950 | 125 | | −39.9% |
| 1960 | 74 | | −40.8% |
| 1970 | 63 | | −14.9% |
| 1980 | 66 | | 4.8% |
| 1990 | 56 | | −15.2% |
| 2000 | 44 | | −21.4% |
| 2010 | 37 | | −15.9% |
| 2020 | 38 | | 2.7% |
U.S. Decennial Census

=== 2020 census ===
As of the 2020 census, Amorita had a population of 38. The median age was 40.5 years. 36.8% of residents were under the age of 18 and 23.7% of residents were 65 years of age or older. For every 100 females there were 72.7 males, and for every 100 females age 18 and over there were 84.6 males age 18 and over.

0.0% of residents lived in urban areas, while 100.0% lived in rural areas.

There were 12 households in Amorita, of which 16.7% had children under the age of 18 living in them. Of all households, 33.3% were married-couple households, 25.0% were households with a male householder and no spouse or partner present, and 33.3% were households with a female householder and no spouse or partner present. About 41.7% of all households were made up of individuals and 41.7% had someone living alone who was 65 years of age or older.

There were 16 housing units, of which 25.0% were vacant. The homeowner vacancy rate was 7.1% and the rental vacancy rate was 0.0%.

Racial composition as of the 2020 census
| Race | Number | Percent |
|---|---|---|
| White | 28 | 73.7% |
| Black or African American | 0 | 0.0% |
| American Indian and Alaska Native | 1 | 2.6% |
| Asian | 0 | 0.0% |
| Native Hawaiian and Other Pacific Islander | 0 | 0.0% |
| Some other race | 0 | 0.0% |
| Two or more races | 9 | 23.7% |
| Hispanic or Latino (of any race) | 1 | 2.6% |

=== 2010 census ===
As of the census of 2010, there were 37 people living in the town. The population density was 172.4 inhabitants per square mile (66.6/km^{2}). There were 19 housing units in the town. The racial makeup of the town was 84.09% White, 6.82% African American, 4.55% Native American, and 4.55% from two or more races. Hispanic or Latino of any race were 2.27% of the population.

There were 14 households in the town, out of which 22.7% had children under the age of 18 living with them, 45.5% were married couples living together, 13.6% had a female householder with no husband present, and 36.4% were non-families. 36.4% of all households were made up of individuals, and 27.3% had someone living alone who was 65 years of age or older. The average household size was 2.00 and the average family size was 2.57.

In the town, the population was spread out, with 22.7% under the age of 18, 6.8% from 18 to 24, 18.2% from 25 to 44, 22.7% from 45 to 64, and 29.5% who were 65 years of age or older. The median age was 46 years. For every 100 females, there were 57.1 males. For every 100 females aged 18 and over, there were 70.0 males.

The median income for a household in the town was $27,500, and the median income for a family was $38,125. Males had a median income of $21,875 versus $30,625 for females. The per capita income for the town was $12,137. There were 15.4% of families and 7.8% of the population living below the poverty line, including no one under the age of eighteen and none of those over 64.
