= Oklahoma State Highway 45 =

State highway in Oklahoma, United States

State Highway 45

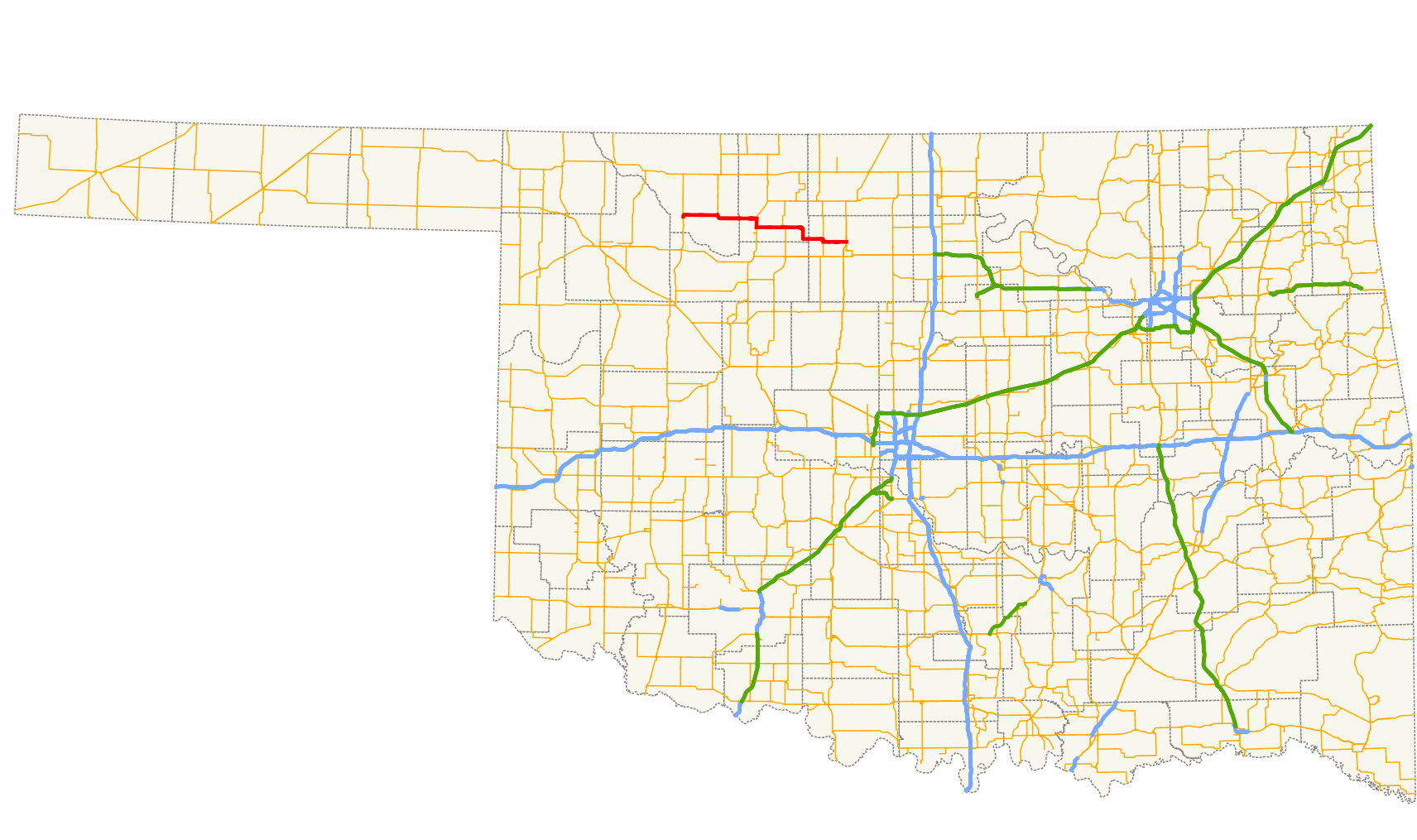

Route information
- Maintained by ODOT
- Length: 64.7 mi (104.1 km)
- Existed: 1926–present

Major junctions
- West end: US 281 / SH-14 in Waynoka
- East end: US 60 / US 64 / US 81 north of Enid

Location
- Country: United States
- State: Oklahoma

Highway system
- Oklahoma State Highway System; Interstate; US; State; Turnpikes
← SH-44	→ SH-46

State Highway 45 (SH-45 or OK-45) is a state highway in Oklahoma. It runs 64.7 miles (104.1 km) west-to-east through Woods, Alfalfa and Garfield counties.

== Route description ==
SH-45 begins at the US-281/SH-14 junction in Waynoka. The first 12 miles (19 km) of SH-45 heading east out of Waynoka is concurrent with US-281. US-281 then splits off to the north. SH-45 continues east for 12 miles (19 km) to Carmen.

Two miles (3.2 km) east of Carmen, SH-45 joins SH-8 for a 3 miles (4.8 km) concurrency to the south, where SH-45 resumes its eastward travel. SH-58 joins SH-45 for a one-mile (1.6 km) concurrency just south of the town of Helena, and at Goltry, SH-45 jogs south a few miles before turning back to the east and heading for a brief concurrency with SH-132 at Carrier. Continuing to the east, SH-45 travels eight more miles (12.9 km) from Carrier, before reaching its terminus at US-60/64/81 at the north edge of Enid.

== History ==
SH-45 was first added to the state highway system between May 1926 and November 1927. The original routing of the highway was from Waynoka to SH-8 in Carmen.

Before 1963, the section of present-day SH-45 between SH-58 and SH-132 was part of the original SH-38. In 1963, all of this SH-38 west of Carrier was renumbered to SH-45 (a north–south section of SH-38 that connected Carrier to US-60 became part of a SH-132 extension). The same year, SH-45 was extended westward to Waynoka. In either 1971 or 1972, the highway was extended eastward to its present terminus on the northern outskirts of Enid. No major changes have occurred since.

== Junction list ==
County	Location	mi	km	Destinations	Notes
Woods	Waynoka	0.0	0.0	US 281 / SH-14	Western terminus (SH-45 begins concurrent with US-281), southern terminus of SH-14.
Woods		12.1	19.5	US 281	Eastern end of US-281 concurrency
Alfalfa		26.1	42.0	SH-8	Northern end of SH-8 concurrency
Alfalfa		29.1	46.8	SH-8	Southern end of SH-8 concurrency
Alfalfa	Helena	38.1	61.3	SH-58	Western end of SH-58 concurrency
Alfalfa		39.1	62.9	SH-58	Eastern end of SH-58 concurrency
Garfield	Carrier	56.0	90.1	SH-132	Northern end of SH-132 concurrency
Garfield	Carrier	56.8	91.4	SH-132	Southern end of SH-132 concurrency
Garfield	Enid	64.7	104.1	US 60 / US 64 / US 81	Eastern terminus
1.000 mi = 1.609 km; 1.000 km = 0.621 mi: Concurrency terminus
