= Alfalfa County, Oklahoma =

County in Oklahoma, United States

- County
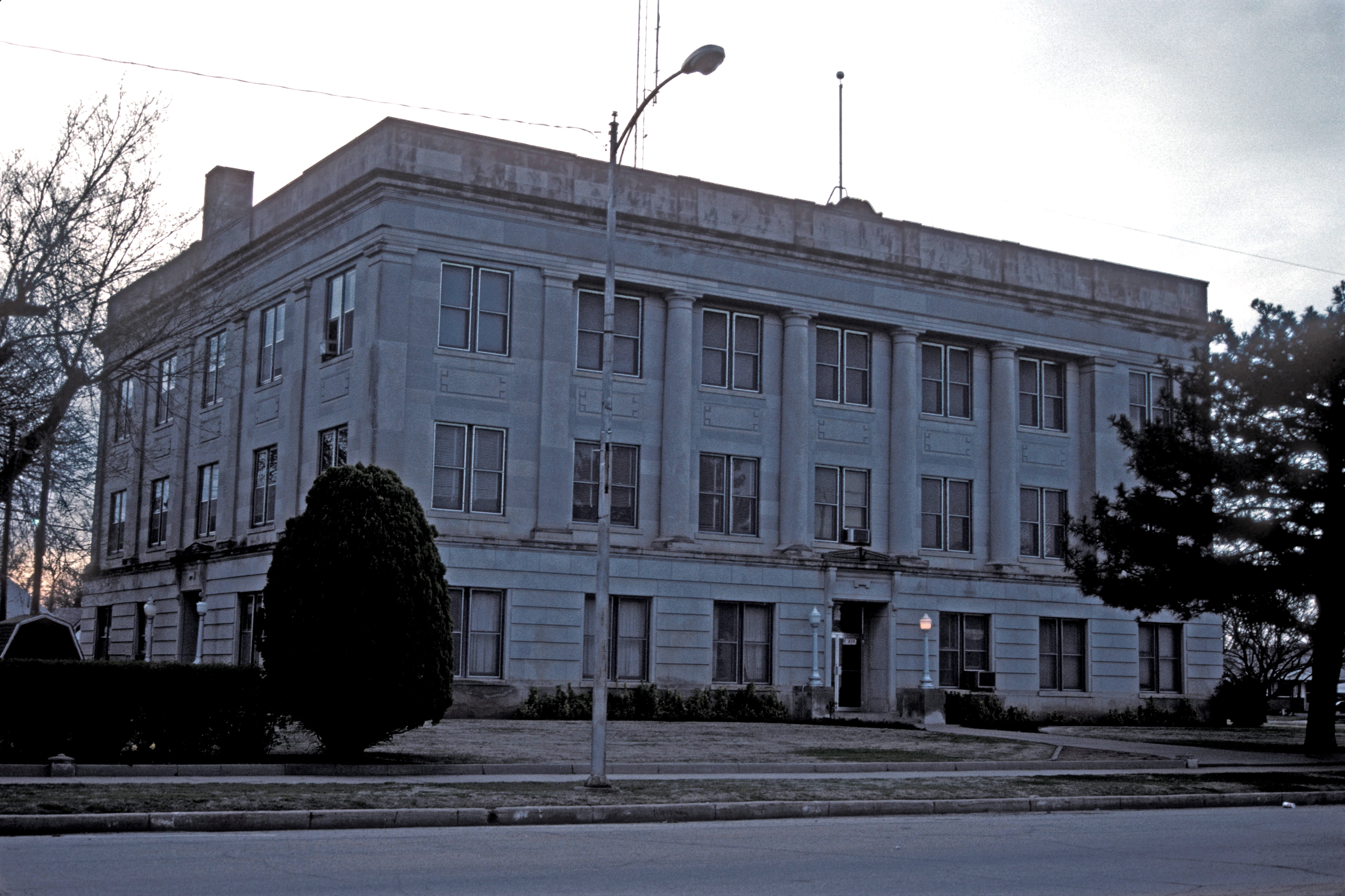
- Alfalfa County Courthouse in Cherokee in 2007

- Location within the U.S. state of Oklahoma
- Coordinates: 36°44′N 98°19′W
- Country: United States
- State: Oklahoma
- Founded: 1907
- Named for: William H. "Alfalfa Bill" Murray
- Seat: Cherokee
- Largest city: Helena

Area
  - Total: 881 sq mi (2,280 km^{2})
  - Land: 866 sq mi (2,240 km^{2})
  - Water: 15 sq mi (39 km^{2}) 1.7%

Population (2020)
  - Total: 5,699
  - Estimate (2025): 5,649 ▼
  - Density: 6.5/sq mi (2.5/km^{2})
- Time zone: UTC−6 (Central)
  - Summer (DST): UTC−5 (CDT)
- Congressional district: 3rd
- Website: https://alfalfa.okcounties.org/

Alfalfa County is a county located in the U.S. state of Oklahoma. As of the 2020 census, the population was 5,699. The county seat is Cherokee.

Alfalfa County was formed at statehood in 1907 from Woods County. The county is named after both the alfalfa crops grown there and William H. "Alfalfa Bill" Murray, the president of the Oklahoma Constitutional Convention and ninth governor of Oklahoma. He was instrumental creating the county from the original, much larger Woods County.

== History ==
=== Early history ===
Indigenous peoples inhabited and hunted in this area for thousands of years. By 1750, the Osage had become a dominant tribe in the area. About one third belonged to the band led by Chief Black Dog (Manka - Chonka). Before 1800 they made the Black Dog Trail starting east of Baxter Springs, Kansas and heading southwest to their summer hunting grounds at the Great Salt Plains in present-day Alfalfa County. The Osage stopped at the springs, which attracted migratory birds and varieties of wildlife, for its healing properties on their way to hunting on the plains. The Osage name for this fork of the Arkansas River was Nescatunga (big salt water), what European-Americans later called the Salt Fork. The Osage cleared the trail of brush and large rocks, and made ramps at the fords. Wide enough for eight men riding horses abreast, the trail was the first improved road in Kansas and Oklahoma.

=== Pre-statehood ===
The treaties of 1828 and 1835 placed what would later become Alfalfa County within the Cherokee Outlet, which was owned by the Cherokee Nation. Ranching became the primary economic activity from 1870 to 1890; cattle companies that belonged to the Cherokee Strip Live Stock Association leased grazing land from the Cherokee. Prominent rancher, Major Andrew Drumm operated the "U Ranch" here as early as 1870. Its headquarters were southeast of Driftwood on the Medicine Lodge and Salt Fork rivers.

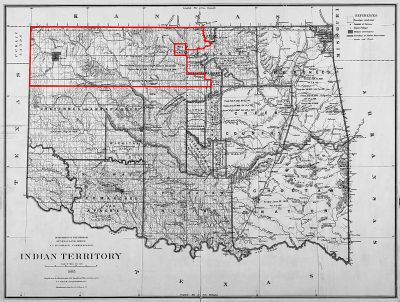
The Cherokee Outlet (1885)

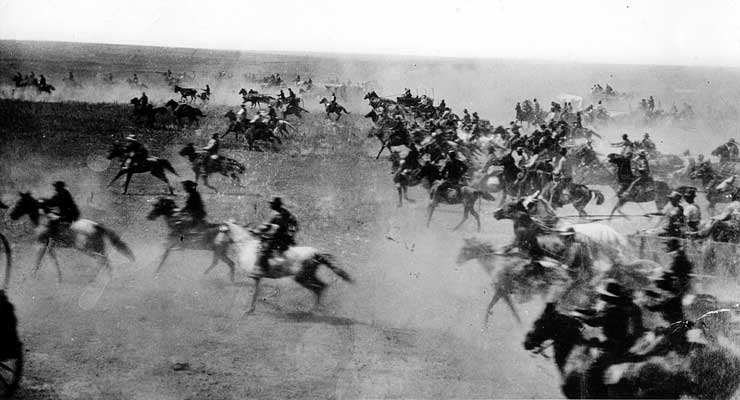
An Oklahoma Land Rush (1889)

Woods County was created in September 1893 at the same time as the opening of the Cherokee Outlet with the Cherokee Strip Land Run. As population increased and Cherokee land titles were extinguished, the legislature authorized the creation of Alfalfa County in 1907, as part of statehood. The county was named after William H. "Alfalfa Bill" Murray, who served as the president of the Oklahoma Constitutional Convention and would later be elected as the ninth governor of Oklahoma. He promoted creation of this county.

=== Statehood years onward ===
The city of Cherokee was designated as the county seat after being chosen by voters in an election held in January 1909. Other towns receiving votes for the honor were Carmen, Ingersoll, and Jet.

Alfalfa County's population was primarily of European-American ancestry. European immigrants and their children were numerous in the early 1900s. Germans from Russia (ethnic Germans who immigrated to American from Russia), many of whom were Mennonites, settled near Ingersoll, Driftwood, Cherokee, and Goltry. Early censuses also reveal a considerable number of Bohemians from the Austro-Hungary Empire. At the turn of the twenty-first century, nearly 17 percent of county residents claimed German ancestry on the census. One Mennonite church (in Goltry) remained as of 2006.

Early railroad construction, from the Choctaw Northern line (1901), the Kansas City, Mexico and Orient (1901), the Arkansas Valley and Western (1904), and the Denver, Enid and Gulf Railroad Company (1904), contributed greatly to the county's early prosperity and caused many small towns to flourish. They would compete as wheat-shipping points and agribusiness centers for many years thereafter. However, by 2000 only one rail line, the Burlington Northern Santa Fe, served the county.

Petroleum exploration and production has been a contributor to Alfalfa County's economy since the time of statehood. Agricultural pursuits, including wheat farming and livestock raising, were major contributors to Alfalfa County's economy during the twentieth century. Small-scale agriculture in its early years supported dozens of towns and dispersed rural communities, many of which no longer exist as a result of transportation and economic changes. After construction of railroads, those towns bypassed by rail service, such as Carroll, Carwile, Keith, and Timberlake, did not prosper for long.

Restructuring of the railroad industry in the late 20th century resulted in abandonment of other lines, and towns such as Ingersoll and Driftwood, for example, had declining populations that made it difficult to sustain educational and city services. Ingersoll (founded 1901) peaked in 1910 with 253 inhabitants and Driftwood (founded 1898) in 1930 with 71. By 1980, neither of these towns was still incorporated. Aline, Amorita, Burlington, Byron, Carmen, Cherokee, Goltry, Helena, Jet, and Lambert remained incorporated as of 2000.

== Economy ==
The largely rural economy is based on agricultural and energy production. Agriculture has altered to be based in industrial-scale farms and production. The county is the second-largest producer of winter wheat in Oklahoma. The USDA estimated the county's winter wheat production at 5,957,000 bushels for 2015. The USDA also listed the county as the state's seventh-largest producer of sorghum in 2015, at 702,000 bushels.

Alfalfa County remains a major producer of petroleum and natural gas. In 2012, it was second (surpassed only by neighboring Woods County) in production of natural gas for Oklahoma counties, with an output of 419,606,514 Mcf (thousand cubic feet). It is also a major producer of crude oil, with total output of 3,395,396 barrels in 2012, which was fifth among Oklahoma counties.

== Geography ==
According to the U.S. Census Bureau, the county has a total area of 881 square miles (2,280 km^{2}), of which 866 square miles (2,240 km^{2}) is land and 15 square miles (39 km^{2}) (1.7%) is water. The Great Salt Plains Lake, as well as the associated Great Salt Plains State Park and Great Salt Plains National Wildlife Refuge lie within the county, approximately 12 miles east of Cherokee. The major waterways in the county are the Salt Fork of the Arkansas River and the Medicine Lodge River.

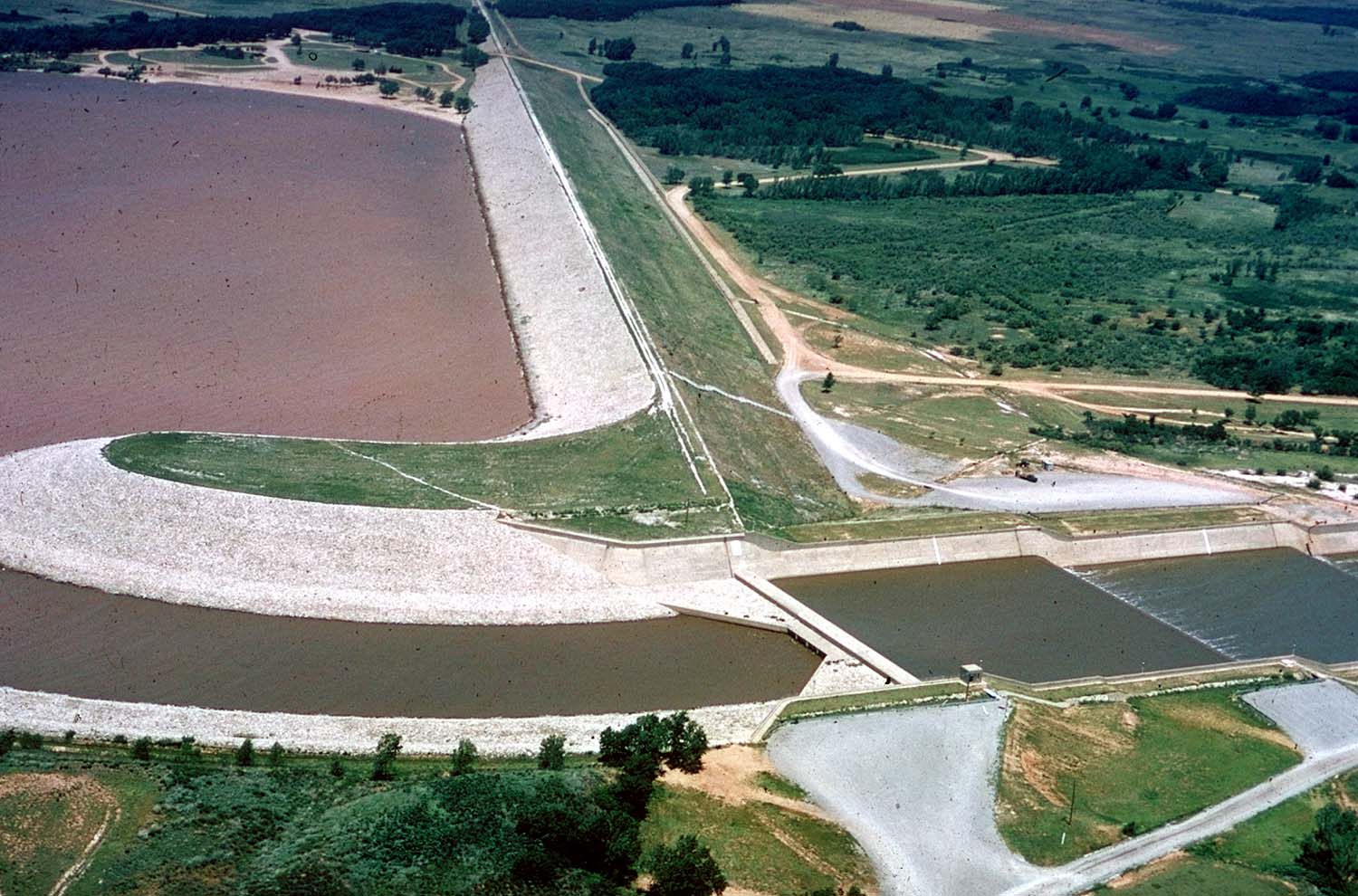
Aerial view to the northwest of the Great Salt Plains Lake Dam on the Salt Fork of the Arkansas River in Alfalfa County, OK. The dam was constructed by the U.S. Army Corps of Engineers.

It is part of the Red Bed plains.

=== Major highways ===
- U.S. Highway 64
- State Highway 8
- State Highway 8B
- State Highway 11
- State Highway 38
- State Highway 45
- State Highway 58

=== Adjacent counties ===
- Harper County, Kansas (northeast)
- Grant County (east)
- Garfield County (southeast)
- Major County (south)
- Woods County (west)
- Barber County, Kansas (northwest)

=== National protected area ===
- Salt Plains National Wildlife Refuge

=== State Park ===
- Great Salt Plains State Park

== Demographics ==
Historical population
Census	Pop.	Note	%±
1910	18,138		—
1920	16,253		−10.4%
1930	15,228		−6.3%
1940	14,129		−7.2%
1950	10,699		−24.3%
1960	8,445		−21.1%
1970	7,224		−14.5%
1980	7,077		−2.0%
1990	6,416		−9.3%
2000	6,105		−4.8%
2010	5,642		−7.6%
2020	5,699		1.0%
2025 (est.)	5,649	▼	−0.9%
U.S. Decennial Census; 1790-1960 1900-1990; 1990-2000 2010

=== 2020 census ===
As of the 2020 census, the county had a population of 5,699. Of the residents, 20.0% were under the age of 18 and 18.5% were 65 years of age or older; the median age was 44.6 years. For every 100 females there were 153.6 males, and for every 100 females age 18 and over there were 167.3 males.

The racial makeup of the county was 83.7% White, 4.2% Black or African American, 3.4% American Indian and Alaska Native, 0.1% Asian, 2.4% from some other race, and 6.2% from two or more races. Hispanic or Latino residents of any race comprised 4.9% of the population.

There were 1,895 households in the county, of which 29.3% had children under the age of 18 living with them and 21.8% had a female householder with no spouse or partner present. About 30.2% of all households were made up of individuals and 15.7% had someone living alone who was 65 years of age or older.

There were 2,479 housing units, of which 23.6% were vacant. Among occupied housing units, 76.7% were owner-occupied and 23.3% were renter-occupied. The homeowner vacancy rate was 2.4% and the rental vacancy rate was 16.2%.

=== 2010 census ===
As of the 2010 census, Alfalfa County had a population of 5,642 people, down from 6,105 people in 2000. Most of the population (89.1%) self-identified as white. Black or African American individuals made up 4.7% of the population and Native Americans made up 2.9% of the population. Less than 1% of the population was Asian.

The median age of the population was 46 years and 18% of the county's population was under the age of 18. Individuals 65 years of age or older accounted for 20.2% of the population.

There were a total of 2,022 households and 1,333 families in the county in 2010. There were 2,763 housing units. Of the 2,022 households, 23.4 percent included children under the age of 18 and slightly more than half (56.3%) included married couples living together. Non-family households accounted for 34.1% of households. The average household size was 2.27 and the average family size was 2.81.

The median income for a household in the county was $42,730, and the median income for a family was $56,444. The per capita income for the county was $24,080. About 7 percent of families and 11 percent of the population were below the poverty line, including 7.4 percent of those age 65 or over.

== Life expectancy and health ==
Of 3,142 counties in the United States in 2014, the Institute for Health Metrics and Evaluation ranked Alfalfa County 840 in the average life expectancy at birth of male residents and 1,999 in the average life expectancy of female residents. Males in Alfalfa County lived an average of 77.2 years and females lived an average of 79.6 years compared to the national average for life expectancy of 76.7 for males and 81.5 for females. In 2014, Alfalfa Country was one of only two counties in Oklahoma (the other being Logan County) in which males had a longer life expectancy than the national average. However, women had a shorter life expectancy than the national average. In the 1980-2014 period, the average life expectancy in Alfalfa County for females increased by 1.1 years while male longevity increased by 3.5 years compared to the national average for the same period of an increased life expectancy of 4.0 years for women and 6.7 years for men.

In 2020, the Robert Wood Johnson Foundation ranked Alfalfa country as first among 77 counties in Oklahoma in "health outcomes," as measured by length and quality of life.

== Notable people born in Alfalfa County ==
- R. Orin Cornett (1913 – 2002), physicist, was born in Driftwood. He earned a doctorate of physics and applied mathematics from the University of Texas in 1940, and invented the communication system for the hearing impaired known as Cued Speech. He taught at Oklahoma Baptist University, Pennsylvania State University, and Harvard University. He also served as a vice president at Oklahoma Baptist and as the Vice President of Long Range Planning for Gallaudet University.
- Beryl Clark (1917 – 2000), born in Cherokee. Clark was a football player with the Oklahoma Sooners who was selected as a second-team halfback on the 1939 College Football All-America Team. Clark was drafted by the Chicago Cardinals in the 1940 NFL draft and played for the Cardinals during the 1940 NFL season.
- Harold Keith (1903 – 1998), born in Lambert. He earned a master's degree in history and became the University of Oklahoma's first sports publicist from 1930 to 1969. He was awarded the 1958 Newbery Medal for his historical novel Rifles for Watie, which is based on the interviews he did for his Master's thesis. Keith was a 1987 inductee into the Oklahoma Sports Hall of Fame (now a part of the Jim Thorpe Association).
- Harold G. Kiner (1924 – 1944), was born in Aline. As a private in the US Army during World War II, he received the U. S. military's highest decoration — the Medal of Honor — for his heroic actions.
- Wallace "Wally" Parks (1913 – 2007) was born in Goltry. Parks was founder in 1951, chairman and president of the National Hot Rod Association, better known as NHRA. It helped establish drag racing as a legitimate amateur and professional motorsport. In 1948, he was named editor of Hot Rod magazine. Parks was inducted into the International Motorsports Hall of Fame in 1992 and the Motorsports Hall of Fame of America in 1993.

== Politics ==
Voter Registration and Party Enrollment as of May 31, 2023
Party	Number of Voters	Percentage
Democratic	356	12.38%
Republican	2,290	77.83%
Others	296	10.06%
Total	2,942	100%

United States presidential election results for Alfalfa County, Oklahoma
Year	Republican		Democratic		Third party(ies)	
Year	No.	%	No.	%	No.	%
1908	1,738	51.37%	1,459	43.13%	186	5.50%
1912	1,714	50.74%	1,179	34.90%	485	14.36%
1916	1,378	41.58%	1,390	41.94%	546	16.48%
1920	3,005	63.71%	1,350	28.62%	362	7.67%
1924	2,967	57.27%	1,558	30.07%	656	12.66%
1928	4,224	77.98%	1,086	20.05%	107	1.98%
1932	2,037	35.87%	3,642	64.13%	0	0.00%
1936	2,573	42.70%	3,398	56.39%	55	0.91%
1940	3,675	56.93%	2,720	42.14%	60	0.93%
1944	3,434	66.27%	1,716	33.11%	32	0.62%
1948	2,765	60.07%	1,838	39.93%	0	0.00%
1952	4,155	78.80%	1,118	21.20%	0	0.00%
1956	3,251	70.34%	1,371	29.66%	0	0.00%
1960	3,332	75.74%	1,067	24.26%	0	0.00%
1964	2,450	58.61%	1,730	41.39%	0	0.00%
1968	2,672	69.46%	865	22.49%	310	8.06%
1972	3,208	81.48%	641	16.28%	88	2.24%
1976	2,113	54.22%	1,725	44.26%	59	1.51%
1980	2,628	72.16%	899	24.68%	115	3.16%
1984	2,715	75.25%	866	24.00%	27	0.75%
1988	1,960	62.58%	1,117	35.66%	55	1.76%
1992	1,567	51.46%	741	24.33%	737	24.20%
1996	1,504	56.48%	796	29.89%	363	13.63%
2000	1,886	75.23%	583	23.25%	38	1.52%
2004	2,201	82.40%	470	17.60%	0	0.00%
2008	2,023	83.11%	411	16.89%	0	0.00%
2012	1,761	84.54%	322	15.46%	0	0.00%
2016	1,933	85.61%	216	9.57%	109	4.83%
2020	1,978	87.44%	232	10.26%	52	2.30%
2024	1,891	87.55%	236	10.93%	33	1.53%

== Communities ==
=== City ===
- Cherokee (county seat)

=== Towns ===
- Aline
- Amorita
- Burlington
- Byron
- Carmen
- Goltry
- Helena
- Jet
- Lambert

=== Census-designated place ===
- Nescatunga

=== Other unincorporated places ===
- Ashley
- Driftwood
- Ingersoll
- Yewed

== NRHP sites ==
The following sites in Alfalfa County are listed on the National Register of Historic Places:

- Alfalfa County Courthouse, Cherokee
- Aline IOOF Lodge No. 263, Aline
- Carmen IOOF Home, Carmen
- Carmen IOOF Lodge No. 84, Carmen
- Cherokee Armory, Cherokee
- Cherokee Friends Church, Cherokee
- Cherokee IOOF Lodge No. 219, Cherokee
- Farmers' Exchange Elevator, Goltry
- Farmers' Federation Elevator, Cherokee
- Hotel Cherokee, Cherokee
- Ingersoll Tile Elevator, Ingersoll
- Sod House, Cleo Springs
