= Helena, Oklahoma =

Town in Oklahoma, US

- Town
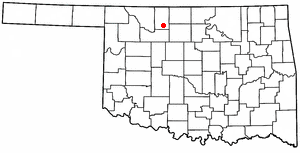
- Location of Helena, Oklahoma
- Coordinates: 36°32′47″N 98°16′19″W
- Country: United States
- State: Oklahoma
- County: Alfalfa

Area
  - Total: 0.41 sq mi (1.06 km^{2})
  - Land: 0.41 sq mi (1.06 km^{2})
  - Water: 0 sq mi (0.00 km^{2})
- Elevation: 1,401 ft (427 m)

Population (2020)
  - Total: 1,537
  - Density: 3,768.9/sq mi (1,455.18/km^{2})
- Time zone: UTC-6 (Central (CST))
  - Summer (DST): UTC-5 (CDT)
- ZIP code: 73741
- Area code: 580
- FIPS code: 40-33450
- GNIS feature ID: 2412743

Helena is a town in southeastern Alfalfa County, Oklahoma, United States. Residents pronounce the town's name with a long E: "Heh-LEE'-nuh." As of the 2020 census, Helena had a population of 1,537.

== History ==
In June 1915, Helen S. Monroe received a postal designation for Helena. Monroe became the first postmaster and the town's namesake.

Shortly after the Cherokee Outlet opened to settlement, numerous small communities emerged in what was then southwestern Woods County (now Alfalfa county). When the Arkansas Valley and Western Railway survey bypassed the nearby settlement of Carwile, those residents began migrating closer to the proposed railroad, near where H. H. Anderson had established a store around 1896. The townsite was laid out nearby in 1902, and the village was incorporated the following year, by which time the population was 160.

The Woods County High School, one of only two in Oklahoma Territory at that time, was constructed in 1903 and opened in 1904 with 400 students. On January 6, 1904, the Arkansas Valley and Western Railway (part of the St. Louis and San Francisco Railway system) reached Helena. Growing fast, by mid-1905 it was estimated that 700 residents supported two banks, two schools, two newspapers, four grain elevators, a flour mill, and two lumberyards. By 1909, there were Baptist, Christian, Methodist, and Presbyterian churches. The 1910 census showed 760 residents, a number which had increased to 776 by 1940.

=== Mammoth ===
In July 2013, the remains of a mammoth were found two miles northwest of Helena by workers of Access Midstream, a natural gas provider, on land owned by brothers Dr. Michael Thorp and Tom Thorp. Oklahoma State University geographer Carlos Cordova, and geography doctoral student Tom Cox excavated the site from September 2013 until October 2013. Oklahoma State University has plans to display the mammoth, which was donated by the Thorp's.

== Geography ==
According to the United States Census Bureau, the town has a total area of 0.5 square miles (1.3 km^{2}), all land.

Helena lies along State Highway 58.

=== Climate ===
According to the Köppen Climate Classification system, Helena has a humid subtropical climate, abbreviated "Cfa" on climate maps. The hottest temperature recorded in Helena was 113 °F (45.0 °C) on June 25, 1911, and July 30, 1986, while the coldest temperature recorded was −21 °F (−29.4 °C) on February 10, 2011.

Climate data for Helena, Oklahoma, 1991–2020 normals, extremes 1906–present
Month	Jan	Feb	Mar	Apr	May	Jun	Jul	Aug	Sep	Oct	Nov	Dec	Year
Record high °F (°C)	82 (28)	92 (33)	99 (37)	99 (37)	105 (41)	113 (45)	113 (45)	112 (44)	108 (42)	98 (37)	91 (33)	80 (27)	113 (45)
Mean maximum °F (°C)	69.5 (20.8)	74.9 (23.8)	82.1 (27.8)	87.3 (30.7)	93.9 (34.4)	99.9 (37.7)	104.5 (40.3)	103.4 (39.7)	98.4 (36.9)	90.4 (32.4)	78.5 (25.8)	68.5 (20.3)	105.9 (41.1)
Mean daily maximum °F (°C)	46.8 (8.2)	51.0 (10.6)	61.0 (16.1)	70.2 (21.2)	79.5 (26.4)	89.7 (32.1)	95.0 (35.0)	93.2 (34.0)	85.3 (29.6)	72.7 (22.6)	59.1 (15.1)	48.1 (8.9)	71.0 (21.6)
Daily mean °F (°C)	35.1 (1.7)	38.7 (3.7)	48.2 (9.0)	57.2 (14.0)	67.6 (19.8)	77.8 (25.4)	82.7 (28.2)	80.9 (27.2)	73.0 (22.8)	60.1 (15.6)	47.1 (8.4)	37.1 (2.8)	58.8 (14.9)
Mean daily minimum °F (°C)	23.3 (−4.8)	26.5 (−3.1)	35.5 (1.9)	44.2 (6.8)	55.7 (13.2)	65.8 (18.8)	70.3 (21.3)	68.7 (20.4)	60.6 (15.9)	47.5 (8.6)	35.0 (1.7)	26.0 (−3.3)	46.6 (8.1)
Mean minimum °F (°C)	7.3 (−13.7)	9.9 (−12.3)	17.9 (−7.8)	28.0 (−2.2)	39.9 (4.4)	54.1 (12.3)	61.5 (16.4)	59.0 (15.0)	45.7 (7.6)	29.9 (−1.2)	18.3 (−7.6)	9.8 (−12.3)	1.7 (−16.8)
Record low °F (°C)	−14 (−26)	−21 (−29)	−1 (−18)	1 (−17)	29 (−2)	44 (7)	50 (10)	48 (9)	31 (−1)	12 (−11)	5 (−15)	−15 (−26)	−21 (−29)
Average precipitation inches (mm)	1.04 (26)	1.25 (32)	2.22 (56)	3.27 (83)	4.37 (111)	4.42 (112)	3.22 (82)	3.71 (94)	2.56 (65)	3.03 (77)	1.60 (41)	1.45 (37)	32.14 (816)
Average snowfall inches (cm)	3.1 (7.9)	2.4 (6.1)	3.2 (8.1)	0.0 (0.0)	0.0 (0.0)	0.0 (0.0)	0.0 (0.0)	0.0 (0.0)	0.0 (0.0)	0.2 (0.51)	0.4 (1.0)	3.4 (8.6)	12.7 (32.21)
Average precipitation days (≥ 0.01 in)	3.9	4.8	6.3	7.5	9.2	8.1	6.5	8.0	6.1	6.2	4.6	4.8	76.0
Average snowy days (≥ 0.1 in)	1.6	1.6	0.9	0.0	0.0	0.0	0.0	0.0	0.0	0.2	0.2	1.7	6.2
Source 1: NOAA
Source 2: National Weather Service

== Demographics ==
Historical population
Census	Pop.	Note	%±
1910	760		—
1920	615		−19.1%
1930	735		19.5%
1940	776		5.6%
1950	484		−37.6%
1960	580		19.8%
1970	769		32.6%
1980	710		−7.7%
1990	1,043		46.9%
2000	443		−57.5%
2010	1,403		216.7%
2020	1,537		9.6%
U.S. Decennial Census

=== 2020 census ===
As of the 2020 census, Helena had a population of 1,537. The median age was 47.2 years. 7.0% of residents were under the age of 18 and 12.0% of residents were 65 years of age or older. For every 100 females there were 688.2 males, and for every 100 females age 18 and over there were 900.0 males age 18 and over.

0.0% of residents lived in urban areas, while 100.0% lived in rural areas.

There were 159 households in Helena, of which 32.7% had children under the age of 18 living in them. Of all households, 54.7% were married-couple households, 16.4% were households with a male householder and no spouse or partner present, and 26.4% were households with a female householder and no spouse or partner present. About 27.6% of all households were made up of individuals and 15.7% had someone living alone who was 65 years of age or older.

There were 188 housing units, of which 15.4% were vacant. The homeowner vacancy rate was 3.1% and the rental vacancy rate was 16.3%.

Racial composition as of the 2020 census
Race	Number	Percent
White	1,055	68.6%
Black or African American	225	14.6%
American Indian and Alaska Native	125	8.1%
Asian	3	0.2%
Native Hawaiian and Other Pacific Islander	0	0.0%
Some other race	88	5.7%
Two or more races	41	2.7%
Hispanic or Latino (of any race)	97	6.3%

=== 2000 census ===
As of the census of 2000, there were 443 people, 177 households, and 120 families residing in the town. The population density was 1,183.7 inhabitants per square mile (457.0/km^{2}). There were 211 housing units at an average density of 563.8 per square mile (217.7/km^{2}). The racial makeup of the town was 94.58% White, 0.45% African American, 1.35% Native American, 0.45% from other races, and 3.16% from two or more races. Hispanic or Latino of any race were 1.81% of the population.

There were 177 households, out of which 31.6% had children under the age of 18 living with them, 57.1% were married couples living together, 7.3% had a female householder with no husband present, and 32.2% were non-families. 29.4% of all households were made up of individuals, and 14.7% had someone living alone who was 65 years of age or older. The average household size was 2.36 and the average family size was 2.90.

In the town, the population was spread out, with 24.8% under the age of 18, 7.2% from 18 to 24, 21.2% from 25 to 44, 23.7% from 45 to 64, and 23.0% who were 65 years of age or older. The median age was 42 years. For every 100 females, there were 75.8 males. For every 100 females age 18 and over, there were 79.0 males.

The median income for a household in the town was $31,705, and the median income for a family was $36,528. Males had a median income of $26,563 versus $18,839 for females. The per capita income for the town was $14,985. About 9.9% of families and 8.6% of the population were below the poverty line, including 10.8% of those under age 18 and 5.1% of those age 65 or over.

== Economy ==
It is the site of the James Crabtree Correctional Center, run by the Oklahoma Department of Corrections, with a population of 1,003 inmates in 2010.

== Education ==
Helena is the site of the Timberlake Public School district's high school, shared with the nearby towns of Goltry, Jet, Nash, and Nescutunga.
