= Burlington, Oklahoma =

Town in Oklahoma, US

- Town
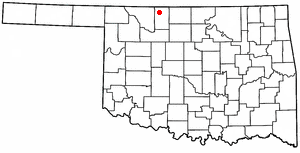
- Location of Burlington, Oklahoma
- Coordinates: 36°54′01″N 98°25′24″W
- Country: United States
- State: Oklahoma
- County: Alfalfa

Area
  - Total: 0.27 sq mi (0.71 km^{2})
  - Land: 0.27 sq mi (0.71 km^{2})
  - Water: 0 sq mi (0.00 km^{2})
- Elevation: 1,217 ft (371 m)

Population (2020)
  - Total: 124
  - Density: 455.0/sq mi (175.66/km^{2})
- Time zone: UTC-6 (Central (CST))
  - Summer (DST): UTC-5 (CDT)
- ZIP code: 73722
- Area code: 580
- FIPS code: 40-10050
- GNIS feature ID: 2411744

Burlington is a town in northwestern Alfalfa County, Oklahoma, United States. As of the 2020 census, Burlington had a population of 124.

== History ==
Originally the town of Burlington was named "Drumm", for prominent cattle rancher Major Andrew Drumm. Major Drumm had operated the 150,000 acre U Ranch in the area from 1874 until 1888 on land leased from the Cherokees and was a founder of the Cherokee Strip Live Stock Association. Drumm was also the founder of the Andrew Drumm Institute in Independence Missouri.

Its post office was established under the name Drumm on June 6, 1906. But when the initial plans in July 1907 to rename the town "Wheaton" fell through, the town's name was officially changed to Burlington on August 21 of that year, which it remains to this day.

A member-owned agricultural cooperative called Burlington Grain Company was formed in 1916. It currently operates as Burlington Cooperative Association. The elevator at Burlington has a capacity of 1,774,000 bushels. A second facility in nearby Amorita has storage space of 342,000 bushels.

Alfalfa County's first consolidated school was organized in Burlington in April 1908. The following year, the first school building was completed. By 1913, it had 150 students and four teachers. A two-story brick building was constructed in 1923. In 1948 a new gymnasium was added. In the 1960s, the schools of Burlington, Driftwood, Byron, and Amorita consolidated into a single school district, located in Burlington. In 1963 a new school building was built. Many additions have been added since that time – the most recent being a band room and agriculture shop addition in 2014. Also in 2014, there were approximately 150 (pre-K-12th) students.

== Geography ==
Burlington lies along State Highway 8/11.

The town has a total area of 0.27 square miles (0.70 km^{2}), all land, with a 2014 estimated population of 158, yielding a population density of 575 people per square mile.

As of March, 2016, the cost of living index in Burlington was 78.5 (U.S. average is 100).

== Demographics ==
Historical population
Census	Pop.	Note	%±
1910	135		—
1920	169		25.2%
1930	166		−1.8%
1940	177		6.6%
1950	181		2.3%
1960	174		−3.9%
1970	165		−5.2%
1980	206		24.8%
1990	169		−18.0%
2000	156		−7.7%
2010	152		−2.6%
2020	124		−18.4%
U.S. Decennial Census

=== 2020 census ===
As of the 2020 census, Burlington had a population of 124. The median age was 33.0 years. 31.5% of residents were under the age of 18 and 19.4% of residents were 65 years of age or older. For every 100 females there were 103.3 males, and for every 100 females age 18 and over there were 93.2 males age 18 and over.

0.0% of residents lived in urban areas, while 100.0% lived in rural areas.

There were 49 households in Burlington, of which 28.6% had children under the age of 18 living in them. Of all households, 55.1% were married-couple households, 22.4% were households with a male householder and no spouse or partner present, and 18.4% were households with a female householder and no spouse or partner present. About 26.5% of all households were made up of individuals and 8.2% had someone living alone who was 65 years of age or older.

There were 57 housing units, of which 14.0% were vacant. The homeowner vacancy rate was 2.6% and the rental vacancy rate was 0.0%.

Racial composition as of the 2020 census
Race	Number	Percent
White	106	85.5%
Black or African American	0	0.0%
American Indian and Alaska Native	4	3.2%
Asian	0	0.0%
Native Hawaiian and Other Pacific Islander	0	0.0%
Some other race	4	3.2%
Two or more races	10	8.1%
Hispanic or Latino (of any race)	9	7.3%

=== 2000 census ===
As of the census of 2000, there were 156 people, 60 households, and 48 families residing in the town. The population density was 567.9 inhabitants per square mile (219.3/km^{2}). There were 71 housing units at an average density of 258.5 per square mile (99.8/km^{2}). The racial makeup of the town was 98.7% White, 0.6% African American, and 1.3% from two or more races.

Of the 60 households noted, 40.0% had children under the age of 18 living with them, 73.3% were married couples living together, 5.0% had a female householder with no husband present, and 20.0% were non-families. 20.0% of all households were made up of individuals, and 16.7% had someone living alone who was 65 years of age or older. The average household size was 2.60 and the average family size was 2.96.

In the town, the population was spread out, with 25.6% under the age of 18, 7.1% from 18 to 24, 25.0% from 25 to 44, 25.0% from 45 to 64, and 17.3% who were 65 years of age or older. The median age was 41.3 years. For every 100 females, there were 90.2 males. For every 100 females age 18 and over, there were 100.0 males.

The median income for a household in the town was $34,375, and the median income for a family was $34,844. Males had a median income of $28,125 versus $17,500 for females. The per capita income for the town was $17,234. None of the families and 1.2% of the population were living below the poverty line.
