= Aline-Cleo Independent School District =

School district in Oklahoma

Location
- Aline, Oklahoma United States

District information
- Type: Public

The Aline-Cleo Independent School District is a school district based in Aline, Oklahoma United States. It contains a combined elementary/middle school and a high school.

== See also ==
- List of school districts in Oklahoma
