= Oklahoma State Highway 14 =

State highway in Oklahoma, United States

State Highway 14
- SH-14 highlighted in red

Route information
- Maintained by ODOT
- Length: 27.85 mi (44.82 km)
- Existed: August 24, 1924–present

Major junctions
- South end: US 281 / SH-45 in Waynoka
- North end: US 64 / US 281 in Alva (concurrent with both routes)

Location
- Country: United States
- State: Oklahoma

Highway system
- Oklahoma State Highway System; Interstate; US; State; Turnpikes
| ← SH-11 | → SH-15 |

State Highway 14, abbreviated as SH-14, is a highway maintained by the U.S. state of Oklahoma. It is 27.85 miles (44.82 km) long, with its entire route falling in Woods County in the northwestern part of the state. It does not have any lettered spur routes.

SH-14 was part of Oklahoma's original highway system, as designated on August 24, 1924, and ran from Frederick in southwestern Oklahoma to the Kansas state line. In the late 1930s, however, new U.S. routes were introduced to Oklahoma; U.S. Highway 281 (US-281) and US-183 overtook most of SH-14's route, reducing it to its present-day extent.

== Route description ==
SH-14 begins at U.S. Highway 281 and SH-45 in Waynoka. From this point, the highway heads west for a few blocks on the north edge of Waynoka. It then turns north and, after curving slightly to the east, follows a due north course to US-64 east of Cora.

Signage present along the road indicates that SH-14 ends at US-64. However, both the Oklahoma state highway map and ODOT's internal control section maps show SH-14 turning east at this intersection. SH-14 then overlaps US-64, unsigned, into Alva, the county seat. The route continues through Alva, where US-64 and unsigned SH-14 overlap US-281. On the east side of the town, US-281 splits off to the north; this intersection is the end of SH-14.

== History ==
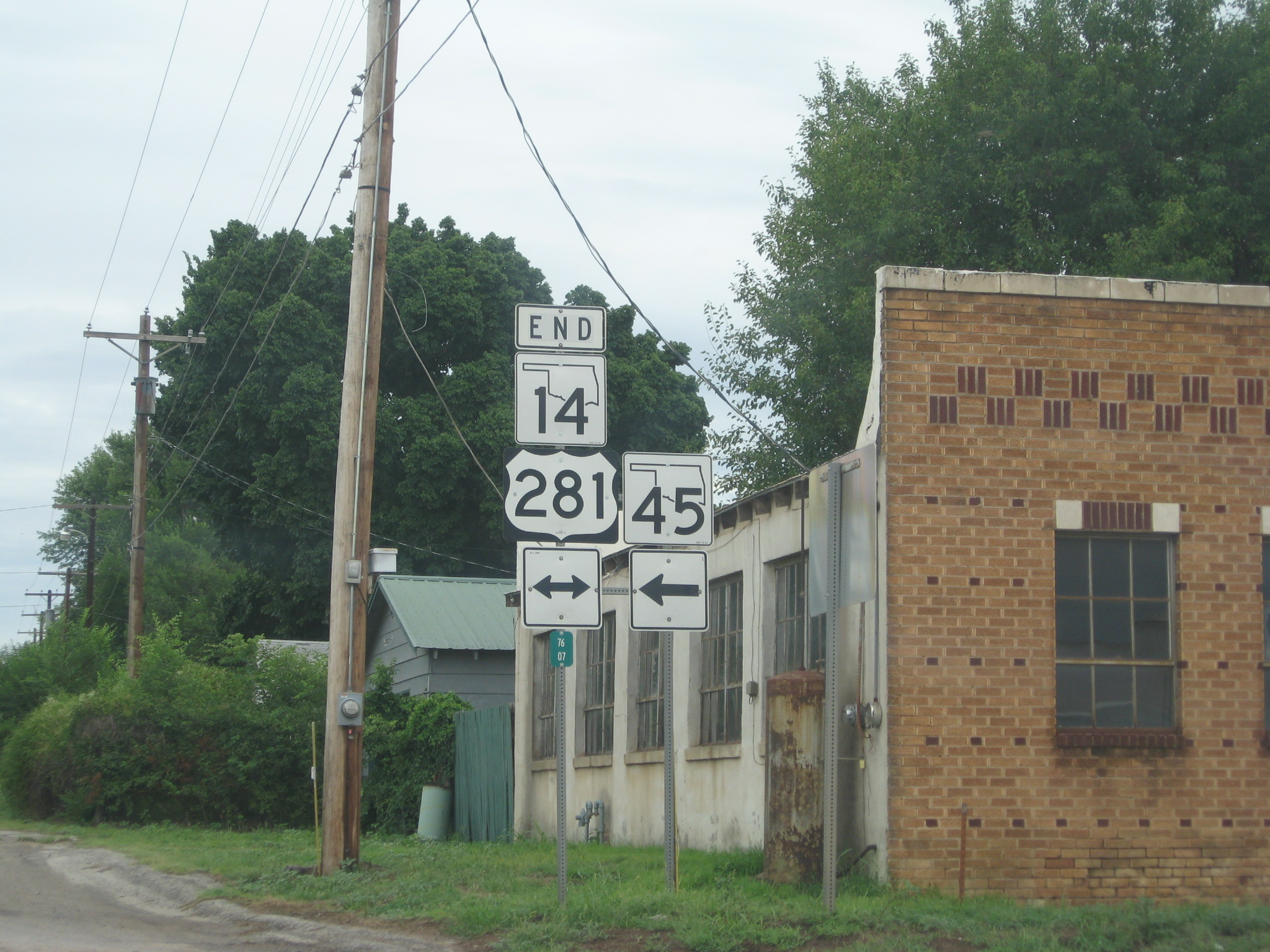
SH-14's southern terminus in Waynoka was established in 1941.

State Highway 14 has its roots in the original 1924 state highway system. SH-14, as designated on August 24, 1924, was nearly a border-to-border route. It began at SH-5 east of Frederick and proceeded north to Manitou. It then intersected SH-7 in Snyder and ran through Mountain Park shortly thereafter. The route then zig-zagged to the northwest towards Roosevelt. It then ran due north to the Hobart area, beginning a concurrency with SH-9 east of that town. After SH-9 split off to the east, SH-14 entered Washita County, where it intersected no other highways, but ran through the towns of Rocky, Cordell (the county seat), and Bessie. Just after crossing into Custer County, the highway had a concurrency with SH-3; the two routes split up in Clinton. SH-14 continued on a due north course through Arapaho, Putnam, and Taloga. In Seiling, SH-14 turned west, overlapping SH-13 through Cestos to a point just east of Vici, where SH-14 split away from SH-13. SH-14 then passed through Sharon en route to Woodward. It concurred with SH-15 to Tangier, then split off to the north to run through Fort Supply before ending at SH-11 east of Buffalo.

Unlike many of the other original highways, SH-14 was not immediately affected by the introduction of the United States Numbered Highways system in 1929. However, SH-14 underwent its first alteration in 1929, when it was extended south through Frederick and Davidson to the Texas state line.

By the end of 1931, State Highway 14 had been realigned north of Seiling. From Seiling, the road continued north (rather than concurring with what was by then US-60 towards Vici) to Chester and Waynoka. From Waynoka, the route continued north along present-day U.S. 281 through Alva to the state line south of Hardtner, Kansas. (The old road north of Vici became part of SH-34.)

New U.S. routes were added to Oklahoma's highway system in 1938. Among these were US-281, formerly a split route with one section in Kansas and one in Texas, which was connected in 1938 via Oklahoma; also added in 1938 was a southern extension of US-183. These two routes were overlaid onto SH-14, with US-183 entering the state from the south near Davidson and following the SH-14 route to Seiling, and US-281 taking the remainder of the route.

SH-14 was rerouted to follow an independent routing northward from Waynoka (the present day routing) in 1940, and the section of the highway connecting Alva to the Kansas line was dropped (making this road solely US-281). The rest of the highway, still concurrent with US-183 and US-281, was decommissioned the following year, leaving SH-14 at its present-day termini. No changes have been made to SH-14 since.

== Junction list ==
The entire route is in Woods County.

| Location | mi | km | Destinations | Notes |
|---|---|---|---|---|
| Waynoka | 0.00 | 0.00 | US 281 / SH-45 east | Southern terminus; western terminus of SH-45 |
| | 14.87 | 23.93 | US 64 | Northern terminus as signed; Western end of US-64 concurrency as recorded by ODOT |
| Alva | 26.9 | 43.3 | US 281 | Western end of US-281 concurrency |
| Alva | 27.85 | 44.82 | US 64 / US 281 | Northern terminus as recorded by ODOT; US-64 and US-281 split at this intersection; eastern end of US-64/281 concurrency |
1.000 mi = 1.609 km; 1.000 km = 0.621 mi: Concurrency terminus
