= Driftwood, Oklahoma =

Unincorporated community in Oklahoma, US

- Unincorporated community
- Location within the state of Oklahoma Driftwood, Oklahoma (the United States)
- Coordinates: 36°52′45″N 98°21′34″W
- Country: United States
- State: Oklahoma
- County: Alfalfa
- Incorporated: 1898

Government
  - Type: unincorporated (part of Stella township)
- Elevation: 1,191 ft (363 m)

Population (1990)
  - Total: 27 (most recent available)
- Time zone: UTC-6 (Central (CST))
  - Summer (DST): UTC-5 (CDT)
- ZIP codes: 73728
- Area code: 580
- GNIS feature ID: 1092189

Driftwood is a small unincorporated community in northern Alfalfa County, Oklahoma, United States. A formerly prosperous small rural community, at one time it had two churches, a grocery store, barber shop, gas station with repair shop, grain elevator, two-story school, a telephone office, bank, and post office. Currently, it is made up of less than a dozen residences - along with a church and cemetery - grouped along both sides of Oklahoma State Highway 8/State Highway 58.

== History ==
Prior to statehood in 1907, all the lands of what was to one day become Alfalfa County were part of the Cherokee Outlet under the control of the Cherokee Nation. A prominent rancher, Major Andrew Drumm, leased grazing lands from the Cherokee in the 1870s and 1880s at a location between the Salt Fork and Medicine, or Medicine Lodge rivers, from which he operated his 150,000 acres (61,000 ha) U Ranch. Starting in 1874, the U Ranch headquarters was located a few miles north of present-day Cherokee, just southeast of Driftwood.

The town of Driftwood was officially incorporated in 1898. (However, a footnote to the 1930 U.S. Census states that the town was "incorporated from part of Driftwood township in 1924.") The name "Driftwood" was taken from nearby Driftwood Creek, which empties into the Medicine Lodge River. Driftwood's post office was established May 12, 1894. From 1902 to 1906, this post office also served nearby Burlington (then known as Drumm).

In 1901, a stage line was established connecting nearby Kiowa, Kansas with Alfalfa county towns, including Burlington, Driftwood, Cherokee, Yewed, and Augusta. The county's first railroad, the Choctaw Northern Railroad (later owned by the Chicago, Rock Island, and Pacific) connected Driftwood to the other Alfalfa county towns of Aline, Augusta, Lambert, Ingersoll, Amorita, and on into Kansas.

The little town's population would peak in 1930 with 71 inhabitants.

The railroad line through Driftwood and its neighboring towns was abandoned in 1936. The town's post office was closed on October 31, 1959. Its population was listed as 32 in 1963. In the 1960s, the local schools from the towns of Driftwood, Byron, Amorita, and Burlington were all consolidated into the Burlington School District located in nearby Burlington. After the abandoning of its only rail line, the declining population had made it increasingly difficult to sustain educational and city services so that by 1980, Driftwood was no longer incorporated. By the 1990 census, its population had dwindled to just 27 persons.

== Geography ==
Driftwood is located in north-central Alfalfa County straddling Oklahoma State Highway 8/State Highway 58, 8 miles (13 km) south of the Kansas-Oklahoma line. It is 8 miles (13 km) straight north of Cherokee on combined State Highways 8 and 58 and lies roughly 1 mile (1.6 km) to the west of the course of the Medicine Lodge River.

The U.S. Geological Survey cites Driftwood's latitude as 36°52′45″N (36.8791951) and its longitude as 98°21′34″W (-98.3595173) with an elevation of 1191 feet.

== Notable people ==
R. Orin Cornett (1913 – 2002) was born in Driftwood on November 14, 1913. Cornett earned his doctorate of physics and applied mathematics from the University of Texas in 1940 and taught physics, mathematics, and electronics at Oklahoma Baptist, Penn State, and Harvard universities. He was the inventor of the system of communication for the deaf known as Cued Speech. He also served in education administration as a vice president at Oklahoma Baptist University and in various positions including the Vice President of Long Range Planning for Gallaudet University.

== See also ==
- Andrew Drumm Institute
