= Lookout, Oklahoma =

- Unincorporated community
- Location within the state of Oklahoma Lookout, Oklahoma (the United States)
- Coordinates: 36°56′13″N 99°16′36″W
- Country: United States
- State: Oklahoma
- County: Woods
- Time zone: UTC-6 (Central (CST))
  - Summer (DST): UTC-5 (CDT)

Lookout is an unincorporated community located in Woods County, Oklahoma, United States.

== History ==
The Lookout post office was opened October 16, 1901. The 1905 Oklahoma Territorial Census gives the population of Lookout as 10.

The community is spread out and sparsely populated. The church, cemetery, and community hall are no closer than a mile from one another.

Lookout was named for the commanding view across the Cimarron Valley. In 1878 Dull Knife's Cheyenne's caught and killed two cowboys near here (see Dull Knife's Raid).
