= Oklahoma State Highway 8 =

Highway in Oklahoma

State Highway 8
- OK 8; mainline in red, spur routes in blue

Route information
- Maintained by ODOT
- Length: 179.1 mi (288.2 km)
- Existed: August 24, 1924–present

Major junctions
- South end: US 277 / SH-19 in Cyril
- US 62 / SH-9 in Anadarko; US 281 from Anadarko to Watonga; I-40 near Hinton; US 270 from Geary to Watonga; US 60 from Fairview to Cleo Springs; US 412 in Cleo Springs; US 64 in Cherokee
- North end: K-8 at the Kansas state line in Kiowa, KS

Location
- Country: United States
- State: Oklahoma

Highway system
- Oklahoma State Highway System; Interstate; US; State; Turnpikes
← SH-7	→ SH-9

State Highway 8, also abbreviated as SH-8 or OK-8, is a highway maintained by the U.S. state of Oklahoma. Because it runs mainly north–south, it has an even number (which is normal for Oklahoma state highways, but opposite from national highways). Highway 8 runs from U.S. Highway 277 in Cyril, Oklahoma to the state line south of Kiowa, Kansas, for a total length of 179.1 miles (288.2 km) The highway has two lettered spur routes.

Highway 8 dates from the creation of the state highway system in 1924. Initially a border-to-border route, it was shortened to its current extent due to encroaching U.S. highways. SH-8 has followed its current route since 1966.

== Route description ==
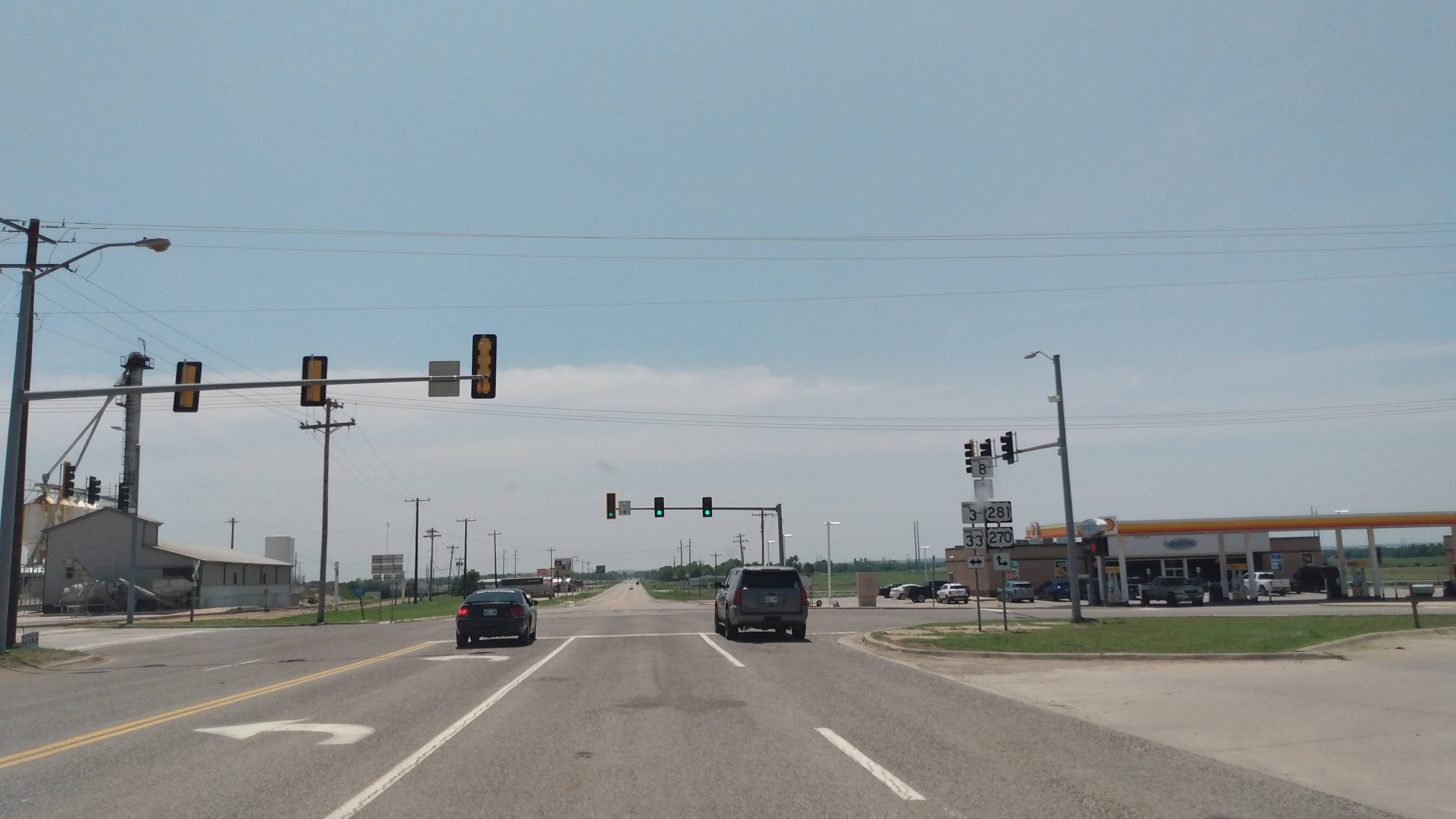
The SH-8, SH-33, SH-3, US-270, and US-281 intersection in Watonga, Oklahoma, in 2023

The highway begins in Cyril, at US-277 (which at the time is concurrent with State Highway 19), and immediately heads northward. Fourteen miles (23 km) later, the highway passes through Anadarko, sharing a brief overlap with US-62/SH-9. It also becomes concurrent with US-281 here, which it remains with after passing through Anadarko.

US-281 and SH-8 continue northward to meet SH-152, which they overlap for five miles (8.0 km). SH-152 splits off to the west at Binger, and US-281/SH-8 go northward through Lookeba to meet SH-37 at its western terminus in Hinton. Four miles (6.4 km) to the north, the two highways have an interchange with Interstate 40 at its milemarker 101. After this, US-281/SH-8 cross the Canadian River and begin a concurrency with U.S. Highway 270 in Geary. SH-8 splits off by itself after passing through Watonga, sixteen miles (26 km) to the north.

North of Watonga, SH-8 generally runs parallel to SH-51A and, after intersecting SH-51 in Okeene, it runs parallel to SH-58. Eleven miles (18 km) north of Okeene, SH-58 and SH-8 switch places through a 9-mile (14 km) overlap, with SH-8 ending up running to the west through Fairview and SH-58 running to the east to Ringwood.

After swapping places with SH-58, Highway 8 continues north, overlapping US-60 for nine miles (14 km), spending the last three miles (4.8 km) also signed concurrently with US-412. Eleven miles (18 km) north of this, SH-8 has a three-mile (4.8 km) concurrency with SH-45 southeast of Carmen. Through Cherokee, the Alfalfa County seat, it overlaps U.S. Highway 64 and SH-58. After US-64 splits off to the west, SH-11 joins the concurrency.

After six miles (9.7 km), SH-58 splits off to the northeast. SH-11 and SH-8 remain overlapped for seven more miles (11.3 km) before splitting off to the north. SH-8 ends seven miles (11 km) to the north of this at the Kansas state line. After crossing the state line, it becomes K-8, which soon ends at K-2 in Kiowa, Kansas.

== History ==
SH-8 was one of the original thirty-one state highways created on 1924-08-24. When it was created, it was a border-to-border highway, stretching from Texas to Kansas. It began at the Red River near Burkburnett, Texas. It then passed through Randlett and had a short concurrency with SH-5 west of Walters. The highway then ran through Lawton—concurring with the original SH-29—en route to Anadarko via Apache. In Anadarko, SH-8 linked up with the present highway. The remainder of the route was mostly the same as it is today.

In November 1926, AASHTO officially approved the United States Numbered Highways system. The Oklahoma Transportation Commission applied the national highways to Oklahoma's state highway system on 1926-11-26. Three U.S. highways were assigned to portions of what was then SH-8: U.S. Highway 64 was added to a segment of highway south of Cherokee, U.S. Highway 66 was added between Bridgeport and Geary, and U.S. Highway 70 was added from the Texas state line to Randlett. US-66 and 64 merely ran concurrently with SH-8. However, US-70 completely replaced the state highway, which was truncated so that its southern terminus was at US-70 in Randlett.

By 1936, several U.S. highways had been added to the system that took over parts of State Highway 8's route. US-62, added in 1930, took over the Lawton–Anadarko portion of the road. US-277 took over much of the remaining route between Randlett and Lawton. In addition, a US-70N had been created that overlaid US-277 between Randlett and the split with SH-5 west of Walters. These changes to the U.S. route system precipitated the truncation of SH-8 in 1936. On 1936-03-13, the section of the route between Anadarko and the state line was dropped. However, a new road between Anadarko and Cyril had been built; this became part of SH-8 and set the highway's southern terminus at its present location.

By the end of 1937, however, the highway's southern terminus had changed once again. On 1937-10-19, SH-8 had been truncated to Anadarko. However, on 1938-10-18, the route was extended back to the former southern terminus at Randlett; this change did not appear on the state map until the April 1941 edition. On 1941-04-14, the route was realigned to run through Cyril once again.

On 1955-09-12, SH-8 underwent a small realignment. Previously, the highway went due north from Carmen, then turned due east, running through Lambert before connecting to US-64 south of Cherokee. As a result of the 1955 realignment, SH-8 cut northeast to connect to US-64 directly, bypassing Lambert.

All of SH-8 between Randlett and Cyril was once again dropped on 1966-05-09, restoring the route to its current southern terminus at US-277/SH-19 in Cyril. No major changes to the highway have occurred since 1966.

== Spurs ==
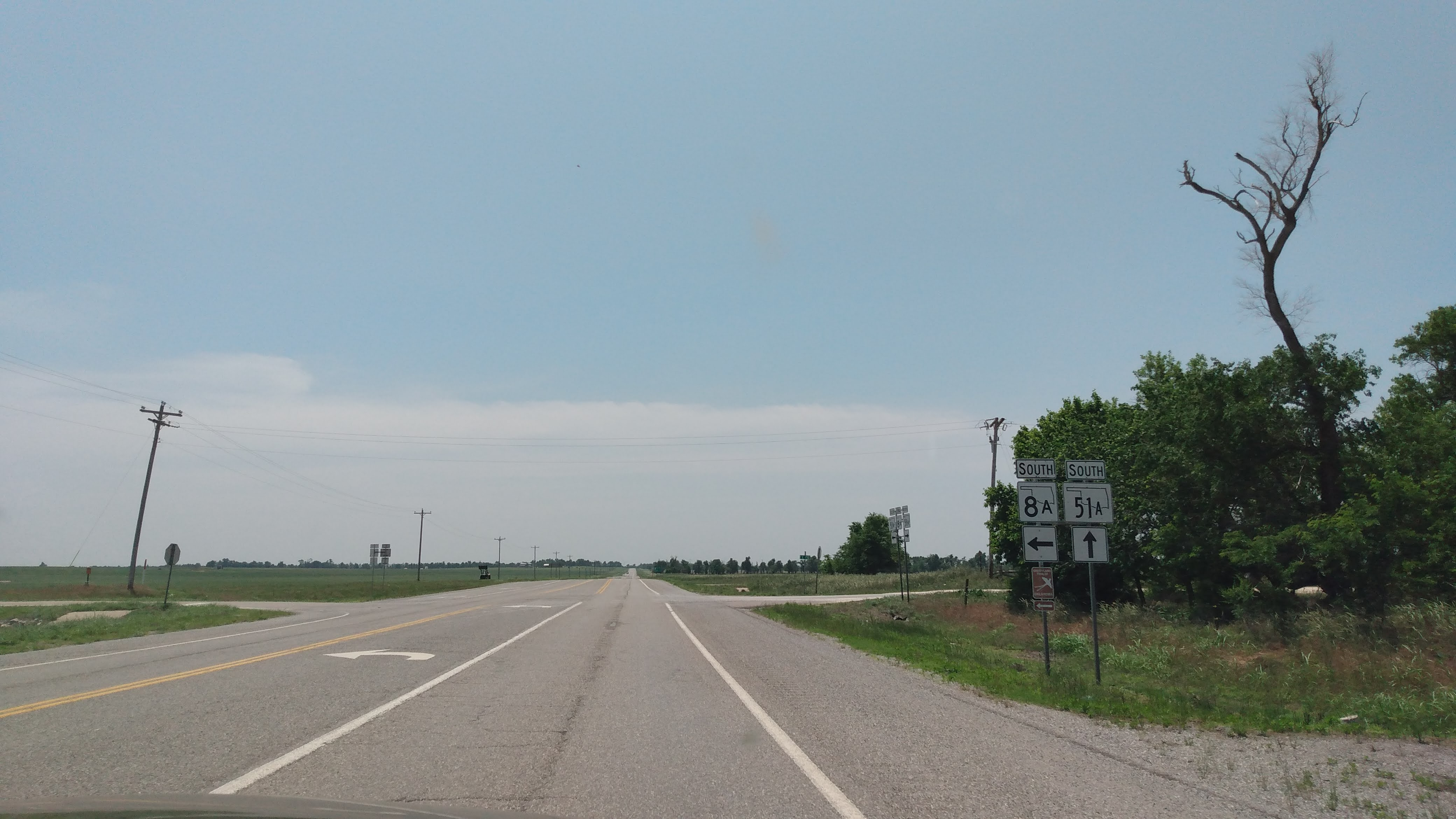
The SH-51A and SH-8A intersection north of Watonga in Blaine County, Oklahoma

- SH-8A runs from SH-8 to SH-51A, north of Watonga. Along the way, it provides access to Roman Nose State Park.
- A former SH-8A connected the highway to the town of Geronimo. When SH-8 was truncated to Cyril in 1966, it became SH-281A.
- SH-8B is a spur route from SH-8 to Aline.

== Junction list ==
County	Location	mi	km	Destinations	Notes
Caddo	Cyril	0.0	0.0	US 277 / SH-19	Southern terminus
Caddo	Anadarko	13.1	21.1	US 62 / SH-9	Eastern end of US-62/SH-9 concurrency
Caddo	Anadarko	13.7	22.0	US 62 / US 281 / SH-9	Western end of US-62/SH-9 concurrency, southern end of US-281 concurrency
Caddo		29.3	47.2	SH-152	Eastern end of SH-152 concurrency
Caddo	Binger	33.9	54.6	SH-152	Western end of SH-152 concurrency
Caddo	Hinton	46.1	74.2	SH-37	Western terminus of SH-37
Caddo		50.2	80.8	I-40	Diamond interchange; exit 101
Canadian		55.1	88.7	US-281 Spur	Northern terminus of US-281 Spur
Blaine	Geary	59.2	95.3	US 270	Southern end of US-270 concurrency
Blaine	Watonga	76.1	122.5	US 270 / US 281 / SH-3 / SH-33	Northern end of US-270/US-281 concurrency
Blaine		79.8	128.4	SH-51A	Southern terminus of SH-51A
Blaine		80.3	129.2	SH-8A	Southern terminus of SH-8A
Blaine	Okeene	99.4	160.0	SH-51	
Major		110.4	177.7	SH-58	Eastern end of SH-58 concurrency
Major	Fairview	119.4	192.2	US 60 / SH-58	Western end of SH-58 concurrency, southern end of US-60 concurrency
Major	Orienta	125.4	201.8	US 412	Western end of US-412 concurrency
Major	Cleo Springs	119.4	192.2	US 60 / US 412	Northern end of US-60 concurrency, eastern end of US-412 concurrency
Alfalfa		136.7	220.0	SH-8B	Eastern terminus of SH-8B
Alfalfa		138.7	223.2	SH-45	Southern end of SH-45 concurrency
Alfalfa		141.7	228.0	SH-45	Northern end of SH-45 concurrency
Alfalfa		149.0	239.8	US 64 / SH-58	Southern end of US-64/SH-58 concurrency
Alfalfa		158.2	254.6	US 64 / SH-11	Northern end of US-64 concurrency, southern end of SH-11 concurrency
Alfalfa	Driftwood	165.2	265.9	SH-58	Northern end of SH-58 concurrency
Alfalfa		172.2	277.1	SH-11	Northern end of SH-11 concurrency
Oklahoma–Kansas state line		179.1	288.2	K-8 continues north into Kansas	
1.000 mi = 1.609 km; 1.000 km = 0.621 mi: Concurrency terminus

== See also ==
- List of state highways in Oklahoma
