= Aline, Oklahoma =

Town in Oklahoma, US

- Town
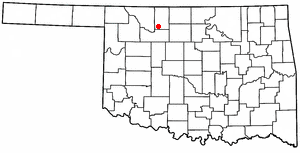
- Location of Aline, Oklahoma
- Coordinates: 36°30′35″N 98°26′55″W
- Country: United States
- State: Oklahoma
- County: Alfalfa

Area
  - Total: 0.27 sq mi (0.69 km^{2})
  - Land: 0.27 sq mi (0.69 km^{2})
  - Water: 0 sq mi (0.00 km^{2})
- Elevation: 1,289 ft (393 m)

Population (2020)
  - Total: 168
  - Density: 635.0/sq mi (245.17/km^{2})
- Time zone: UTC-6 (Central (CST))
  - Summer (DST): UTC-5 (CDT)
- ZIP code: 73716
- Area code: 580
- FIPS code: 40-01350
- GNIS feature ID: 2412348

Aline is a town in Alfalfa County, Oklahoma, United States. The population was 168 at the time of the 2020 Census.

== History ==
The Choctaw Northern Railroad (later owned by the Chicago, Rock Island and Pacific) became the county's first railway in 1901, connecting Aline to the other Alfalfa county towns of Augusta, Ingersoll, Lambert, Driftwood, Amorita, and on into Kansas.

== Geography ==
According to the United States Census Bureau, the town has a total area of 0.263 square miles (0.68 km^{2}), all land.

Aline is connected to the state highway system via State Highway 8B. The town lies at the western terminus of the highway.

== Demographics ==
Historical population
| Census | Pop. | Note | %± |
|---|---|---|---|
| 1910 | 303 | | — |
| 1920 | 358 | | 18.2% |
| 1930 | 429 | | 19.8% |
| 1940 | 405 | | −5.6% |
| 1950 | 385 | | −4.9% |
| 1960 | 314 | | −18.4% |
| 1970 | 260 | | −17.2% |
| 1980 | 313 | | 20.4% |
| 1990 | 295 | | −5.8% |
| 2000 | 214 | | −27.5% |
| 2010 | 207 | | −3.3% |
| 2020 | 168 | | −18.8% |
U.S. Decennial Census

=== 2020 census ===
As of the 2020 census, Aline had a population of 168. The median age was 41.3 years. 20.2% of residents were under the age of 18 and 19.6% of residents were 65 years of age or older. For every 100 females there were 102.4 males, and for every 100 females age 18 and over there were 106.2 males age 18 and over.

0.0% of residents lived in urban areas, while 100.0% lived in rural areas.

There were 79 households in Aline, of which 26.6% had children under the age of 18 living in them. Of all households, 44.3% were married-couple households, 24.1% were households with a male householder and no spouse or partner present, and 25.3% were households with a female householder and no spouse or partner present. About 41.8% of all households were made up of individuals and 17.8% had someone living alone who was 65 years of age or older.

There were 102 housing units, of which 22.5% were vacant. The homeowner vacancy rate was 4.5% and the rental vacancy rate was 0.0%.

Racial composition as of the 2020 census
| Race | Number | Percent |
|---|---|---|
| White | 157 | 93.5% |
| Black or African American | 0 | 0.0% |
| American Indian and Alaska Native | 2 | 1.2% |
| Asian | 0 | 0.0% |
| Native Hawaiian and Other Pacific Islander | 0 | 0.0% |
| Some other race | 1 | 0.6% |
| Two or more races | 8 | 4.8% |
| Hispanic or Latino (of any race) | 4 | 2.4% |

=== 2010 census ===
As of the census of 2010, there were 207 people living in the town. The population density was 813.3 inhabitants per square mile (314.0/km^{2}). There were 123 housing units at an average density of 480 per square mile (190/km^{2}). The racial makeup of the town was 95.79% White, 0.93% Native American, 0.47% from other races, and 2.80% from two or more races. Hispanic or Latino of any race were 1.40% of the population.

There were 101 households, out of which 18.8% had children under the age of 18 living with them, 53.5% were married couples living together, 6.9% had a female householder with no husband present, and 36.6% were non-families. 35.6% of all households were made up of individuals, and 22.8% had someone living alone who was 65 years of age or older. The average household size was 2.12 and the average family size was 2.69.

In the town, the population was spread out, with 18.2% under the age of 18, 11.2% from 18 to 24, 21.5% from 25 to 44, 26.2% from 45 to 64, and 22.9% who were 65 years of age or older. The median age was 45 years. For every 100 females, there were 103.8 males. For every 100 females age 18 and over, there were 101.1 males.

The median income for a household in the town was $25,556, and the median income for a family was $28,333. Males had a median income of $26,500 versus $17,083 for females. The per capita income for the town was $12,710. About 22.4% of families and 24.1% of the population were below the poverty line, including 21.1% of those under the age of eighteen and 33.3% of those sixty five or over.

== Attractions ==
- Aline is home to the Sod House Museum The museum encloses an original sod house, the only one still standing in Oklahoma that was built by a homesteader.

== Education ==
Aline is serviced by the Aline-Cleo Independent School District.

== Notable people ==
- Harold G. Kiner (April 14, 1924 – October 2, 1944), United States Army Medal of Honor winner; born here
