= Byron, Oklahoma =

Town in Oklahoma, US

- Town
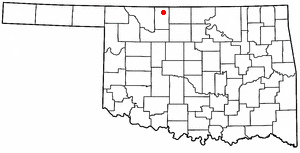
- Location of Byron, Oklahoma
- Coordinates: 36°54′05″N 98°17′40″W
- Country: United States
- State: Oklahoma
- County: Alfalfa

Area
  - Total: 0.25 sq mi (0.65 km^{2})
  - Land: 0.25 sq mi (0.65 km^{2})
  - Water: 0 sq mi (0.00 km^{2})
- Elevation: 1,194 ft (364 m)

Population (2020)
  - Total: 37
  - Density: 146.8/sq mi (56.69/km^{2})
- Time zone: UTC-6 (Central (CST))
  - Summer (DST): UTC-5 (CDT)
- ZIP code: 73722
- Area code: 580
- FIPS code: 40-10650
- GNIS feature ID: 2413145

Byron is a town in Alfalfa County, Oklahoma, United States. As of the 2020 census, Byron had a population of 37.

== History ==
Byron was named by Postmaster V. C. Spurrier, who received a postal designation on April 27, 1898, for a town to be named Byron - after his relative, Byron Spurrier, who owned a store there. Originally located in Woods County, Byron became part of the newly organized Alfalfa County in 1907, at the time of statehood.

While the town was listed in an 1898 state gazetteer, its lack of railroad access caused the new settlement to develop slowly at first. However, in April 1901, W. C. Edwards purchased land for a new townsite about a mile south and one-half mile east of the original settlement and within the course of a month the existing business buildings were moved from the old to the new town site and a new bank, meat market, and lumberyard had been opened. In April 1902, the Woods County commission incorporated the town of Byron. In anticipation of the arrival of the Kansas City, Mexico and Orient Railway line that ran south from Kansas through the county, a grain elevator was constructed in October. Upon completion of the line to Byron on October 21 of that year, "the town celebrated with a huge bonfire, and the railroad laborers were treated to lemonade, cigars, and locally grown apples."

After the arrival of the railroad, Byron flourished economically. The town's population reached it peak of 286 by 1909. Notable businesses included the Byron State Bank, two newspapers - the Byron Republican and the Byron Promoter - and both a Christian and a Methodist church. It also sported two hardware stores, three general stores, a blacksmith, and a flour mill.

Area farms produced both wheat and alfalfa and the town became an important market and shipping point for grain and livestock. In 1929, one of the state's four warm-water fish hatcheries was established to produce sport fish for state lakes and farm ponds, which remains to this day. However, Byron began a slow economic decline as falling agricultural prices and the Great Depression both took their toll. By 1930, the census counted only 197 residents.

An interesting political development briefly brought Byron into the news, when in 1935 five women unseated five male incumbents on the town board. They proceeded to pay off the town's debt and began to produce income through the sale of electricity to its residents.

Nonetheless, in 1942, the railroad abandoned its line through town. Through the 1940s and 1950s, only a half-dozen businesses were still in operation. A declining rural population prompted the combining of Byron's school with those of nearby Driftwood. Then in the 1960s, Burlington, Amorita, Byron, and Driftwood schools consolidated into a single school located in Burlington. Its population continued to fall to 131 in 1950, 72 in 1970, and only 57 in 1990. Byron ended the twentieth century with a population of 45, and by 2010, the U.S. Census counted just 35 residents.

== Geography ==
Byron lies along State Highway 58.

The town has a total area of 0.24 square miles (0.62 km^{2}), all land, with a population density of 153 people per square mile.

== Demographics ==
Historical population
Census	Pop.	Note	%±
1910	286		—
1920	249		−12.9%
1930	197		−20.9%
1940	177		−10.2%
1950	131		−26.0%
1960	82		−37.4%
1970	72		−12.2%
1980	67		−6.9%
1990	57		−14.9%
2000	45		−21.1%
2010	35		−22.2%
2020	37		5.7%
U.S. Decennial Census

=== 2020 census ===
As of the 2020 census, Byron had a population of 37. The median age was 35.3 years. 35.1% of residents were under the age of 18 and 27.0% of residents were 65 years of age or older. For every 100 females there were 76.2 males, and for every 100 females age 18 and over there were 100.0 males age 18 and over.

0.0% of residents lived in urban areas, while 100.0% lived in rural areas.

There were 14 households in Byron, of which 42.9% had children under the age of 18 living in them. Of all households, 64.3% were married-couple households, 21.4% were households with a male householder and no spouse or partner present, and 14.3% were households with a female householder and no spouse or partner present. About 28.6% of all households were made up of individuals and 14.2% had someone living alone who was 65 years of age or older.

There were 14 housing units, of which 0.0% were vacant. The homeowner vacancy rate was 0.0% and the rental vacancy rate was 0.0%.

Racial composition as of the 2020 census
Race	Number	Percent
White	36	97.3%
Black or African American	0	0.0%
American Indian and Alaska Native	1	2.7%
Asian	0	0.0%
Native Hawaiian and Other Pacific Islander	0	0.0%
Some other race	0	0.0%
Two or more races	0	0.0%
Hispanic or Latino (of any race)	1	2.7%

=== 2000 census ===
As of the census of 2000, there were 45 people, 19 households, and 14 families residing in the town. The population density was 185.6 inhabitants per square mile (71.7/km^{2}). There were 26 housing units at an average density of 107.2 per square mile (41.4/km^{2}). The racial makeup of the town was 100.00% White.

There were 19 households, out of which 26.3% had children under the age of 18 living with them, 73.7% were married couples living together, and 26.3% were non-families. 26.3% of all households were made up of individuals, and 15.8% had someone living alone who was 65 years of age or older. The average household size was 2.37 and the average family size was 2.86.

In the town, the population was spread out, with 20.0% under the age of 18, 6.7% from 18 to 24, 26.7% from 25 to 44, 24.4% from 45 to 64, and 22.2% who were 65 years of age or older. The median age was 40 years. For every 100 females, there were 73.1 males. For every 100 females age 18 and over, there were 80.0 males.

The median income for a household in the town was $34,000, and the median income for a family was $33,500. Males had a median income of $19,375 versus $16,875 for females. The per capita income for the town was $44,525. There were 12.5% of families and 11.1% of the population living below the poverty line, including no one under the age of 18 and none of those over 64.
