= Ingersoll, Oklahoma =

Unincorporated community in Oklahoma, US

- Unincorporated community
- Location within the state of Oklahoma Ingersoll, Oklahoma (the United States)
- Coordinates: 36°47′47″N 98°23′41″W
- Country: United States
- State: Oklahoma
- County: Alfalfa
- Elevation: 1,204 ft (367 m)
- Time zone: UTC-6 (Central (CST))
  - Summer (DST): UTC-5 (CDT)

Ingersoll is a small unincorporated community in Alfalfa County, Oklahoma, United States.

== History ==
Ingersoll was named for Philadelphia railroad owner, Charles E. Ingersoll.

A post office was established September 13, 1901. The Choctaw Northern Railroad (later owned by the Chicago, Rock Island and Pacific) became the county's first railway in 1901, when it connected Ingersoll to the other Alfalfa county towns of Aline, Augusta, Lambert, Driftwood, Amorita, and then continuing on into Kansas.

After its bid to become the county seat failed, Ingersoll's prospects declined considerably. The railroad line was abandoned in 1936. Its post office was closed December 31, 1942.

Ingersoll formally disincorporated in December 1968.

The Ingersoll Tile Elevator (ca. 1920) was listed on the National Register of Historic Places in 1983.

== Geography ==
Ingersoll is located on U.S. Highway 64, 14 miles (23 km) east of Alva.

== See also ==
- National Register of Historic Places listings in Alfalfa County, Oklahoma
