= Woods County, Oklahoma =

County in Oklahoma, United States

- County
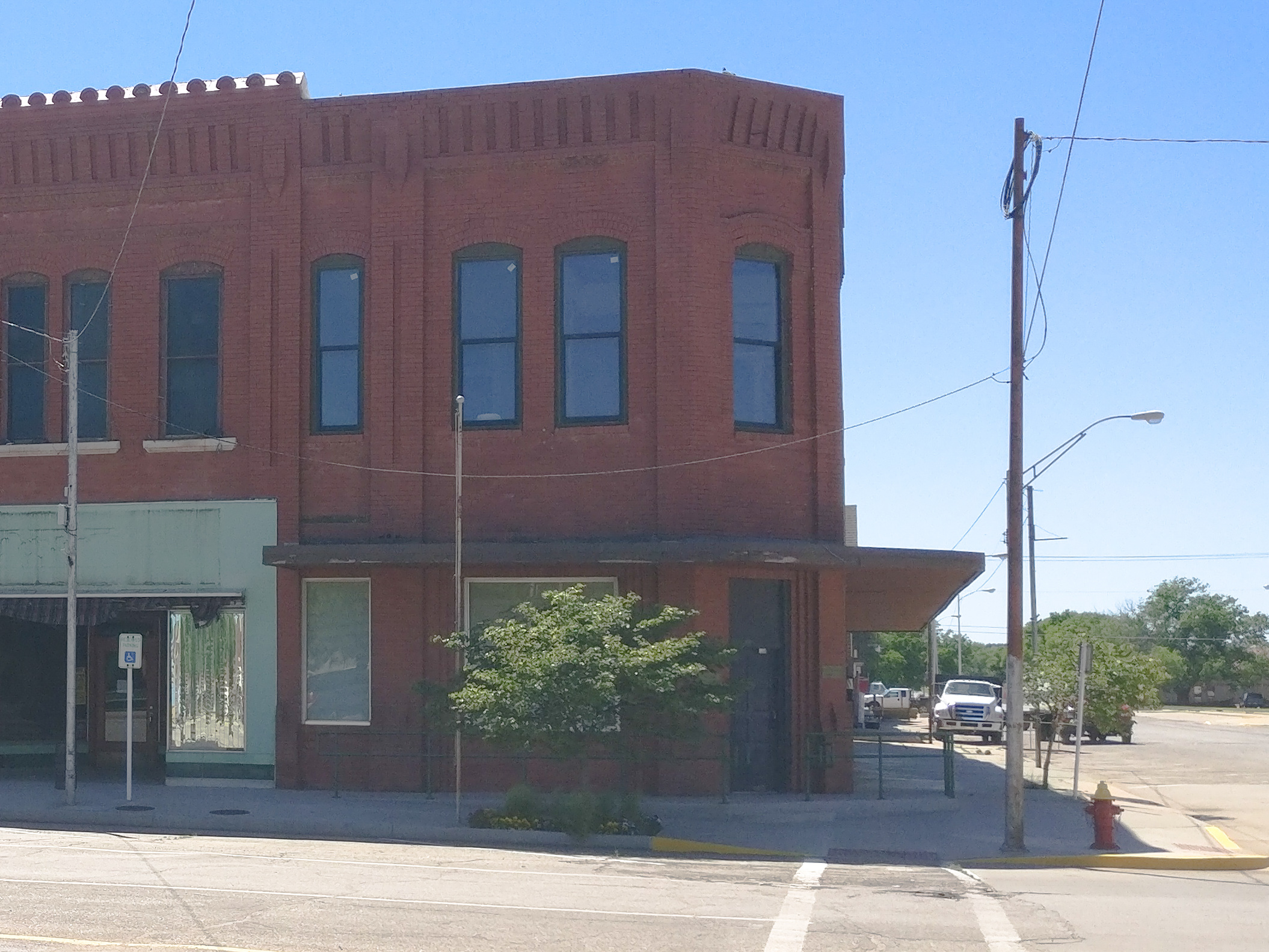
- Historic Central National Bank in Alva (2017)

- Location within the U.S. state of Oklahoma
- Coordinates: 36°46′N 98°52′W
- Country: United States
- State: Oklahoma
- Founded: 1893
- Named for: Samuel Newitt Wood
- Seat: Alva
- Largest city: Alva

Area
  - Total: 1,290 sq mi (3,300 km^{2})
  - Land: 1,286 sq mi (3,330 km^{2})
  - Water: 3.5 sq mi (9.1 km^{2}) 0.3%

Population (2020)
  - Total: 8,624
  - Estimate (2025): 8,443 ▼
  - Density: 6.706/sq mi (2.589/km^{2})
- Time zone: UTC−6 (Central)
  - Summer (DST): UTC−5 (CDT)
- Congressional district: 3rd

Woods County is a county located in the northwestern part of the U.S. state of Oklahoma. As of the 2020 census, the population was 8,624. Its county seat is Alva. The county is named after Samuel Newitt Wood, a renowned Kansas populist.

== History ==
The Burnham site in Woods County is a pre-Clovis site, that is, an archaeological site dating before 11,000 years ago. The region of Woods County, Oklahoma, was home to the Antelope Creek Phase of Southern Plains Villagers, a precontact culture of Native Americans, who are related to the Wichita and Affiliated Tribes.

An early European explorer of the area now contained within Woods County was George C. Sibley, who traveled through in 1811. He visited a salt formation near the present town of Freedom, Oklahoma, then followed the Mountain Fork of the Arkansas River southeastward to the Great Salt Plains. In 1843, Nathan Boone traveled along the Cimarron River.

The area was part of Cherokee Outlet, guaranteed to the Cherokee Nation under the Treaty of New Echota. It later became important for cattle ranching. The Dodge City and Red Fork Trail, a branch of the Chisholm Trail followed the north bank of the Cimarron River en route to Kansas. The U. S. Government acquired the Cherokee Outlet under Congressional Acts in 1889, 1891 and 1893, and divided the area into counties. One of these was designated M County, prior to opening the area for settlement. The Secretary of the Interior designated Alva as the county seat. M County was renamed Woods County by a ballot measure on November 6, 1894. The name was one of three put forth on the ballot, and was the Populists party's submission to honor Samuel Newitt Wood, a Kansas Populist. Despite the name being misspelled on the ballot, the election committee "decided to keep the s for euphony sake". Woods County became part of Oklahoma Territory.

The Constitutional Convention of 1906 created Major County and Alfalfa County from southern and eastern parts of Woods County and added a part of Woodward County to Woods County.

== Geography ==
According to the U.S. Census Bureau, the county has a total area of 1,290 square miles (3,300 km^{2}), of which 1,286 square miles (3,330 km^{2}) is land and 3.5 square miles (9.1 km^{2}) (0.3%) is water. It is located along the Kansas border.

=== Major highways ===
- U.S. Highway 64
- U.S. Highway 281
- State Highway 11
- State Highway 14
- State Highway 34
- State Highway 45
- State Highway 50

=== Adjacent counties ===
- Comanche County, Kansas (north)
- Barber County, Kansas (northeast)
- Alfalfa County (east)
- Major County (south)
- Woodward County (southwest)
- Harper County (west)

== Demographics ==
Historical population
Census	Pop.	Note	%±
1910	17,567		—
1920	15,939		−9.3%
1930	17,005		6.7%
1940	14,915		−12.3%
1950	14,526		−2.6%
1960	11,932		−17.9%
1970	11,920		−0.1%
1980	10,923		−8.4%
1990	9,103		−16.7%
2000	9,089		−0.2%
2010	8,878		−2.3%
2020	8,624		−2.9%
2025 (est.)	8,443	▼	−2.1%
U.S. Decennial Census; 1790-1960 1900-1990; 1990-2000 2010

=== 2020 census ===
As of the 2020 census, the county had a population of 8,624. Of the residents, 19.8% were under the age of 18 and 18.2% were 65 years of age or older; the median age was 35.1 years. For every 100 females there were 109.3 males, and for every 100 females age 18 and over there were 108.6 males.

The racial makeup of the county was 83.4% White, 2.7% Black or African American, 3.1% American Indian and Alaska Native, 0.9% Asian, 2.9% from some other race, and 7.0% from two or more races. Hispanic or Latino residents of any race comprised 7.1% of the population.

There were 3,346 households in the county, of which 28.6% had children under the age of 18 living with them and 25.3% had a female householder with no spouse or partner present. About 31.8% of all households were made up of individuals and 13.5% had someone living alone who was 65 years of age or older.

There were 4,456 housing units, of which 24.9% were vacant. Among occupied housing units, 66.5% were owner-occupied and 33.5% were renter-occupied. The homeowner vacancy rate was 5.1% and the rental vacancy rate was 22.3%.

=== 2010 census ===
As of the 2010 United States census, there were 8,878 people, 3,533 households, and 2,133 families residing in the county. The population density was 7 people per square mile (2.7 people/km^{2}). There were 4,478 housing units at an average density of 3.5 units per square mile (1.4/km^{2}). The racial makeup of the county was 88.4% white, 3.3% black or African American, 2.4% Native American, 0.9% Asian, less than 0.1% Pacific Islander, 2.3% from other races, and 2.7% from two or more races. 4.8% of the population were Hispanic or Latino of any race.

There were 3,533 households, out of which 23.2% had children under the age of 18 living with them, 47.9% were married couples living together, 7.6% had a female householder with no husband present, and 40.2% were non-families. 32.3% of households were made up of individuals, and 8.8% had someone living alone who was 65 years of age or older. 8.2% of the population was institutionalized The average household size was 2.23 and the average family size was 2.82.

In the county, the population was spread out, with 18.8% under the age of 18, 18.6% from 18 to 24, 22.3% from 25 to 44, 23.1% from 45 to 64, and 17.2% who were 65 years of age or older. The median age was 34.7 years. For every 100 females there were 114.8 males. For every 100 females age 18 and over, there were 109.9 males.

The median income for a household in the county was $47,255, and the median income for a family was $60,500. Males had a median income of $39,754 versus $23,897 for females. The per capita income for the county was $22,935. About 8% of families and 16% of the population were below the poverty line, including 10% of those age 65 or over.

== Politics ==
Voter Registration and Party Enrollment as of June 30, 2023
Party	Number of Voters	Percentage
Democratic	838	17.23%
Republican	3,404	69.97%
Others	623	12.81%
Total	4,865	100%

United States presidential election results for Woods County, Oklahoma
Year	Republican		Democratic		Third party(ies)	
Year	No.	%	No.	%	No.	%
1908	1,557	47.61%	1,420	43.43%	293	8.96%
1912	1,679	48.43%	1,247	35.97%	541	15.60%
1916	1,358	41.14%	1,417	42.93%	526	15.93%
1920	2,827	60.32%	1,530	32.64%	330	7.04%
1924	2,615	52.43%	1,533	30.73%	840	16.84%
1928	3,941	70.38%	1,550	27.68%	109	1.95%
1932	2,008	31.94%	4,279	68.06%	0	0.00%
1936	2,346	35.71%	4,179	63.62%	44	0.67%
1940	3,440	49.09%	3,506	50.04%	61	0.87%
1944	3,226	56.85%	2,426	42.75%	23	0.41%
1948	2,871	49.90%	2,882	50.10%	0	0.00%
1952	4,892	70.99%	1,999	29.01%	0	0.00%
1956	3,787	64.08%	2,123	35.92%	0	0.00%
1960	4,064	68.12%	1,902	31.88%	0	0.00%
1964	2,886	51.21%	2,750	48.79%	0	0.00%
1968	3,449	63.81%	1,439	26.62%	517	9.57%
1972	4,413	76.23%	1,234	21.32%	142	2.45%
1976	2,788	51.43%	2,530	46.67%	103	1.90%
1980	3,592	68.97%	1,364	26.19%	252	4.84%
1984	3,741	74.55%	1,231	24.53%	46	0.92%
1988	2,835	60.95%	1,735	37.30%	81	1.74%
1992	2,225	46.58%	1,361	28.49%	1,191	24.93%
1996	2,151	52.44%	1,431	34.89%	520	12.68%
2000	2,774	68.56%	1,235	30.52%	37	0.91%
2004	3,166	77.26%	932	22.74%	0	0.00%
2008	3,043	77.71%	873	22.29%	0	0.00%
2012	2,727	80.25%	671	19.75%	0	0.00%
2016	2,947	80.34%	522	14.23%	199	5.43%
2020	2,993	81.38%	591	16.07%	94	2.56%
2024	2,955	81.23%	614	16.88%	69	1.90%

== Communities ==
=== Cities ===
- Alva (county seat)
- Freedom
- Waynoka

=== Towns ===
- Capron
- Dacoma

=== Census designated places ===
- Avard (former town)
- Hopeton

=== Unincorporated communities ===
- Lookout
- Winchester

=== Former communities ===
A 1911 map of Woods County shows a large number of settlements which either no longer exist or remain only as small populated places, including:

- Abbie
- Cora
- Coy
- Eagle
- Fairvalley
- Fanshaw
- Farry
- Faulkner
- Fritzlen
- Flagg
- Galena
- Gamet
- Heman
- Irene
- Kingman
- Saratoga
- Tegarden
- Whitehorse

== NRHP Sites ==
There are multiple NRHP sites in the county, mostly in Alva but with some in Waynoka.

== See also ==
- Little Sahara State Park
- National Register of Historic Places listings in Woods County, Oklahoma
