= List of United States tornadoes in April 2012 =

This is a list of all tornadoes that were confirmed by local offices of the National Weather Service in the United States in April 2012.

== United States yearly total ==
Confirmed tornadoes by Enhanced Fujita rating
EFU	EF0	EF1	EF2	EF3	EF4	EF5	Total
0	583	241	94	26	4	0	939

== April ==
Confirmed tornadoes by Enhanced Fujita rating
EFU	EF0	EF1	EF2	EF3	EF4	EF5	Total
0	132	53	13	7	1	0	205

=== April 2 event ===
List of reported tornadoes - Monday, April 2, 2012
EF#	Location	County	Coord.	Time (UTC)	Path length	Comments/Damage
Texas
EF1	NE of Kirbyville	Newton	30.69°N 93.82°W	1545	3 miles (4.8 km)	A house was destroyed when a tree fell on it.
Sources: SPC Storm Reports for 04/02/12, NWS Lake Charles, LA

=== April 3 event ===
List of confirmed tornadoes – Tuesday, April 3, 2012 (Note: All dates are based on the local time zone where the tornado touched down; however, all times are in Coordinated Universal Time for consistency.)
EF#	Location	County / Parish	State	Start Coord.	Time (UTC)	Path length	Max width	Summary
EF1	N of Cleburne	Johnson	TX	32.35°N 97.40°W	17:41–17:43	1.16 miles (1.87 km)	60 yd (55 m)	Three manufactured homes were damaged, one of which lost its roof and an exterior wall. A horse trailer was overturned, a barn sustained roof damage, and two riding lawnmowers sustained damage. Damages totaled $60,000.
EF2	Oak Leaf to Southern Dallas	Ellis, Dallas	TX	32.60°N 96.75°W	18:00–18:35	13.7 miles (22.0 km)	200 yd (180 m)	In Oak Leaf, minor tree and shingle damage occurred before the tornado struck Lancaster and the southern fringes of Dallas at high-end EF2 strength. Many homes in Lancaster sustained severe damage or were destroyed, some of which lost roofs and exterior walls. Vehicles were moved and damaged, trees were downed, an RV was destroyed, and fence boards were speared into homes. Three buildings were damaged at an apartment complex, one of which had its roof torn off. The Cedar Valley Christian Academy was also heavily damaged and lost an exterior wall. A news helicopter broadcast live video as the tornado struck a Schneider National terminal and lofted several semi-trailers high into the air. Over 50 semi-trailers were damaged or destroyed, one of which was thrown into a house. Sixty-four homes were destroyed, and 109 others were damaged. Ten people were injured, two seriously. Damage was $400 million.
EF0	ENE of Burleson	Johnson	TX	32.54°N 97.28°W	18:08–18:09	0.27 miles (430 m)	50 yd (46 m)	Brief touchdown over an open field caused no damage.
EF2	Kennedale to Arlington	Tarrant	TX	32.63°N 97.22°W	18:21–18:40	6.4 miles (10.3 km)	150 yd (140 m)	A damaging multiple-vortex tornado caused high-end EF2 damage in Kennedale and Arlington. Five manufactured homes were destroyed at the beginning of the path near the Texas Raceway. Several businesses in Kennedale sustained damage, including a storage facility and a warehouse building that had a large portion of its roof torn off and tossed onto a water tower. Many apartments and homes in this area were damaged, some severely. Crossing into Arlington, the tornado caused damage to numerous additional houses and apartment buildings. Loss of roofs and exterior walls occurred, and a few two story homes sustained total destruction of their top floors. A nursing home had a large portion of its roof torn off and sustained damage to exterior walls, and a church was also damaged. Many trees and power poles were snapped along the path. Eighteen homes were destroyed and 291 others were damaged. Eight injuries occurred, one of which was serious. Damage was $200 million.
EF0	Eastern Dallas	Dallas	TX	32.78°N 96.69°W	18:54–18:55	0.09 miles (0.14 km)	25 yd (23 m)	A brief tornado touched down near Skyline High School, damaging trees and the roof of one house.
EF0	Northern Grand Prairie	Tarrant	TX	32.77°N 97.06°W	18:58–19:00	0.47 miles (0.76 km)	60 yd (55 m)	This brief tornado touched down in the northern part of Grand Prairie, damaging the roofs of a few warehouse buildings and a strip mall. A few light poles and power poles were blown over as well.
EF0	Northwestern Irving	Dallas	TX	32.86°N 96.98°W	19:08–19:13	1.31 miles (2.11 km)	30 yd (27 m)	This tornado struck Townsell Elementary School, where HVAC units were torn off the roof and a gas line was ruptured. The roof of a Goodwill store was damaged, and a house sustained awning damage. Trees and fences were downed, power poles were bent over, and a road sign was blown over as well.
EF0	Coppell	Dallas	TX	32.95°N 96.99°W	19:23–19:28	2.02 miles (3.25 km)	75 yd (69 m)	This tornado damaged a gas station awning and the roofs of several homes along a narrow, intermittent path through Coppell.
EF0	S of Denton	Denton	TX	33.16°N 97.14°W	19:40–19:41	0.21 miles (0.34 km)	50 yd (46 m)	Brief tornado touched down in an open field, causing no damage.
EF0	W of Cumby	Hunt	TX	33.1215°N 95.8967°W	20:20–20:21	0.3 miles (0.48 km)	25 yd (23 m)	A brief tornado occurred over open country, causing no damage.
EF0	Mesquite	Dallas	TX	32.77°N 96.60°W	20:22–20:24	0.28 miles (0.45 km)	30 yd (27 m)	This brief tornado touched down near the Mesquite Rodeo Arena. Several trees and tree limbs were downed, and houses sustained minor roof damage. An automotive business collapse of a masonry exterior wall. Two people were injured.
EF0	SW of Sulphur Springs	Hopkins	TX	33.08°N 95.66°W	20:24–20:25	0.12 miles (0.19 km)	25 yd (23 m)	This tornado remained over open country, causing no damage.
EF3	Forney	Kaufman	TX	32.75°N 96.47°W	20:33–20:39	7.73 miles (12.44 km)	150 yd (140 m)	This intense EF3 tornado caused major damage in Forney. At its initial touchdown point in downtown Forney, numerous trees were snapped and uprooted, the roof of a fire station was damaged, an outbuilding was destroyed, while other buildings sustained roof and window damage. A dry cleaning business suffered significant damage to its roof and signs. Several industrial buildings also sustained minor damage. The most intense damage occurred in the Diamond Creek subdivision, where several homes were completely destroyed and others sustained major structural damage. A few of these homes were nearly leveled, with only small portions of interior walls left intact. Vehicles were tossed and damaged in the parking lot at Crosby Elementary School, one of which was lofted 300 yards into a field. The school building itself sustained mainly roof damage. Seven people were injured, and damages amounted to $100 million.
EF0	N of Sulphur Springs	Hopkins	TX	33.13°N 95.60°W	20:54–20:55	0.58 miles (0.93 km)	50 yd (46 m)	Trees, power poles, and power lines were downed.
EF3	SE of Royse City	Rockwall, Hunt	TX	32.91°N 96.33°W	20:56–21:04	3.34 miles (5.38 km)	400 yd (370 m)	A large EF3 wedge tornado moved through a subdivision near Royse City, severely damaging or destroying multiple homes. In the subdivision, a home sustained mid-range EF3 damage as all of its exterior walls collapsed. A cabinet factory building sustained major structural damage, and other industrial buildings and a gas station were also damaged. Large amounts of structural debris from this area was scattered long distances through fields. Barns and mobile homes were completely destroyed and vehicles were tossed, one of which was thrown into the back of a house. A few additional homes were also sustained major damage farther along the path, and vegetation and trees were defoliated and debarked in some areas. Eight homes were destroyed and 26 others were damaged. Three people were injured. Peak wind speeds were estimated at 150 mph.
EF0	S of Greenville	Hunt	TX	33.04°N 96.14°W	21:27–21:29	0.57 miles (0.92 km)	50 yd (46 m)	A brief tornado remained over open country and caused no damage.
EF0	E of Hagansport	Franklin	TX	33.35°N 95.14°W	21:39–21:45	0.84 miles (1.35 km)	25 yd (23 m)	This tornado uprooted trees near the Sulphur River.
EF0	S of Clarksville	Red River	TX	33.46°N 95.06°W	21:41–21:45	1.41 miles (2.27 km)	25 yd (23 m)	Several trees were snapped or uprooted along the path.
EF0	SW of De Kalb	Bowie	TX	33.43°N 94.71°W	21:44–21:50	2.24 miles (3.60 km)	50 yd (46 m)	Several trees were snapped or uprooted along the path.
EF0	NW of Winnsboro	Hopkins	TX	33.01°N 95.36°W	22:36–22:37	0.54 miles (0.87 km)	25 yd (23 m)	Minor tree damage occurred along the path.
EF0	ESE of Rodessa	Caddo	LA	32.97°N 93.98°W	00:08–00:13	3.08 miles (4.96 km)	50 yd (46 m)	Several trees were snapped or uprooted, some of which fell on buildings. One outbuilding was directly damaged by the tornado.
Sources: SPC Storm Reports for 04/03/12, NWS Dallas/Fort Worth, NWS Shreveport, LA, NCDC Storm Events Database

=== April 5 event ===
List of reported tornadoes - Thursday, April 5, 2012
EF#	Location	County	Coord.	Time (UTC)	Path length	Comments/Damage
Missouri
EF0	E of Netherlands	Pemiscot	36.30°N 89.75°W	1649	0.2 miles (320 m)	Brief tornado with no damage.
EF0	NE of Concord	Pemiscot	36.30°N 89.70°W	1651	300 yards (270 m)	Brief tornado with no damage.
EF0	NNW of Portageville	New Madrid	36.44°N 89.70°W	1830	4 miles (6.4 km)	An irrigation system was blown over.
Sources: SPC Storm Reports for 04/05/12, NCDC Storm Events Database

=== April 6 event ===
List of reported tornadoes - Friday, April 6, 2012
EF#	Location	County	Coord.	Time (UTC)	Path length	Comments/Damage
Florida
EF0	NNW of Naples	Collier	26.17°N 81.81°W	1343	0.2 miles (320 m)	Tornado formed as a water spout and moved onshore and caused minor roof damage. Trees and power lines were downed.
Sources: SPC Storm Reports for 04/06/12, NWS Miami, FL

=== April 7 event ===
List of reported tornadoes - Saturday, April 7, 2012
EF#	Location	County	Coord.	Time (UTC)	Path length	Comments/Damage
Texas
EF0	S of Westbrook	Mitchell	32.11°N 101.02°W	2123	1.4 miles (2.3 km)	Trained spotter reported tornado near Highway 163. No damage occurred with this tornado.
EF0	NNW of Sterling City	Mitchell, Sterling	32.09°N 101.03°W	2138	2.4 miles (3.9 km)	Trained spotter reported tornado on the ground near Highway 163. No damage was reported.
EF0	SW of Sterling City (1st tornado)	Sterling	31.69°N 101.13°W	0012	0.8 miles (1.3 km)	Brief rain-wrapped tornado west of Highway 163 caused no damage.
EF0	SW of Sterling City (2nd tornado)	Sterling	31.65°N 101.20°W	0042	1.2 miles (1.9 km)	Brief rain-wrapped tornado caused no damage.
Sources: SPC Storm Reports for 04/07/12, NWS Midland/Odessa, Texas, NWS San Angelo, TX

=== April 9 event ===
List of reported tornadoes - Monday, April 9, 2012
EF#	Location	County	Coord.	Time (UTC)	Path length	Comments/Damage
Oklahoma
EF0	SSW of Woodward	Woodward	36.39°N 99.41°W	2223	0.1 miles (160 m)	No damage was reported.
EF1	S of Woodward	Woodward	36.36°N 99.37°W	2235	0.2 miles (320 m)	A camper was rolled over and minor damage occurred to a structure. A few trees were downed as well.
EF0	NNW of Sharon	Woodward	36.35°N 99.36°W	2245	0.2 miles (320 m)	Multiple-vortex tornado with no damage.
EF0	NE of Sharon	Woodward	36.29°N 99.33°W	2256	0.2 miles (320 m)	No damage was reported.
EF1	ESE of Sharon	Woodward	36.27°N 99.27°W	2306	0.2 miles (320 m)	A metal shed was destroyed and a roof was partially removed from a home.
EF0	SW of Mutual	Woodward	36.22°N 99.18°W	2327	0.1 miles (160 m)	No damage was reported.
Sources: SPC Storm Reports for 04/09/12, NCDC Storm Events Database

=== April 11 event ===
List of reported tornadoes - Wednesday, April 11, 2012
EF#	Location	County	Coord.	Time (UTC)	Path length	Comments/Damage
Texas
EF0	SW of Henderson	Rusk	32.09°N 94.90°W	1951	2.5 miles (4.0 km)	Trees and power lines were knocked down.
EF0	WNW of Mount Enterprise	Rusk	31.98°N 94.74°W	2024	1 mile (1.6 km)	Trees were snapped and uprooted.
California
EF1	W of French Camp	San Joaquin	37.88°N 121.34°W	1951	1 mile (1.6 km)	A garage was completely destroyed, an empty tractor trailer was overturned, and shingles were removed from the roof of a home.
Sources: SPC Storm Reports for 04/11/12, NWS Shreveport, LA, NWS Sacramento, CA

=== April 12 event ===
List of reported tornadoes - Thursday, April 12, 2012
EF#	Location	County	Coord.	Time (UTC)	Path length	Comments/Damage
Nebraska
EF0	NW of Trenton	Hitchcock	40.21°N 101.05°W	0045	0.25 miles (0.40 km)	Brief touchdown with no damage.
Sources: SPC Storm Reports for 04/12/12, NCDC Storm Events Database

=== April 13 event ===
List of confirmed tornadoes – Friday, April 13, 2012
EF#	Location	County / Parish	State	Start Coord.	Time (UTC)	Path length	Max width	Summary
EF1	Norman	McClain, Cleveland	OK	35.22°N 97.44°W	2059-2112	5.5 miles (8.9 km)	600 yd (550 m)	This tornado caused considerable damage in Norman, and was broadcast live on television via news helicopter. Numerous homes and businesses sustaining varying degrees of damage along the path, and many trees and power poles were downed. An apartment building had its roof blown off, and a vacant paint store sustained roof loss and exterior wall collapse. Twenty people were injured by the tornado, though only one required hospitalization.
EF0	NNW of Shawnee	Pottawatomie	OK	35.39°N 97.00°W	2224	0.3 miles (0.48 km)	20 yd (18 m)	A small outbuilding was damaged by this brief, weak tornado.
EF0	SE of Blair (1st tornado)	Jackson	OK	34.76°N 99.31°W	2310-2312	0.5 miles (0.80 km)	25 yd (23 m)	Brief tornado remained over open country. No damage was reported.
EF0	SE of Blair (2nd tornado)	Jackson	OK	34.75°N 99.30°W	2314-2316	0.5 miles (0.80 km)	25 yd (23 m)	Brief tornado remained over open country. No damage was reported.
EF0	E of Blair	Jackson	OK	34.78°N 99.21°W	2330-2335	2 miles (3.2 km)	25 yd (23 m)	Tornado remained over open country. No damage was reported.
EF0	SE of Cooperton	Kiowa	OK	34.86°N 98.86°W	0025-0027	0.5 miles (0.80 km)	300 yd (270 m)	Brief tornado remained over open country. No damage was reported.
EF0	S of Cooperton (1st tornado)	Kiowa	OK	34.86°N 98.87°W	0027	0.2 miles (0.32 km)	100 yd (91 m)	Brief tornado remained over open country. No damage was reported; however, the famous stormchaser Hank Schyma was nearly caught by this tornado due to its erratic path.
EF1	S of Cooperton (2nd tornado)	Kiowa	OK	34.85°N 98.89°W	0028-0033	5 miles (8.0 km)	500 yd (460 m)	A silo was damaged and another structure sustained roof damage as a result of this large tornado. Schyma escaped this tornado as it emerges from the west.
EF0	NE of Cooperton	Kiowa	OK	34.94°N 98.84°W	0052-0112	6 miles (9.7 km)	500 yd (460 m)	Large tornado remained over open country, causing no damage.
EF0	SSE of Carnegie (1st tornado)	Caddo	OK	35.02°N 98.56°W	0136-0138	2 miles (3.2 km)	50 yd (46 m)	Tornado remained over open country, causing no damage.
EF0	SSE of Carnegie (2nd tornado)	Caddo	OK	35.00°N 98.55°W	0142	0.3 miles (480 m)	50 yd (46 m)	Tornado remained over open country, causing no damage.
EF0	SSE of Carnegie (3rd tornado)	Caddo	OK	35.01°N 98.55°W	0150-0155	4 miles (6.4 km)	100 yd (91 m)	Tornado remained over open country, causing no damage.
EF1	NNW of Mustang	Canadian	OK	35.40°N 97.74°W	0452-0455	2 miles (3.2 km)	75 yd (69 m)	Numerous frame homes sustained minor damage, mostly to roofs and siding, and had garage doors and windows blown out. One home sustained partial roof loss. Four mobile homes also sustained minor damage, and many trees, fences, and power lines were downed.

EF#	Location	County / Parish	State	Start Coord.	Time (UTC)	Path length	Max width	Summary
EF0	NNE of Carlin	Elko	NV	40.72°N 116.11°W	2330	0.9 miles (1.4 km)		Tornado was photographed on the ground. No damage was reported.
EF0	Yuba City	Sutter	CA	39.14°N 121.62°W	0036	0.125 miles (201 m)		Damage to a car dealership where a roof was peeled off of a service building and the roof landed on the roof of the main dealership building.
Sources: SPC Storm Reports for 04/13/12, NCDC Storm Events Database

=== April 14 event ===
List of confirmed tornadoes – Saturday, April 14, 2012
EF#	Location	County / Parish	State	Start Coord.	Time (UTC)	Path length	Max width	Summary
EF1	NW of Burdett	Pawnee	KS	38.20°N 99.54°W	1638	4.1 miles (6.6 km)		This tornado struck a farmstead, damaging an outbuilding and the roof of a house.
EF1	Rush Center to ESE of Loretta	Rush	KS	38.43°N 99.33°W	1714	17.2 miles (27.7 km)		A pivot sprinkler and a few outbuildings were damaged, and trees were downed along the path.
EF0	S of Russell	Russell	KS	38.83°N 98.85°W	1823-1825	0.75 miles (1.21 km)	75 yd (69 m)	A barn suffered minor damage as a result of this brief, weak tornado.
EF0	NE of Russell	Russell	KS	38.93°N 98.72°W	1834-1838	1.75 miles (2.82 km)	75 yd (69 m)	This tornado remained over open country, causing no damage.
EF0	WSW of Lucas	Russell	KS	39.05°N 98.61°W	1843-1848	3 miles (4.8 km)	75 yd (69 m)	This tornado remained over open country, causing no damage.
EF1	NNE of Dodge City to W of Burdett	Ford, Hodgeman	KS	37.91°N 99.87°W	1857	32.9 miles (52.9 km)		This long-tracked cone tornado remained mostly over open fields, remaining on the ground for over one hour. Barns, outbuildings, and pivot sprinklers sustained damage, and trees were downed along the path.
EF1	S of Tipton	Mitchell	KS	39.32°N 98.46°W	1903	3 miles (4.8 km)		Homes sustained roof and siding damage, and garages and outbuildings were damaged or destroyed. Trees and power poles were downed as well.
EF0	E of Hardy	Nuckolls	NE	40.01°N 97.90°W	1910	3.1 miles (5.0 km)		This tornado remained over open country, causing no damage.
EF1	E of Minneola	Clark	KS	37.41°N 99.74°W	1924	6.3 miles (10.1 km)		Several trees were downed along the path of this tornado.
EF0	NW of Castana	Monona	IA	42.13°N 95.99°W	1928-1929	0.4 miles (0.64 km)	40 yd (37 m)	Brief tornado remained over open country, causing no damage.
EF0	E of Deshler	Thayer	NE	40.15°N 97.68°W	1930	100 yards (91 m)		This brief tornado remained over open country, causing no damage.
EF0	NW of Woodward	Woodward	OK	36.53°N 99.52°W	1949-1953	4 miles (6.4 km)	30 yd (27 m)	This tornado remained over open country, causing no damage.
EF0	N of Alexandria	Thayer	NE	40.27°N 97.39°W	1956	0.3 miles (480 m)		A home and several small outbuildings sustained minor siding and window damage. A grain bin was destroyed, two irrigation pivots were overturned, and several trees and power lines were damaged.
EF1	N of Woodward	Woodward (OK), Harper (KS)	OK, KS	36.53°N 99.39°W	1959-2000	0.5 miles (0.80 km)	30 yd (27 m)	This brief tornado damaged a barn.
EF1	NE of Burdett to SSW of Rush Center	Pawnee, Rush	KS	38.31°N 99.41°W	2024	4.7 miles (7.6 km)		Several trees were downed and an outbuilding was damaged.
EF0	WNW of Freedom	Woodward	OK	36.79°N 99.21°W	2026	0.2 miles (320 m)	30 yd (27 m)	Brief tornado remained over open country, causing no damage.
EF1	SE of Lewis	Edwards	KS	37.83°N 99.20°W	2028	9.4 miles (15.1 km)		Several trees and power lines were downed.
EF0	NNW of Freedom	Woods	OK	36.81°N 99.16°W	2033	0.3 miles (480 m)	30 yd (27 m)	Brief tornado remained over open country, causing no damage.
EF1	E of Coldwater	Comanche, Barber	KS	37.32°N 99.00°W	2059	10.9 miles (17.5 km)		Several trees and power lines were downed and a barn was damaged.
EF0	ENE of Timken	Rush	KS	38.48°N 99.15°W	2104	0.9 miles (1.4 km)		This brief tornado remained over open country and caused no damage.
EF0	SSW of Tangier	Woodward	OK	36.24°N 99.59°W	2118	0.2 miles (320 m)	30 yd (27 m)	Brief tornado remained over open country, causing no damage.
EF0	SSW of Tangier	Woodward	OK	36.27°N 99.57°W	2124	0.2 miles (320 m)	30 yd (27 m)	Brief tornado remained over open country, causing no damage.
EF1	ESE of Seward to NNE of Hudson	Stafford	KS	38.15°N 98.73°W	2125	9.75 miles (15.69 km)		Several trees and power poles were downed along the path.
EF1	NW of Hudson	Stafford	KS	38.10°N 98.77°W	2135	14.4 miles (23.2 km)		Power poles and a few trees were downed along the path.
EF0	NW of Sawyer	Pratt	KS	37.49°N 98.71°W	2144	2.3 miles (3.7 km)		A weak tornado remained over open country and caused no damage.
EF0	Sterling	Johnson	NE	40.46°N 96.37°W	2150	2.75 miles (4.43 km)		This tornado touched down at a baseball field in Sterling, blowing over signs and a concession stand. Trees were uprooted and tree limbs were downed further to the east.
EF0	SSE of Ellinwood	Barton	KS	38.28°N 98.54°W	2150-2151	0.5 miles (0.80 km)	50 yd (46 m)	This brief tornado remained over an open field and caused no damage.
EF2	WSW of Cook	Johnson	NE	40.49°N 96.26°W	2156	5.75 miles (9.25 km)		A house sustained major structural damage, losing its roof and two exterior walls. Debris was scattered a quarter-mile downwind, and nearby large shed was completely destroyed. A pivot irrigation sprinkler was overturned, and many trees and power poles were snapped along the path.
EF0	W of Penalosa	Kingman	KS	37.72°N 98.39°W	2202-2203	0.5 miles (0.80 km)	50 yd (46 m)	This brief tornado remained over an open field and caused no damage.
EF0	ESE of Cook	Johnson, Nehama	NE	40.51°N 96.07°W	2207	3.75 miles (6.04 km)		A few outbuildings were damaged and pivot irrigation sprinklers were overturned. Several trees were downed as well.
EF0	ENE of Cairo	Pratt	KS	37.67°N 98.50°W	2208	2.3 miles (3.7 km)		This tornado remained over open country, causing no damage.
EF0	NE of Mooreland	Woodward	OK	36.52°N 99.11°W	2215	0.2 miles (320 m)	30 yd (27 m)	Brief tornado remained over open country, causing no damage.
EF0	S of North Platte (1st tornado)	Lincoln	NE	41.11°N 100.78°W	2218	0.1 miles (0.16 km)		This tornado remained over open country, causing no damage.
EF1	NW of Nebraska City	Otoe	NE	40.68°N 95.89°W	2221	2 miles (3.2 km)		Seven homes were damaged, including damage to siding, garages, and windows. An outbuilding at a vineyard was partially collapsed with debris scattered hundreds of yards downwind. A machine shed was destroyed, and other outbuildings also sustained damage. Many trees were snapped or uprooted as well.
EF0	NNE of Dickens	Lincoln	NE	40.95°N 100.87°W	2227	100 yards (91 m)		Brief rope tornado remained over open country and caused no damage.
EF0	SSW of North Platte (1st tornado)	Lincoln	NE	41.04°N 100.82°W	2228	100 yards (91 m)		Brief tornado remained over open country, causing no damage.
EF2	W of Percival to S of Tabor	Fremont	IA	40.82°N 95.75°W	2228-2241	12 miles (19 km)	880 yd (800 m)	This half-mile wide wedge tornado caused significant damage in Thurman, where 70% of the structures in town sustained some degree of damage, including 14 homes that were destroyed. Many trees were snapped or uprooted, some of which landed on homes. Four people were injured, including a semi-truck driver who was severely injured after his truck was blown off of Interstate 29 and flipped.
EF0	SSW of North Platte (2nd tornado)	Lincoln	NE	41.04°N 100.82°W	2232	0.5 miles (0.80 km)		This tornado remained over open country, causing no damage.
EF0	S of North Platte (2nd tornado)	Lincoln	NE	41.08°N 100.80°W	2232	0.5 miles (0.80 km)		This tornado remained over open country, causing no damage.
EF4	N of Lyons to N of Salina	Rice, Ellsworth, McPherson, Saline	KS	38.46°N 98.08°W	2233-2336	50.30 mi (80.95 km)	400 yd (0.23 mi)	See section on this tornado – One farmhouse was leveled by this violent tornado.
EF0	SE of North Platte	Lincoln	NE	41.09°N 100.74°W	2247	100 yards (91 m)		This tornado remained over open country, causing no damage.
EF0	ESE of Mooreland	Woodward	OK	36.40°N 99.09°W	2250	0.1 miles (160 m)	20 yd (18 m)	Brief tornado remained over open country, causing no damage.
EF0	ENE of Mooreland	Woodward	OK	36.51°N 98.99°W	2251	0.2 miles (320 m)	50 yd (46 m)	A brief multiple-vortex tornado remained over open country, causing no damage.
EF0	SSW of Waynoka	Major	OK	36.46°N 98.94°W	2301	0.1 miles (160 m)	30 yd (27 m)	Brief tornado remained over open country, causing no damage.
EF1	S of Waynoka	Major, Woods	OK	36.49°N 98.88°W	2306-2320	7 miles (11 km)	150 yd (140 m)	Equipment at an oil field was damaged by this tornado, causing a fire.
EF0	NNE of Oxford	Harlan	NE	40.30°N 99.62°W	2316	1 mile (1.6 km)		This rope tornado remained mainly over open country, though a grain bin was destroyed.
EF0	SE of Waynoka	Woods	OK	36.55°N 98.83°W	2319-2321	1 mile (1.6 km)	75 yd (69 m)	This tornado remained over open country, causing no damage.
EF0	E of Waynoka to NE of Hopeton	Woods	OK	36.59°N 98.70°W	2330-2346	9 miles (14 km)	400 yd (370 m)	This tornado remained over open country, causing no damage.
EF0	NW of Wellfleet to SW of Brady	Lincoln	NE	40.84°N 100.81°W	2336	15 miles (24 km)		An intermittent tornado remained over open country, causing no damage.
EF1	W of Cherokee	Alfalfa	OK	36.69°N 98.52°W	2347-0004	10 miles (16 km)	400 yd (370 m)	This likely significant tornado was photographed and caught on video by many storm chasers, though it avoided well-built structures. Farm equipment, two metal barns, and some outbuildings were damaged or destroyed.
EF0	N of New Cambria	Saline	KS	38.88°N 97.50°W	2350-2351	0.25 miles (400 m)	50 yd (46 m)	This brief tornado remained over open country, causing no damage.
EF2	SW of Cromwell to NE of Creston	Adams, Union	IA	41.07°N 94.36°W	2352-0019	16.54 miles (26.62 km)	700 yd (640 m)	A high-end EF2 wedge tornado struck the northwestern part of Creston, causing major damage. Multiple frame homes were severely damaged, and a few manufactured homes were completely swept away and destroyed. Apartment buildings and condominiums sustained major structural damage, and vehicles were flipped and tossed in parking lots. The Green Hills Education Agency building had total roof loss and collapse of masonry exterior walls, while the Greater Regional Medical Center also sustained major roof and exterior wall damage. The tornado inflicted significant damage to buildings at the Southwestern Community College campus, and many trees were snapped or uprooted. Farmsteads outside of town also sustained damage, including one where a small and frail home was leveled. 10 people were injured.
EF0	N of Kingman	Kingman	KS	37.69°N 98.11°W	2355	0.25 miles (0.40 km)		This tornado remained over open country, causing no damage.
EF1	NNE of New Cambria to SW of Manchester	Saline, Ottawa, Dickinson	KS	38.95°N 97.42°W	2355-0007	6.75 miles (10.86 km)	100 yd (91 m)	A large tornado blew the roof off of a farmhouse, which also sustained damage from projectiles. Nearby outbuildings were destroyed, and a hay baler was overturned. A gas transfer station near Niles was also damaged, and many trees and power poles were downed. Several other farmsteads sustained outbuilding damage along the path. This tornado was likely strong, though it avoided well-built structures.
EF0	NW of Cherokee to NW of Amorita	Alfalfa	OK	36.78°N 98.39°W	2357-0023	12 miles (19 km)	400 yd (370 m)	This tornado occurred simultaneously with the previous tornado. Several trees and outbuildings were damaged.
EF0	N of Pretty Prairie	Reno	KS	37.81°N 98.02°W	0010-0011	0.25 miles (400 m)	50 yd (46 m)	This brief tornado remained over open country, causing no damage.
EF0	ENE of Manchester	Dickinson	KS	39.14°N 97.17°W	0031	3 miles (4.8 km)		This brief tornado remained over open country, causing no damage.
EF0	NNW of Anselmo	Custer	NE	41.65°N 99.82°W	0038	0.1 miles (160 m)		Brief tornado remained over open country, causing no damage.
EF1	E of New Virginia	Warren	IA	41.19°N 93.67°W	0054-0056	1 mile (1.6 km)		This tornado flipped several camper trailers and caused major damage to farm outbuildings.
EF0	ESE of Moundridge	McPherson	KS	38.19°N 97.49°W	0103-0104	1 mile (1.6 km)	100 yd (91 m)	This brief tornado remained over open country, causing no damage.
EF1	E of Moundridge to W of Goessel	McPherson, Marion	KS	38.20°N 97.47°W	0105-0118	7 miles (11 km)	250 yd (230 m)	Numerous outbuildings were damaged or destroyed at a farmstead, and a house sustained damage to its roof. A barn was also damaged.
EF1	E of Byron, OK to NE of Danville, KS	Alfalfa (OK), Grant (OK), Harper (KS)	OK, KS	36.90°N 98.22°W	0119-0220	36.6 miles (58.9 km)	1,000 yd (910 m)	This large, long-tracked, and likely significant stovepipe tornado began in Oklahoma before crossing into Kansas, passing near the towns of Amorita, Manchester, Bluff City and Anthony. Damage was limited to trees in Oklahoma, though farmsteads sustained considerable damage in Kansas. A small semi-truck at a farm was tossed 140 yards over a fence, and a nearby home had windows blown out and lost most of its roof shingles. A pickup truck and a tractor were moved as well. At a second farmstead, a house had one of its exterior garage walls blown out, broken windows, and sustained damage from a tree falling onto it. A second nearby home sustained partial roof removal, while a small airplane hangar, metal sheds, and a barn were also destroyed. At an abandoned farmstead, a home sustained major structural damage. Many trees were snapped or uprooted as well.
EF3	WNW of Greensburg to E of Macksville	Kiowa, Edwards, Stafford	KS	37.62°N 99.33°W	0127	48 miles (77 km)	1,720 yd (1,570 m)	See section on this tornado family.
EF1	NE of Greensburg	Kiowa	KS	37.68°N 99.25°W	0140	4.9 miles (7.9 km)	75 yd (69 m)	See section on this tornado family – This was a satellite tornado to the EF3 tornado that touched down at 0127 UTC.
EF1	Marion Reservoir to WNW of Burdick	Marion, Morris	KS	38.42°N 97.13°W	0141-0201	17 miles (27 km)	250 yd (230 m)	This tornado passed near Pilsen and Lost Springs, sweeping away a garage and destroying barns and outbuildings. A concrete block grain elevator was destroyed, homes had windows blown out and siding ripped off, and trees were snapped and uprooted.
EF3	E of Macksville to W of Lyons	Stafford, Rice	KS	38.21°N 98.47°W	0210	39.67 mi (63.84 km)	2,640 yd (2,410 m)	See section on this tornado family.
EF3	SE of Freeport to W of Conway Springs	Harper, Sumner	KS	37.15°N 97.80°W	0210-0240	18 miles (29 km)	400 yd (370 m)	This strong EF3 wedge tornado nearly a 1/2 mile wide passed near Argonia and swept away a two-story home. Only the basement was left behind, though the house was poorly anchored and vehicles parked at the residence were not moved, and sustained damage only from flying debris. Another two-story home had its roof and porch torn off, and had its exterior damaged by projectiles. Large trees were downed, outbuildings were destroyed, and an RV camper was thrown 100 yards and stripped down to its frame. A small twig was found embedded into the trunk of a tree, and a small piece of metal was found speared into another tree.
EF1	N of Oskaloosa	Mahaska	IA	41.25°N 92.51°W	0222-0224	1.3 miles (2.1 km)		This tornado was embedded in a larger area of straight-line wind damage, and caused minor to moderate damage along its path.
EF1	NE of Saint John	Stafford	KS	38.07°N 98.66°W	0223	6.6 miles (10.6 km)	150 yd (140 m)	See section on this tornado family – Satellite tornado to the previous EF3 tornado that touched down at 0210 UTC.
EF1	NE of Milan to ENE of Conway Springs	Sumner	KS	37.29°N 97.62°W	0232-0246	7 miles (11 km)	100 yd (91 m)	A barn at a farmstead was completely destroyed, while at a second farm, a house sustained major damage to its covered porches and a nearby barn was damaged.
EF1	Hedrick	Keokuk	IA	41.17°N 92.34°W	0235	3 miles (4.8 km)		10 homes were damaged in and around Hedrick, a baseball field in town was damaged, and many trees and power lines were downed. Grain bins and a machine shed were damaged, and a shed was destroyed. A police car was blown into a ditch as well.
EF3	Haysville to W of Andover	Sedgwick	KS	37.54°N 97.34°W	0321-0342	13.2 miles (21.2 km)	1,600 yd (1,500 m)	See section on this tornado – There were 38 injuries and $500 million in damage.
EF3	N of Arnett to NE of Woodward	Ellis, Woodward	OK	36.43°N 99.39°W	0342-0426	34 miles (55 km)	400 yd (370 m)	6 deaths – See section on this tornado – There were 29 injuries.
EF0	N of Lindsborg	Saline	KS	38.59°N 97.70°W	0344-0359	10.5 miles (16.9 km)	100 yd (91 m)	This tornado remained over open country, causing no damage.
EF0	E of Andover	Butler	KS	37.72°N 97.02°W	0349-0351	1 mile (1.6 km)	250 yd (230 m)	A large but brief tornado remained over open country, causing no damage.
EF0	NE of Andover	Butler	KS	37.78°N 97.06°W	0355-0356	0.3 miles (480 m)	50 yd (46 m)	This brief rope tornado remained over open country, causing no damage.
EF1	SW of El Dorado	Butler	KS	37.74°N 96.96°W	0355-0404	4.5 miles (7.2 km)	100 yd (91 m)	Several horse barns at a farm were damaged.
EF0	ENE of El Dorado	Butler	KS	37.90°N 96.74°W	0410-0439	15 miles (24 km)	250 yd (230 m)	This large tornado remained over open county along its path, causing no damage.
EF1	SE of Kanopolis	Ellsworth	KS	38.65°N 98.13°W	0416-0426	7.5 miles (12.1 km)	100 yd (91 m)	A trailer home sustained major damage, and some trees were damaged as well.
EF1	NNW of Pleasant Dale	Seward	NE	40.86°N 96.94°W	0426	2.3 miles (3.7 km)		Several outbuildings were destroyed. Homes suffered minor damage and trees were downed along the path.
EF0	SW of Olpe	Lyon	KS	38.22°N 96.22°W	0506	50 yards (46 m)		A brief tornado touched down in an open field, causing no damage.

=== April 15 event ===
List of confirmed tornadoes – Sunday, April 15, 2012
EF#	Location	County / Parish	State	Start Coord.	Time (UTC)	Path length	Max width	Summary
EF1	N of South Bend	Cass, Sarpy	NE	41.01°N 96.24°W	0518	1.9 miles (3.1 km)		Trees were downed and a few outbuildings were damaged along the path.
EF1	SW of McClelland	Pottawattamie	IA	41.27°N 95.74°W	0555	1 mile (1.6 km)		This tornado caused considerable damage at the Westfair Amphitheater, where bleachers were ripped from their anchors and thrown. Many outbuildings and trees were damaged as well.
EF1	SW of Skiatook	Osage	OK	36.33°N 96.05°W	1049	4.2 miles (6.8 km)		A metal hangar was damaged and several trees were snapped or uprooted.
EF1	SSE of Tahlequah	Cherokee, Adair	OK	35.78°N 94.92°W	1422	14.5 miles (23.3 km)		One mobile home was destroyed and homes sustained roof damage. A few outbuildings were destroyed, and trees and tree limbs were snapped.
EF0	W of Litchfield	Sherman	NE	41.17°N 99.19°W	1648	0.5 miles (0.80 km)		A metal building at a farmstead was damaged.
EF0	ESE of Ord	Valley	NE	41.58°N 98.83°W	1737	100 yards (91 m)		Brief tornado remained over open country, causing no damage.
EF0	NE of Ericson	Wheeler	NE	41.83°N 98.60°W	1805	0.25 miles (0.40 km)		A pole barn sustained major damage, and the roof of another outbuilding was destroyed.
EF0	NNE of Bartlett	Wheeler	NE	42.00°N 98.48°W	1855	0.15 miles (0.24 km)		Brief tornado remained over open country, causing no damage.
EF0	SSW of Verdigre	Knox	NE	42.58°N 98.04°W	1927	0.4 miles (0.64 km)		Brief tornado remained over open country, causing no damage.
EF0	WNW of Santee	Knox	NE	42.84°N 97.86°W	1935	0.4 miles (0.64 km)		Brief tornado near Lewis and Clark Lake caused no damage.
EF0	NE of Springfield	Bon Homme	SD	42.87°N 97.85°W	1940	0.5 miles (0.80 km)		Brief rope tornado remained over open country, causing no damage.
EF0	ENE of Minneota	Lyon	MN	44.59°N 95.89°W	2111	0.5 miles (0.80 km)		Brief tornado remained over open country, causing no damage.
EF1	SE of Morganton	Van Buren	AR	35.45°N 92.29°W	2311	2.3 miles (3.7 km)		This tornado snapped off or uprooted dozens of trees, tore part of the porch roof off a mobile home, overturned a travel trailer, and caused minor damage to a house and a vacant mobile home.
EF0	SW of Brownton	McLeod	MN	44.71°N 94.38°W	0024	150 yards (140 m)		Brief rope tornado remained over open country, causing no damage.

=== April 16 event ===
List of confirmed tornadoes – Monday, April 16, 2012
EF#	Location	County / Parish	State	Start Coord.	Time (UTC)	Path length	Max width	Summary
EF1	Portland	San Patricio	TX	27.87°N 97.31°W	1023	2 miles (3.2 km)		This tornado moved through Portland, causing considerable damage. 50 homes were impacted, 8 of which sustained significant damage. Many trees and fences were downed, and vehicles were damaged as well.
EF0	E of Gregory	San Patricio	TX	27.92°N 97.26°W	1050	1 mile (1.6 km)		A fireworks stand was flipped and an outbuilding was damaged.
EF0	NNW of Ingleside	San Patricio	TX	27.92°N 97.23°W	1120	0.5 miles (0.80 km)		This brief tornado damaged a few power poles.
EF0	NE of Riviera	Kleberg	TX	27.31°N 97.74°W	1335	0.5 miles (0.80 km)		Brief tornado remained over open country, causing no damage.
EF0	NNE of Sarita	Kenedy	TX	27.25°N 97.78°W	1337	0.8 miles (1.3 km)		Brief tornado remained over open country, causing no damage.

=== April 20 event ===
EF#	Location	County / Parish	State	Start Coord.	Time (UTC)	Path length	Max width	Summary
EF0	S of Raymondville	Willacy	TX	26.46°N 97.78°W	2245	0.2 miles (320 m)		Brief touchdown with no damage.
EF0	NNE of Rangerville	Cameron	TX	26.12°N 97.73°W	2330	100 yards (91 m)		Brief tornado split a tree.
Sources: SPC Storm Reports for 04/21/12, NWS Grand Forks, NCDC Storm Events Database

=== April 21 event ===
List of reported tornadoes - Saturday, April 21, 2012
EF#	Location	County	Coord.	Time (UTC)	Path length	Comments/Damage
Florida
EF0	St. George Island State Park	Franklin	29.72°N 84.75°W	1416	50 yards (46 m)	Twin waterspouts occurred over open water. One moved onshore and kicked up sand on the beach.
Minnesota
EF0	SE of Kent	Wilkin	46.40°N 96.62°W	1735	0.5 miles (0.80 km)	Damage to a pole barn and a mobile home. A trampoline was blown over and several trees were downed.
EF0	SE of Glyndon	Clay	46.82°N 96.50°W	1741	0.25 miles (400 m)	Tornado hit a pole barn and scattered 4 by 6 foot pieces of tin along a highway.
EF0	NW of Chokio	Stevens	45.61°N 96.22°W	1839	300 yards (270 m)	Brief touchdown with no damage.
EF1	S of Fergus Falls	Otter Tail	46.21°N 96.07°W	1911	2.2 miles (3.5 km)	A shed had its doors ripped away and suffered major roof damage. Three grain bins were blown off of concrete pads.
EF0	S of Big Bend City	Chippewa	45.11°N 95.81°W	1955	0.4 miles (640 m)	A barn and a granary suffered minor damage.
EF0	SW of Lucan	Redwood	44.32°N 95.41°W	2023	0.25 miles (0.40 km)	Brief tornado damaged a farmhouse and several other structures. A greenhouse, a pole barn, and a shed were among the damaged structures.
EF0	ENE of Big Bend City	Swift	45.16°N 95.69°W	2028	1.2 miles (1.9 km)	Brief touchdown with no damage.
EF0	SSW of Holmes City	Douglas	45.77°N 95.59°W	2030	200 yards (180 m)	Two barns sustained minor damage.
Iowa
EF0	SSE of Spencer	Clay	43.10°N 95.12°W	2127	1.7 miles (2.7 km)	Weak rope tornado with no damage.
EF0	NE of Webb	Clay	43.00°N 94.95°W	2143	0.5 miles (0.80 km)	No damage reported with this tornado.
Sources: SPC Storm Reports for 04/21/12, NWS Grand Forks, NCDC Storm Events Database

=== April 25 event ===
EF#	Location	County	State	Start Coord.	Time (UTC)	Path length	Max width	Summary
EF1	E of Luray	Clark	MO	40.45°N 91.84°W	0105	2 miles (3.2 km)		Two houses and several other structures suffered significant damage.
Sources: SPC Storm Reports for 04/25/12, NCDC Storm Events Database

=== April 26 event ===
List of reported tornadoes - Thursday, April 26, 2012
EF#	Location	County	Coord.	Time (UTC)	Path length	Comments/Damage
Tennessee
EF2	SW of Henderson	Chester	35.37°N 88.70°W	2330	2 miles (3.2 km)	Several homes and farm buildings were damaged. One person suffered minor injuries.
EF0	SW of Franklin	Williamson	35.93°N 86.90°W	0000	3.8 miles (6.1 km)	Several homes and mobile homes were damaged. Vehicles were flipped and trees were downed. 6 minor injuries were reported.
Colorado
EF0	SW of Yoder	El Paso	38.78°N 104.27°W	0131	0.35 miles (0.56 km)	A barn was damaged, metal roofing was scattered, and a few cedar posts were moved.
Sources: SPC Storm Reports for 04/26/12, NWS Nashville

=== April 27 event ===
List of reported tornadoes - Friday, April 27, 2012
EF#	Location	County	Coord.	Time (UTC)	Path length	Comments/Damage
Colorado
EF2	NE of McClave	Bent	38.12°N 102.77°W	0745	6.2 miles (10.0 km)	300 yards (270 m) wide tornado severely damaged three structures and tossed a few horses several yards from where they were picked up. Trees and power lines were downed.
EF2	SW of Lamar	Prowers	37.99°N 102.70°W	0750	2 miles (3.2 km)	18 hog barns were completely destroyed.
EF2	NE of Lamar	Prowers, Kiowa	38.03°N 102.60°W	0758	21 miles (34 km)	Several structures were damaged, some destroyed. An electrical substation and two transmission towers were damaged and a motor home was flipped. Seven people suffered minor injuries.
EF1	Chivington area	Kiowa	38.41°N 102.53°W	0833	2 miles (3.2 km)	Tornado struck a mobile home and a church, causing one injury.
EF2	NE of Chivington	Kiowa	38.48°N 102.49°W	0840	1 mile (1.6 km)	Tornado struck an unoccupied mobile home and several ranch buildings. The mobile home was lifted from the ground and the frame was wrapped around a vehicle.
Kansas
EF0	W of Aurora	Cloud	39.45°N 97.64°W	2138	2 miles (3.2 km)	Brief touchdown with no damage.
EF0	E of Woodruff	Phillips	39.95°N 99.30°W	2143	4.5 miles (7.2 km)	No damage was reported with this tornado.
EF0	NNE of Council Grove	Morris	38.75°N 96.44°W	2259	50 yards (46 m)	Brief touchdown with no damage.
Sources: SPC Storm Reports for 04/26/12, NWS Topeka, KS, NWS Pueblo, CO, NCDC Storm Events Database

=== April 28 event ===
EF#	Location	County / Parish	State	Start Coord.	Time (UTC)	Path length	Max width	Summary
EF0	SW of Aspermont	Stonewall	TX	32.98°N 100.42°W	0145	0.1 miles (160 m)		Brief tornado lifted dirt into the air.
Sources: SPC Storm Reports for 04/28/12, NCDC Storm Events Database

=== April 29 event ===
EF#	Location	County / Parish	State	Start Coord.	Time (UTC)	Path length	Summary
EF1	E of Fairfax	Osage	OK	36.57°N 96.57°W	0157	1.3 miles (2.1 km)	Several large oak trees and four power poles were downed.
Sources: SPC Storm Reports for 04/29/12, NWS Tulsa

=== April 30 event ===
List of reported tornadoes - Monday, April 30, 2012
EF#	Location	County	Coord.	Time (UTC)	Path length	Comments/Damage
Missouri
EF0	NE of Humansville	Hickory	37.82°N 93.56°W	0656	1.2 miles (1.9 km)	Several trees were downed and a barn was destroyed.
Kansas
EF0	SE of Minneola	Clark	37.30°N 99.73°W	2238	0.5 miles (0.80 km)	Brief tornado with no damage.
EF0	N of Dodge City	Ford	37.88°N 100.06°W	2252	50 yards (46 m)	Very brief touchdown with no damage.
EF0	NW of Kinsley	Edwards	37.95°N 99.48°W	2257	0.3 miles (0.48 km)	Brief touchdown with no damage.
EF0	S of Joy	Kiowa	37.56°N 99.40°W	2339	0.7 miles (1.1 km)	Brief touchdown with no damage.
EF0	W of Brenham	Kiowa	37.62°N 99.24°W	0012	0.6 miles (0.97 km)	Brief tornado resulted in no damage.
EF2	E of Buttermilk	Comanche	37.05°N 99.08°W	0045	2.6 miles (4.2 km)	Many trees and power poles were downed and considerable damage occurred to farm equipment and machinery. Some machinery was carried up to half a mile.
Oklahoma
EF0	W of Jet	Alfalfa	36.66°N 98.22°W	0034	0.1 miles (160 m)	No damage was reported.
EF0	NW of Jet	Alfalfa	36.70°N 98.22°W	0040	3.2 miles (5.1 km)	An outbuilding was damaged along the south side of the Great Salt Plains Lake.
EF0	WNW of Nowata	Nowata	36.71°N 95.71°W	0110	0.1 miles (160 m)	Several trees and tree limbs were snapped.
EF1	W of Nowata	Nowata	36.70°N 95.71°W	0112	0.2 miles (320 m)	Several trees were snapped.
EF1	N of Nash to SSE of Wakita	Grant	36.85°N 97.91°W	0113	16 miles (26 km)	Several power lines were downed.
EF0	NW of Nowata	Nowata	36.74°N 95.69°W	0125	0.1 miles (160 m)	No damage was reported.
EF0	NNW of Nowata	Nowata	36.74°N 95.63°W	0133	0.2 miles (320 m)	No damage was reported.
EF1	E of Delaware	Nowata	36.79°N 95.50°W	0159	1.5 miles (2.4 km)	A large barn was damaged and numerous trees were downed.
EF1	SW of Medford	Grant	36.79°N 97.75°W	0206	1 mile (1.6 km)	A large barn was destroyed and many trees and power poles were downed.
EF1	SE of Medford to E of Deer Run	Grant	36.80°N 97.72°W	0210	14 miles (23 km)	Hundreds of power poles were snapped, an electrical substation sustained heavy damage, and the valve of an anhydrous ammonia tank was damaged, causing a leak.
EF1	NE of Nash to N of Pond Creek	Grant	36.71°N 98.01°W	0229	12 miles (19 km)	Several large trees were uprooted.
EF1	SW of Nardin	Kay	36.81°N 97.46°W	0307	2 miles (3.2 km)	Several trees were downed.
EF1	NW of Tonkawa	Kay	36.78°N 97.43°W	0325	7 miles (11 km)	Several outbuildings and one home were heavily damaged and many trees were downed.
Texas
EF0	S of Wellington	Collingsworth	34.75°N 100.21°W	0130	1.25 miles (2.01 km)	Short-lived tornado with no damage
Sources: SPC Storm Reports for 04/29/12, SPC Storm Reports for 04/30/12, NWS Springfield, MO, NWS Tulsa, NWS Amarillo, NCDC Storm Events Database

== See also ==
- Tornadoes of 2012
- List of United States tornadoes in March 2012
- List of United States tornadoes from May to June 2012
