= List of tornadoes in the outbreak of April 13–16, 2012 =

From April 13 to 16, 2012, a major tornado outbreak occurred over most of the Central United States.

== Confirmed tornadoes ==
Confirmed tornadoes by Enhanced Fujita rating
EFU	EF0	EF1	EF2	EF3	EF4	EF5	Total
0	68	36	3	5	1	0	113

=== April 13 event ===
List of confirmed tornadoes – Friday, April 13, 2012 (Note: All dates are based on the local time zone where the tornado touched down; however, all times are in Coordinated Universal Time for consistency.)
EF#	Location	County / Parish	State	Start Coord.	Time (UTC)	Path length	Max width	Summary
EF1	Norman	McClain, Cleveland	OK	35.22°N 97.44°W	2059-2112	5.5 miles (8.9 km)	600 yd (550 m)	This tornado caused considerable damage in Norman, and was broadcast live on television via news helicopter. Numerous homes and businesses sustaining varying degrees of damage along the path, and many trees and power poles were downed. An apartment building had its roof blown off, and a vacant paint store sustained roof loss and exterior wall collapse. Twenty people were injured by the tornado, though only one required hospitalization.
EF0	NNW of Shawnee	Pottawatomie	OK	35.39°N 97.00°W	2224	0.3 miles (0.48 km)	20 yd (18 m)	A small outbuilding was damaged by this brief, weak tornado.
EF0	SE of Blair (1st tornado)	Jackson	OK	34.76°N 99.31°W	2310-2312	0.5 miles (0.80 km)	25 yd (23 m)	Brief tornado remained over open country. No damage was reported.
EF0	SE of Blair (2nd tornado)	Jackson	OK	34.75°N 99.30°W	2314-2316	0.5 miles (0.80 km)	25 yd (23 m)	Brief tornado remained over open country. No damage was reported.
EF0	E of Blair	Jackson	OK	34.78°N 99.21°W	2330-2335	2 miles (3.2 km)	25 yd (23 m)	Tornado remained over open country. No damage was reported.
EF0	SE of Cooperton	Kiowa	OK	34.86°N 98.86°W	0025-0027	0.5 miles (0.80 km)	300 yd (270 m)	Brief tornado remained over open country. No damage was reported.
EF0	S of Cooperton (1st tornado)	Kiowa	OK	34.86°N 98.87°W	0027	0.2 miles (0.32 km)	100 yd (91 m)	Brief tornado remained over open country. No damage was reported; however, the famous stormchaser Hank Schyma was nearly caught by this tornado due to its erratic path.
EF1	S of Cooperton (2nd tornado)	Kiowa	OK	34.85°N 98.89°W	0028-0033	5 miles (8.0 km)	500 yd (460 m)	A silo was damaged and another structure sustained roof damage as a result of this large tornado. Schyma escaped this tornado as it emerges from the west.
EF0	NE of Cooperton	Kiowa	OK	34.94°N 98.84°W	0052-0112	6 miles (9.7 km)	500 yd (460 m)	Large tornado remained over open country, causing no damage.
EF0	SSE of Carnegie (1st tornado)	Caddo	OK	35.02°N 98.56°W	0136-0138	2 miles (3.2 km)	50 yd (46 m)	Tornado remained over open country, causing no damage.
EF0	SSE of Carnegie (2nd tornado)	Caddo	OK	35.00°N 98.55°W	0142	0.3 miles (480 m)	50 yd (46 m)	Tornado remained over open country, causing no damage.
EF0	SSE of Carnegie (3rd tornado)	Caddo	OK	35.01°N 98.55°W	0150-0155	4 miles (6.4 km)	100 yd (91 m)	Tornado remained over open country, causing no damage.
EF1	NNW of Mustang	Canadian	OK	35.40°N 97.74°W	0452-0455	2 miles (3.2 km)	75 yd (69 m)	Numerous frame homes sustained minor damage, mostly to roofs and siding, and had garage doors and windows blown out. One home sustained partial roof loss. Four mobile homes also sustained minor damage, and many trees, fences, and power lines were downed.

=== April 14 event ===
List of confirmed tornadoes – Saturday, April 14, 2012
EF#	Location	County / Parish	State	Start Coord.	Time (UTC)	Path length	Max width	Summary
EF1	NW of Burdett	Pawnee	KS	38.20°N 99.54°W	1638	4.1 miles (6.6 km)		This tornado struck a farmstead, damaging an outbuilding and the roof of a house.
EF1	Rush Center to ESE of Loretto	Rush	KS	38.43°N 99.33°W	1714	17.2 miles (27.7 km)		A pivot sprinkler and a few outbuildings were damaged, and trees were downed along the path.
EF0	S of Russell	Russell	KS	38.83°N 98.85°W	1823-1825	0.75 miles (1.21 km)	75 yd (69 m)	A barn suffered minor damage as a result of this brief, weak tornado.
EF0	NE of Russell	Russell	KS	38.93°N 98.72°W	1834-1838	1.75 miles (2.82 km)	75 yd (69 m)	This tornado remained over open country, causing no damage.
EF0	WSW of Lucas	Russell	KS	39.05°N 98.61°W	1843-1848	3 miles (4.8 km)	75 yd (69 m)	This tornado remained over open country, causing no damage.
EF1	NNE of Dodge City to W of Burdett	Ford, Hodgeman	KS	37.91°N 99.87°W	1857	32.9 miles (52.9 km)		This long-tracked cone tornado remained mostly over open fields, remaining on the ground for over one hour. Barns, outbuildings, and pivot sprinklers sustained damage, and trees were downed along the path.
EF1	S of Tipton	Mitchell	KS	39.32°N 98.46°W	1903	3 miles (4.8 km)		Homes sustained roof and siding damage, and garages and outbuildings were damaged or destroyed. Trees and power poles were downed as well.
EF0	E of Hardy	Nuckolls	NE	40.01°N 97.90°W	1910	3.1 miles (5.0 km)		This tornado remained over open country, causing no damage.
EF1	E of Minneola	Clark	KS	37.41°N 99.74°W	1924	6.3 miles (10.1 km)		Several trees were downed along the path of this tornado.
EF0	NW of Castana	Monona	IA	42.13°N 95.99°W	1928-1929	0.4 miles (0.64 km)	40 yd (37 m)	Brief tornado remained over open country, causing no damage.
EF0	E of Deshler	Thayer	NE	40.15°N 97.68°W	1930	100 yards (91 m)		This brief tornado remained over open country, causing no damage.
EF0	NW of Woodward	Woodward	OK	36.53°N 99.52°W	1949-1953	4 miles (6.4 km)	30 yd (27 m)	This tornado remained over open country, causing no damage.
EF0	N of Alexandria	Thayer	NE	40.27°N 97.39°W	1956	0.3 miles (480 m)		A home and several small outbuildings sustained minor siding and window damage. A grain bin was destroyed, two irrigation pivots were overturned, and several trees and power lines were damaged.
EF1	N of Woodward	Woodward (OK), Harper (KS)	OK, KS	36.53°N 99.39°W	1959-2000	0.5 miles (0.80 km)	30 yd (27 m)	This brief tornado damaged a barn.
EF1	NE of Burdett to SSW of Rush Center	Pawnee, Rush	KS	38.31°N 99.41°W	2024	4.7 miles (7.6 km)		Several trees were downed and an outbuilding was damaged.
EF0	WNW of Freedom	Woodward	OK	36.79°N 99.21°W	2026	0.2 miles (320 m)	30 yd (27 m)	Brief tornado remained over open country, causing no damage.
EF1	SE of Lewis	Edwards	KS	37.83°N 99.20°W	2028	9.4 miles (15.1 km)		Several trees and power lines were downed.
EF0	NNW of Freedom	Woods	OK	36.81°N 99.16°W	2033	0.3 miles (480 m)	30 yd (27 m)	Brief tornado remained over open country, causing no damage.
EF1	E of Coldwater	Comanche, Barber	KS	37.32°N 99.00°W	2059	10.9 miles (17.5 km)		Several trees and power lines were downed and a barn was damaged.
EF0	ENE of Timken	Rush	KS	38.48°N 99.15°W	2104	0.9 miles (1.4 km)		This brief tornado remained over open country and caused no damage.
EF0	SSW of Tangier	Woodward	OK	36.24°N 99.59°W	2118	0.2 miles (320 m)	30 yd (27 m)	Brief tornado remained over open country, causing no damage.
EF0	SSW of Tangier	Woodward	OK	36.27°N 99.57°W	2124	0.2 miles (320 m)	30 yd (27 m)	Brief tornado remained over open country, causing no damage.
EF1	ESE of Seward to NNE of Hudson	Stafford	KS	38.15°N 98.73°W	2125	9.75 miles (15.69 km)		Several trees and power poles were downed along the path.
EF1	NW of Hudson	Stafford	KS	38.10°N 98.77°W	2135	14.4 miles (23.2 km)		Power poles and a few trees were downed along the path.
EF0	NW of Sawyer	Pratt	KS	37.49°N 98.71°W	2144	2.3 miles (3.7 km)		A weak tornado remained over open country and caused no damage.
EF0	Sterling	Johnson	NE	40.46°N 96.37°W	2150	2.75 miles (4.43 km)		This tornado touched down at a baseball field in Sterling, blowing over signs and a concession stand. Trees were uprooted and tree limbs were downed further to the east.
EF0	SSE of Ellinwood	Barton	KS	38.28°N 98.54°W	2150-2151	0.5 miles (0.80 km)	50 yd (46 m)	This brief tornado remained over an open field and caused no damage.
EF2	WSW of Cook	Johnson	NE	40.49°N 96.26°W	2156	5.75 miles (9.25 km)		A house sustained major structural damage, losing its roof and two exterior walls. Debris was scattered a quarter-mile downwind, and nearby large shed was completely destroyed. A pivot irrigation sprinkler was overturned, and many trees and power poles were snapped along the path.
EF0	W of Penalosa	Kingman	KS	37.72°N 98.39°W	2202-2203	0.5 miles (0.80 km)	50 yd (46 m)	This brief tornado remained over an open field and caused no damage.
EF0	ESE of Cook	Johnson, Nehama	NE	40.51°N 96.07°W	2207	3.75 miles (6.04 km)		A few outbuildings were damaged and pivot irrigation sprinklers were overturned. Several trees were downed as well.
EF0	ENE of Cairo	Pratt	KS	37.67°N 98.50°W	2208	2.3 miles (3.7 km)		This tornado remained over open country, causing no damage.
EF0	NE of Mooreland	Woodward	OK	36.52°N 99.11°W	2215	0.2 miles (320 m)	30 yd (27 m)	Brief tornado remained over open country, causing no damage.
EF0	S of North Platte (1st tornado)	Lincoln	NE	41.11°N 100.78°W	2218	0.1 miles (0.16 km)		This tornado remained over open country, causing no damage.
EF1	NW of Nebraska City	Otoe	NE	40.68°N 95.89°W	2221	2 miles (3.2 km)		Seven homes were damaged, including damage to siding, garages, and windows. An outbuilding at a vineyard was partially collapsed with debris scattered hundreds of yards downwind. A machine shed was destroyed, and other outbuildings also sustained damage. Many trees were snapped or uprooted as well.
EF0	NNE of Dickens	Lincoln	NE	40.95°N 100.87°W	2227	100 yards (91 m)		Brief rope tornado remained over open country and caused no damage.
EF0	SSW of North Platte (1st tornado)	Lincoln	NE	41.04°N 100.82°W	2228	100 yards (91 m)		Brief tornado remained over open country, causing no damage.
EF2	W of Percival to S of Tabor	Fremont	IA	40.82°N 95.75°W	2228-2241	12 miles (19 km)	880 yd (800 m)	This half-mile wide wedge tornado caused significant damage in Thurman, where 70% of the structures in town sustained some degree of damage, including 14 homes that were destroyed. Many trees were snapped or uprooted, some of which landed on homes. Four people were injured, including a semi-truck driver who was severely injured after his truck was blown off of Interstate 29 and flipped.
EF0	SSW of North Platte (2nd tornado)	Lincoln	NE	41.04°N 100.82°W	2232	0.5 miles (0.80 km)		This tornado remained over open country, causing no damage.
EF0	S of North Platte (2nd tornado)	Lincoln	NE	41.08°N 100.80°W	2232	0.5 miles (0.80 km)		This tornado remained over open country, causing no damage.
EF4	N of Lyons to N of Salina	Rice, Ellsworth, McPherson, Saline	KS	38.46°N 98.08°W	2233-2336	50.30 mi (80.95 km)	400 yd (0.23 mi)	See section on this tornado – One farmhouse was leveled by this violent tornado.
EF0	SE of North Platte	Lincoln	NE	41.09°N 100.74°W	2247	100 yards (91 m)		This tornado remained over open country, causing no damage.
EF0	ESE of Mooreland	Woodward	OK	36.40°N 99.09°W	2250	0.1 miles (160 m)	20 yd (18 m)	Brief tornado remained over open country, causing no damage.
EF0	ENE of Mooreland	Woodward	OK	36.51°N 98.99°W	2251	0.2 miles (320 m)	50 yd (46 m)	A brief multiple-vortex tornado remained over open country, causing no damage.
EF0	SSW of Waynoka	Major	OK	36.46°N 98.94°W	2301	0.1 miles (160 m)	30 yd (27 m)	Brief tornado remained over open country, causing no damage.
EF1	S of Waynoka	Major, Woods	OK	36.49°N 98.88°W	2306-2320	7 miles (11 km)	150 yd (140 m)	Equipment at an oil field was damaged by this tornado, causing a fire.
EF0	NNE of Oxford	Harlan	NE	40.30°N 99.62°W	2316	1 mile (1.6 km)		This rope tornado remained mainly over open country, though a grain bin was destroyed.
EF0	SE of Waynoka	Woods	OK	36.55°N 98.83°W	2319-2321	1 mile (1.6 km)	75 yd (69 m)	This tornado remained over open country, causing no damage.
EF0	E of Waynoka to NE of Hopeton	Woods	OK	36.59°N 98.70°W	2330-2346	9 miles (14 km)	400 yd (370 m)	This tornado remained over open country, causing no damage.
EF0	NW of Wellfleet to SW of Brady	Lincoln	NE	40.84°N 100.81°W	2336	15 miles (24 km)		An intermittent tornado remained over open country, causing no damage.
EF1	W of Cherokee	Alfalfa	OK	36.69°N 98.52°W	2347-0004	10 miles (16 km)	400 yd (370 m)	This likely significant tornado was photographed and caught on video by many storm chasers, though it avoided well-built structures. Farm equipment, two metal barns, and some outbuildings were damaged or destroyed.
EF0	N of New Cambria	Saline	KS	38.88°N 97.50°W	2350-2351	0.25 miles (400 m)	50 yd (46 m)	This brief tornado remained over open country, causing no damage.
EF2	SW of Cromwell to NE of Creston	Adams, Union	IA	41.07°N 94.36°W	2352-0019	16.54 miles (26.62 km)	700 yd (640 m)	A high-end EF2 wedge tornado struck the northwestern part of Creston, causing major damage. Multiple frame homes were severely damaged, and a few manufactured homes were completely swept away and destroyed. Apartment buildings and condominiums sustained major structural damage, and vehicles were flipped and tossed in parking lots. The Green Hills Education Agency building had total roof loss and collapse of masonry exterior walls, while the Greater Regional Medical Center also sustained major roof and exterior wall damage. The tornado inflicted significant damage to buildings at the Southwestern Community College campus, and many trees were snapped or uprooted. Farmsteads outside of town also sustained damage, including one where a small and frail home was leveled. 10 people were injured.
EF0	N of Kingman	Kingman	KS	37.69°N 98.11°W	2355	0.25 miles (0.40 km)		This tornado remained over open country, causing no damage.
EF1	NNE of New Cambria to SW of Manchester	Saline, Ottawa, Dickinson	KS	38.95°N 97.42°W	2355-0007	6.75 miles (10.86 km)	100 yd (91 m)	A large tornado blew the roof off of a farmhouse, which also sustained damage from projectiles. Nearby outbuildings were destroyed, and a hay baler was overturned. A gas transfer station near Niles was also damaged, and many trees and power poles were downed. Several other farmsteads sustained outbuilding damage along the path. This tornado was likely strong, though it avoided well-built structures.
EF0	NW of Cherokee to NW of Amorita	Alfalfa	OK	36.78°N 98.39°W	2357-0023	12 miles (19 km)	400 yd (370 m)	This tornado occurred simultaneously with the previous tornado. Several trees and outbuildings were damaged.
EF0	N of Pretty Prairie	Reno	KS	37.81°N 98.02°W	0010-0011	0.25 miles (400 m)	50 yd (46 m)	This brief tornado remained over open country, causing no damage.
EF0	ENE of Manchester	Dickinson	KS	39.14°N 97.17°W	0031	3 miles (4.8 km)		This brief tornado remained over open country, causing no damage.
EF0	NNW of Anselmo	Custer	NE	41.65°N 99.82°W	0038	0.1 miles (160 m)		Brief tornado remained over open country, causing no damage.
EF1	E of New Virginia	Warren	IA	41.19°N 93.67°W	0054-0056	1 mile (1.6 km)		This tornado flipped several camper trailers and caused major damage to farm outbuildings.
EF0	ESE of Moundridge	McPherson	KS	38.19°N 97.49°W	0103-0104	1 mile (1.6 km)	100 yd (91 m)	This brief tornado remained over open country, causing no damage.
EF1	E of Moundridge to W of Goessel	McPherson, Marion	KS	38.20°N 97.47°W	0105-0118	7 miles (11 km)	250 yd (230 m)	Numerous outbuildings were damaged or destroyed at a farmstead, and a house sustained damage to its roof. A barn was also damaged.
EF1	E of Byron, OK to NE of Danville, KS	Alfalfa (OK), Grant (OK), Harper (KS)	OK, KS	36.90°N 98.22°W	0119-0220	36.6 miles (58.9 km)	1,000 yd (910 m)	This large, long-tracked, and likely significant stovepipe tornado began in Oklahoma before crossing into Kansas, passing near the towns of Amorita, Manchester, Bluff City and Anthony. Damage was limited to trees in Oklahoma, though farmsteads sustained considerable damage in Kansas. A small semi-truck at a farm was tossed 140 yards over a fence, and a nearby home had windows blown out and lost most of its roof shingles. A pickup truck and a tractor were moved as well. At a second farmstead, a house had one of its exterior garage walls blown out, broken windows, and sustained damage from a tree falling onto it. A second nearby home sustained partial roof removal, while a small airplane hangar, metal sheds, and a barn were also destroyed. At an abandoned farmstead, a home sustained major structural damage. Many trees were snapped or uprooted as well.
EF3	WNW of Greensburg to E of Macksville	Kiowa, Edwards, Stafford	KS	37.62°N 99.33°W	0127	48 miles (77 km)	1,720 yd (1,570 m)	See section on this tornado family.
EF1	NE of Greensburg	Kiowa	KS	37.68°N 99.25°W	0140	4.9 miles (7.9 km)	75 yd (69 m)	See section on this tornado family – This was a satellite tornado to the EF3 tornado that touched down at 0127 UTC.
EF1	Marion Reservoir to WNW of Burdick	Marion, Morris	KS	38.42°N 97.13°W	0141-0201	17 miles (27 km)	250 yd (230 m)	This tornado passed near Pilsen and Lost Springs, sweeping away a garage and destroying barns and outbuildings. A concrete block grain elevator was destroyed, homes had windows blown out and siding ripped off, and trees were snapped and uprooted.
EF3	E of Macksville to W of Lyons	Stafford, Rice	KS	38.21°N 98.47°W	0210	39.67 mi (63.84 km)	2,640 yd (2,410 m)	See section on this tornado family.
EF3	SE of Freeport to W of Conway Springs	Harper, Sumner	KS	37.15°N 97.80°W	0210-0240	18 miles (29 km)	400 yd (370 m)	This strong EF3 wedge tornado nearly a 1/2 mile wide passed near Argonia and swept away a two-story home. Only the basement was left behind, though the house was poorly anchored and vehicles parked at the residence were not moved, and sustained damage only from flying debris. Another two-story home had its roof and porch torn off, and had its exterior damaged by projectiles. Large trees were downed, outbuildings were destroyed, and an RV camper was thrown 100 yards and stripped down to its frame. A small twig was found embedded into the trunk of a tree, and a small piece of metal was found speared into another tree.
EF1	N of Oskaloosa	Mahaska	IA	41.25°N 92.51°W	0222-0224	1.3 miles (2.1 km)		This tornado was embedded in a larger area of straight-line wind damage, and caused minor to moderate damage along its path.
EF1	NE of Saint John	Stafford	KS	38.07°N 98.66°W	0223	6.6 miles (10.6 km)	150 yd (140 m)	See section on this tornado family – Satellite tornado to the previous EF3 tornado that touched down at 0210 UTC.
EF1	NE of Milan to ENE of Conway Springs	Sumner	KS	37.29°N 97.62°W	0232-0246	7 miles (11 km)	100 yd (91 m)	A barn at a farmstead was completely destroyed, while at a second farm, a house sustained major damage to its covered porches and a nearby barn was damaged.
EF1	Hedrick	Keokuk	IA	41.17°N 92.34°W	0235	3 miles (4.8 km)		10 homes were damaged in and around Hedrick, a baseball field in town was damaged, and many trees and power lines were downed. Grain bins and a machine shed were damaged, and a shed was destroyed. A police car was blown into a ditch as well.
EF3	Haysville to W of Andover	Sedgwick	KS	37.54°N 97.34°W	0321-0342	13.2 miles (21.2 km)	1,600 yd (1,500 m)	See section on this tornado – There were 38 injuries and $500 million in damage.
EF3	N of Arnett to NE of Woodward	Ellis, Woodward	OK	36.43°N 99.39°W	0342-0426	34 miles (55 km)	400 yd (370 m)	6 deaths – See article on this tornado – There were 29 injuries.
EF0	N of Lindsborg	Saline	KS	38.59°N 97.70°W	0344-0359	10.5 miles (16.9 km)	100 yd (91 m)	This tornado remained over open country, causing no damage.
EF0	E of Andover	Butler	KS	37.72°N 97.02°W	0349-0351	1 mile (1.6 km)	250 yd (230 m)	A large but brief tornado remained over open country, causing no damage.
EF0	NE of Andover	Butler	KS	37.78°N 97.06°W	0355-0356	0.3 miles (480 m)	50 yd (46 m)	This brief rope tornado remained over open country, causing no damage.
EF1	SW of El Dorado	Butler	KS	37.74°N 96.96°W	0355-0404	4.5 miles (7.2 km)	100 yd (91 m)	Several horse barns at a farm were damaged.
EF0	ENE of El Dorado	Butler	KS	37.90°N 96.74°W	0410-0439	15 miles (24 km)	250 yd (230 m)	This large tornado remained over open county along its path, causing no damage.
EF1	SE of Kanopolis	Ellsworth	KS	38.65°N 98.13°W	0416-0426	7.5 miles (12.1 km)	100 yd (91 m)	A trailer home sustained major damage, and some trees were damaged as well.
EF1	NNW of Pleasant Dale	Seward	NE	40.86°N 96.94°W	0426	2.3 miles (3.7 km)		Several outbuildings were destroyed. Homes suffered minor damage and trees were downed along the path.
EF0	SW of Olpe	Lyon	KS	38.22°N 96.22°W	0506	50 yards (46 m)		A brief tornado touched down in an open field, causing no damage.

=== April 15 event ===
List of confirmed tornadoes – Sunday, April 15, 2012
EF#	Location	County / Parish	State	Start Coord.	Time (UTC)	Path length	Max width	Summary
EF1	N of South Bend	Cass, Sarpy	NE	41.01°N 96.24°W	0518	1.9 miles (3.1 km)		Trees were downed and a few outbuildings were damaged along the path.
EF1	SW of McClelland	Pottawattamie	IA	41.27°N 95.74°W	0555	1 mile (1.6 km)		This tornado caused considerable damage at the Westfair Amphitheater, where bleachers were ripped from their anchors and thrown. Many outbuildings and trees were damaged as well.
EF1	SW of Skiatook	Osage	OK	36.33°N 96.05°W	1049	4.2 miles (6.8 km)		A metal hangar was damaged and several trees were snapped or uprooted.
EF1	SSE of Tahlequah	Cherokee, Adair	OK	35.78°N 94.92°W	1422	14.5 miles (23.3 km)		One mobile home was destroyed and homes sustained roof damage. A few outbuildings were destroyed, and trees and tree limbs were snapped.
EF0	W of Litchfield	Sherman	NE	41.17°N 99.19°W	1648	0.5 miles (0.80 km)		A metal building at a farmstead was damaged.
EF0	ESE of Ord	Valley	NE	41.58°N 98.83°W	1737	100 yards (91 m)		Brief tornado remained over open country, causing no damage.
EF0	NE of Ericson	Wheeler	NE	41.83°N 98.60°W	1805	0.25 miles (0.40 km)		A pole barn sustained major damage, and the roof of another outbuilding was destroyed.
EF0	NNE of Bartlett	Wheeler	NE	42.00°N 98.48°W	1855	0.15 miles (0.24 km)		Brief tornado remained over open country, causing no damage.
EF0	SSW of Verdigre	Knox	NE	42.58°N 98.04°W	1927	0.4 miles (0.64 km)		Brief tornado remained over open country, causing no damage.
EF0	WNW of Santee	Knox	NE	42.84°N 97.86°W	1935	0.4 miles (0.64 km)		Brief tornado near Lewis and Clark Lake caused no damage.
EF0	NE of Springfield	Bon Homme	SD	42.87°N 97.85°W	1940	0.5 miles (0.80 km)		Brief rope tornado remained over open country, causing no damage.
EF0	ENE of Minneota	Lyon	MN	44.59°N 95.89°W	2111	0.5 miles (0.80 km)		Brief tornado remained over open country, causing no damage.
EF1	SE of Morganton	Van Buren	AR	35.45°N 92.29°W	2311	2.3 miles (3.7 km)		This tornado snapped off or uprooted dozens of trees, tore part of the porch roof off a mobile home, overturned a travel trailer, and caused minor damage to a house and a vacant mobile home.
EF0	SW of Brownton	McLeod	MN	44.71°N 94.38°W	0024	150 yards (140 m)		Brief rope tornado remained over open country, causing no damage.

=== April 16 event ===
List of confirmed tornadoes – Monday, April 16, 2012
EF#	Location	County / Parish	State	Start Coord.	Time (UTC)	Path length	Max width	Summary
EF1	Portland	San Patricio	TX	27.87°N 97.31°W	1023	2 miles (3.2 km)		This tornado moved through Portland, causing considerable damage. 50 homes were impacted, 8 of which sustained significant damage. Many trees and fences were downed, and vehicles were damaged as well.
EF0	E of Gregory	San Patricio	TX	27.92°N 97.26°W	1050	1 mile (1.6 km)		A fireworks stand was flipped and an outbuilding was damaged.
EF0	NNW of Ingleside	San Patricio	TX	27.92°N 97.23°W	1120	0.5 miles (0.80 km)		This brief tornado damaged a few power poles.
EF0	NE of Riviera	Kleberg	TX	27.31°N 97.74°W	1335	0.5 miles (0.80 km)		Brief tornado remained over open country, causing no damage.
EF0	NNE of Sarita	Kenedy	TX	27.25°N 97.78°W	1337	0.8 miles (1.3 km)		Brief tornado remained over open country, causing no damage.
