= Sharon, Oklahoma =

- Town
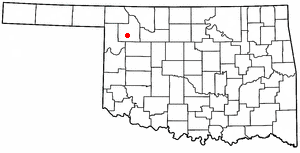
- Location of Sharon, Oklahoma
- Coordinates: 36°16′32″N 99°20′17″W
- Country: United States
- State: Oklahoma
- County: Woodward

Area
  - Total: 0.14 sq mi (0.35 km^{2})
  - Land: 0.14 sq mi (0.35 km^{2})
  - Water: 0 sq mi (0.00 km^{2})
- Elevation: 2,060 ft (630 m)

Population (2020)
  - Total: 133
  - Density: 976.1/sq mi (376.86/km^{2})
- Time zone: UTC-6 (Central (CST))
  - Summer (DST): UTC-5 (CDT)
- ZIP code: 73857
- Area code: 580
- FIPS code: 40-66650
- GNIS feature ID: 2413277

Sharon is a town in Woodward County, Oklahoma, United States. The population was 133 at the 2020 census.

== Geography ==
According to the United States Census Bureau, the town has a total area of 0.1 square miles (0.26 km^{2}), all land.

== Demographics ==
Historical population
Census	Pop.	Note	%±
1930	227		—
1940	226		−0.4%
1950	133		−41.2%
1960	97		−27.1%
1970	155		59.8%
1980	171		10.3%
1990	108		−36.8%
2000	122		13.0%
2010	135		10.7%
2020	133		−1.5%
U.S. Decennial Census

=== 2020 census ===
As of the 2020 census, Sharon had a population of 133. The median age was 32.3 years. 31.6% of residents were under the age of 18 and 14.3% of residents were 65 years of age or older. For every 100 females there were 107.8 males, and for every 100 females age 18 and over there were 106.8 males age 18 and over.

0.0% of residents lived in urban areas, while 100.0% lived in rural areas.

There were 47 households in Sharon, of which 36.2% had children under the age of 18 living in them. Of all households, 55.3% were married-couple households, 14.9% were households with a male householder and no spouse or partner present, and 17.0% were households with a female householder and no spouse or partner present. About 19.1% of all households were made up of individuals and 14.9% had someone living alone who was 65 years of age or older.

There were 62 housing units, of which 24.2% were vacant. The homeowner vacancy rate was 7.5% and the rental vacancy rate was 16.7%.

Racial composition as of the 2020 census
Race	Number	Percent
White	112	84.2%
Black or African American	0	0.0%
American Indian and Alaska Native	3	2.3%
Asian	0	0.0%
Native Hawaiian and Other Pacific Islander	0	0.0%
Some other race	2	1.5%
Two or more races	16	12.0%
Hispanic or Latino (of any race)	16	12.0%

=== 2000 census ===
As of the census of 2000, there were 122 people, 45 households, and 32 families residing in the town. The population density was 1,013.2 inhabitants per square mile (391.2/km^{2}). There were 52 housing units at an average density of 431.9 per square mile (166.8/km^{2}). The racial makeup of the town was 94.26% White, 4.10% Native American, and 1.64% from two or more races.

There were 45 households, out of which 33.3% had children under the age of 18 living with them, 66.7% were married couples living together, and 26.7% were non-families. 24.4% of all households were made up of individuals, and 13.3% had someone living alone who was 65 years of age or older. The average household size was 2.71 and the average family size was 3.18.

In the town, the population was spread out, with 31.1% under the age of 18, 2.5% from 18 to 24, 28.7% from 25 to 44, 15.6% from 45 to 64, and 22.1% who were 65 years of age or older. The median age was 36 years. For every 100 females, there were 82.1 males. For every 100 females age 18 and over, there were 100.0 males.

The median income for a household in the town was $45,000, and the median income for a family was $46,667. Males had a median income of $24,688 versus $28,333 for females. The per capita income for the town was $12,444. There were 10.0% of families and 18.4% of the population living below the poverty line, including 35.4% of under eighteens and none of those over 64.
