= Macksville, Kansas =

City in Stafford County, Kansas

- City
- Location within Stafford County and Kansas

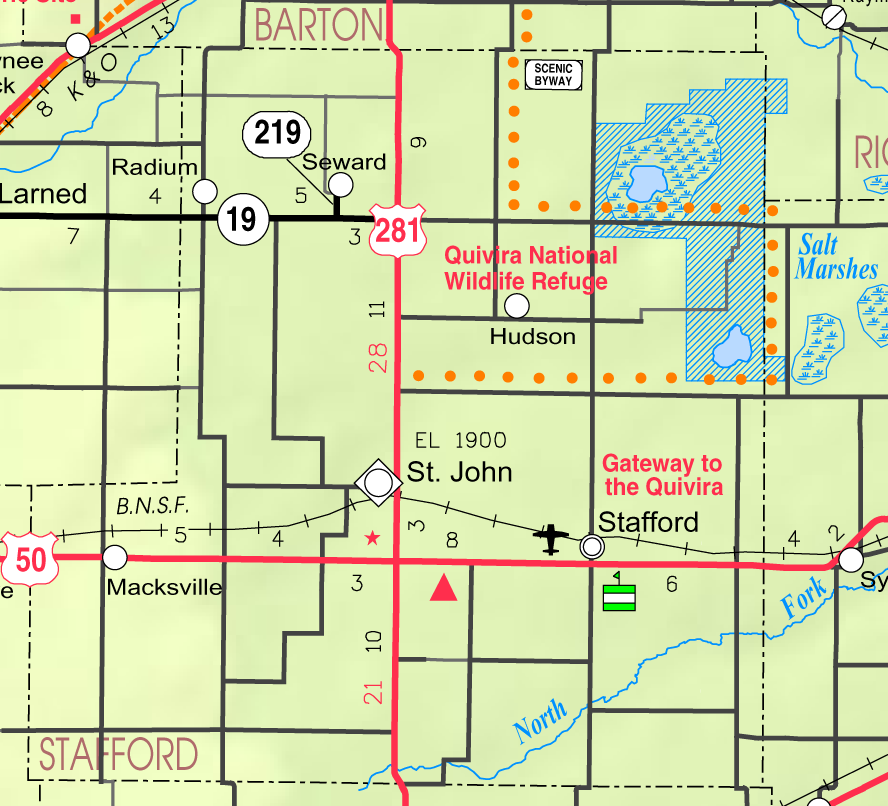
- KDOT map of Stafford County (legend)
- Coordinates: 37°57′26″N 98°58′08″W
- Country: United States
- State: Kansas
- County: Stafford
- Founded: 1885
- Incorporated: 1886
- Named for: George Mack

Area
  - Total: 1.00 sq mi (2.59 km^{2})
  - Land: 1.00 sq mi (2.59 km^{2})
  - Water: 0 sq mi (0.00 km^{2})
- Elevation: 2,028 ft (618 m)

Population (2020)
  - Total: 471
  - Density: 471/sq mi (182/km^{2})
- Time zone: UTC-6 (CST)
  - Summer (DST): UTC-5 (CDT)
- ZIP Code: 67557
- Area code: 620
- FIPS code: 20-43850
- GNIS ID: 2395800

Macksville is a city in Stafford County, Kansas, United States. As of the 2020 census, the population of the city was 471. It is located along Highway 50.

== History ==
Macksville was first settled in 1878 and the town was founded about 1885. The town formerly hosted a stop on the Atchison, Topeka, and Santa Fe Railway and a weekly newspaper (the Enterprise). It was named for George Mack, the first postmaster of Stafford County.

== Geography ==
According to the United States Census Bureau, the city has a total area of 1.00 square mile (2.59 km^{2}), all land.

=== Climate ===
The climate in this area is characterized by hot, humid summers and generally mild to cool winters although sometimes it can get very cold. According to the Köppen Climate Classification system, Macksville has a humid subtropical climate, abbreviated "Cfa" on climate maps.

== Demographics ==
Historical population
Census	Pop.	Note	%±
1890	156		—
1900	248		59.0%
1910	626		152.4%
1920	753		20.3%
1930	868		15.3%
1940	723		−16.7%
1950	624		−13.7%
1960	546		−12.5%
1970	484		−11.4%
1980	546		12.8%
1990	488		−10.6%
2000	514		5.3%
2010	549		6.8%
2020	471		−14.2%
U.S. Decennial Census

=== 2020 census ===
The 2020 United States census counted 471 people, 161 households, and 119 families in Macksville. The population density was 471.9 per square mile (182.2/km^{2}). There were 203 housing units at an average density of 203.4 per square mile (78.5/km^{2}). The racial makeup was 69.21% (326) white or European American (61.78% non-Hispanic white), 0.21% (1) black or African-American, 1.06% (5) Native American or Alaska Native, 0.21% (1) Asian, 0.21% (1) Pacific Islander or Native Hawaiian, 13.59% (64) from other races, and 15.5% (73) from two or more races. Hispanic or Latino of any race was 32.27% (152) of the population.

Of the 161 households, 34.8% had children under the age of 18; 60.9% were married couples living together; 24.2% had a female householder with no spouse or partner present. 23.0% of households consisted of individuals and 13.7% had someone living alone who was 65 years of age or older. The average household size was 2.6 and the average family size was 3.1. The percent of those with a bachelor's degree or higher was estimated to be 17.0% of the population.

32.7% of the population was under the age of 18, 6.8% from 18 to 24, 24.6% from 25 to 44, 25.7% from 45 to 64, and 10.2% who were 65 years of age or older. The median age was 34.1 years. For every 100 females, there were 100.4 males. For every 100 females ages 18 and older, there were 99.4 males.

The 2016–2020 5-year American Community Survey estimates show that the median household income was $48,125 (with a margin of error of +/- $9,768) and the median family income was $53,750 (+/- $7,794). Males had a median income of $33,571 (+/- $10,872) versus $16,063 (+/- $4,789) for females. The median income for those above 16 years old was $25,673 (+/- $6,554). Approximately, 0.0% of families and 5.7% of the population were below the poverty line, including 0.0% of those under the age of 18 and 3.4% of those ages 65 or over.

=== 2010 census ===
As of the census of 2010, there were 549 people, 197 households, and 144 families residing in the city. The population density was 549.0 inhabitants per square mile (212.0/km^{2}). There were 230 housing units at an average density of 230.0 per square mile (88.8/km^{2}). The racial makeup of the city was 80.3% White, 1.3% Native American, 0.4% Asian, 16.0% from other races, and 2.0% from two or more races. Hispanic or Latino of any race were 33.7% of the population.

There were 197 households, of which 43.7% had children under the age of 18 living with them, 56.3% were married couples living together, 11.2% had a female householder with no husband present, 5.6% had a male householder with no wife present, and 26.9% were non-families. 21.3% of all households were made up of individuals, and 12.2% had someone living alone who was 65 years of age or older. The average household size was 2.79 and the average family size was 3.33.

The median age in the city was 32 years. 33% of residents were under the age of 18; 7.6% were between the ages of 18 and 24; 24% were from 25 to 44; 21.9% were from 45 to 64; and 13.5% were 65 years of age or older. The gender makeup of the city was 47.9% male and 52.1% female.

== Education ==
The community and nearby rural areas are served by Macksville USD 351 public school district. The high school mascot is the Mustang. The grade school mascot is the Colt.
