= Tangier, Oklahoma =

- Unincorporated community
- Location within Oklahoma
- Coordinates: 36°25′15″N 99°32′00″W
- Country: United States
- State: Oklahoma
- County: Woodward
- Elevation: 2,192 ft (668 m)
- Time zone: UTC-6 (Central (CST))
  - Summer (DST): UTC-5 (CDT)
- Area code: 580
- GNIS feature ID: 1100875

Tangier is an unincorporated community in Woodward County, Oklahoma, United States. During the 1940s, there was a bentonite plant located two miles east of Tangier.
