= Hudson, Kansas =

City in Stafford County, Kansas

- City
- Location within Stafford County and Kansas

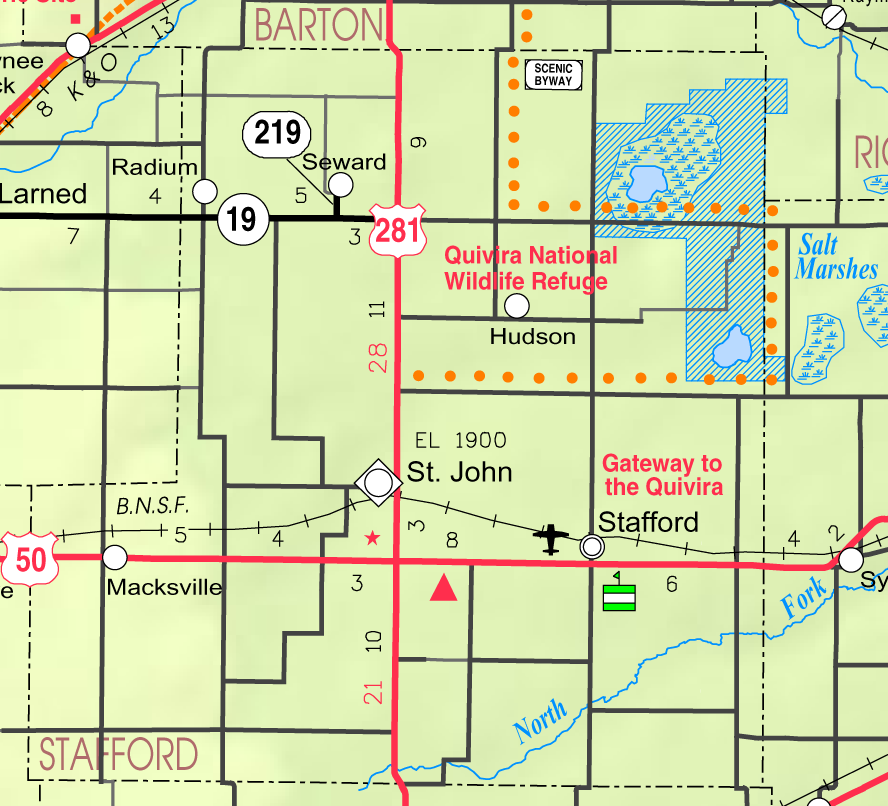
- KDOT map of Stafford County (legend)
- Coordinates: 38°06′18″N 98°39′38″W
- Country: United States
- State: Kansas
- County: Stafford
- Founded: 1880s
- Incorporated: 1905

Government
  - Type: Mayor–Council

Area
  - Total: 0.12 sq mi (0.32 km^{2})
  - Land: 0.12 sq mi (0.32 km^{2})
  - Water: 0 sq mi (0.00 km^{2})
- Elevation: 1,870 ft (570 m)

Population (2020)
  - Total: 95
  - Density: 770/sq mi (300/km^{2})
- Time zone: UTC-6 (CST)
  - Summer (DST): UTC-5 (CDT)
- ZIP Code: 67545
- Area code: 620
- FIPS code: 20-33400
- GNIS ID: 2394439

Hudson is a city in Stafford County, Kansas, United States. As of the 2020 census, the population of the city was 95.

== History ==
Hudson was originally called Rattlesnake, and under the latter name was founded in the early 1880s. It was renamed Hudson about 1887. Hudson was incorporated as a city in 1908.

== Geography ==
According to the United States Census Bureau, the city has a total area of 0.13 square miles (0.34 km^{2}), all land.

=== Climate ===
Climate data for Hudson, Kansas (1991–2020)
Month	Jan	Feb	Mar	Apr	May	Jun	Jul	Aug	Sep	Oct	Nov	Dec	Year
Mean daily maximum °F (°C)	44.3 (6.8)	48.5 (9.2)	59.3 (15.2)	68.8 (20.4)	78.3 (25.7)	88.8 (31.6)	93.5 (34.2)	91.3 (32.9)	83.7 (28.7)	71.2 (21.8)	56.9 (13.8)	45.4 (7.4)	69.2 (20.6)
Daily mean °F (°C)	32.4 (0.2)	35.9 (2.2)	45.8 (7.7)	55.3 (12.9)	65.5 (18.6)	76.0 (24.4)	80.6 (27.0)	78.6 (25.9)	70.6 (21.4)	57.8 (14.3)	44.4 (6.9)	34.2 (1.2)	56.4 (13.6)
Mean daily minimum °F (°C)	20.5 (−6.4)	23.3 (−4.8)	32.4 (0.2)	41.8 (5.4)	52.7 (11.5)	63.2 (17.3)	67.8 (19.9)	65.9 (18.8)	57.6 (14.2)	44.3 (6.8)	31.8 (−0.1)	23.0 (−5.0)	43.7 (6.5)
Average precipitation inches (mm)	0.82 (21)	1.05 (27)	1.96 (50)	2.49 (63)	4.64 (118)	3.98 (101)	4.00 (102)	3.35 (85)	1.94 (49)	2.25 (57)	1.21 (31)	1.05 (27)	28.74 (731)
Average snowfall inches (cm)	5.1 (13)	3.5 (8.9)	3.0 (7.6)	0.5 (1.3)	0.0 (0.0)	0.0 (0.0)	0.0 (0.0)	0.0 (0.0)	0.0 (0.0)	0.2 (0.51)	1.6 (4.1)	4.2 (11)	18.1 (46.41)
Source: NOAA

== Demographics ==
Historical population
Census	Pop.	Note	%±
1910	253		—
1920	235		−7.1%
1930	197		−16.2%
1940	221		12.2%
1950	194		−12.2%
1960	201		3.6%
1970	181		−10.0%
1980	157		−13.3%
1990	159		1.3%
2000	133		−16.4%
2010	129		−3.0%
2020	95		−26.4%
U.S. Decennial Census

=== 2020 census ===
The 2020 United States census counted 95 people, 49 households, and 28 families in Hudson. The population density was 760.0 per square mile (293.4/km^{2}). There were 58 housing units at an average density of 464.0 per square mile (179.2/km^{2}). The racial makeup was 96.84% (92) white or European American (96.84% non-Hispanic white), 0.0% (0) black or African-American, 1.05% (1) Native American or Alaska Native, 0.0% (0) Asian, 0.0% (0) Pacific Islander or Native Hawaiian, 0.0% (0) from other races, and 2.11% (2) from two or more races. Hispanic or Latino of any race was 0.0% (0) of the population.

Of the 49 households, 14.3% had children under the age of 18; 42.9% were married couples living together; 18.4% had a female householder with no spouse or partner present. 40.8% of households consisted of individuals and 18.4% had someone living alone who was 65 years of age or older. The average household size was 2.0 and the average family size was 2.3. The percent of those with a bachelor's degree or higher was estimated to be 20.0% of the population.

12.6% of the population was under the age of 18, 7.4% from 18 to 24, 23.2% from 25 to 44, 33.7% from 45 to 64, and 23.2% who were 65 years of age or older. The median age was 56.2 years. For every 100 females, there were 93.9 males. For every 100 females ages 18 and older, there were 102.4 males.

The 2016–2020 5-year American Community Survey estimates show that the median household income was $47,500 (with a margin of error of +/- $19,190) and the median family income was $61,250 (+/- $18,303). Males had a median income of $42,813 (+/- $7,650) versus $21,023 (+/- $2,207) for females. The median income for those above 16 years old was $34,167 (+/- $15,749). Approximately, 3.1% of families and 13.3% of the population were below the poverty line, including 10.0% of those under the age of 18 and 0.0% of those ages 65 or over.

=== 2010 census ===
As of the census of 2010, there were 129 people, 58 households, and 35 families residing in the city. The population density was 992.3 inhabitants per square mile (383.1/km^{2}). There were 66 housing units at an average density of 507.7 per square mile (196.0/km^{2}). The racial makeup of the city was 100.0% White. Hispanic or Latino of any race were 4.7% of the population.

There were 58 households, of which 22.4% had children under the age of 18 living with them, 48.3% were married couples living together, 3.4% had a female householder with no husband present, 8.6% had a male householder with no wife present, and 39.7% were non-families. 37.9% of all households were made up of individuals, and 13.8% had someone living alone who was 65 years of age or older. The average household size was 2.22 and the average family size was 2.80.

The median age in the city was 48.5 years. 23.3% of residents were under the age of 18; 2.3% were between the ages of 18 and 24; 14% were from 25 to 44; 39.6% were from 45 to 64; and 20.9% were 65 years of age or older. The gender makeup of the city was 52.7% male and 47.3% female.

== Economy ==
Stafford County Flour Mills is the primary employer of the community. In addition to making their own brand of Hudson Cream Flour, they also produce some varieties of flour for Kemach, King Arthur, Kroger brands too. Their Hudson Cream Flour is very popular in West Virginia and nearby Appalachia regions, for example, it is a required biscuit ingredient for the Hudson Cream West Virginia Biscuit Bake Off contest in Marlinton, West Virginia.

== Education ==
The community is served by St. John–Hudson USD 350 public school district.

== See also ==
- Quivira National Wildlife Refuge
