= Burdett, Kansas =

City in Pawnee County, Kansas

- City
- Location within Pawnee County and Kansas

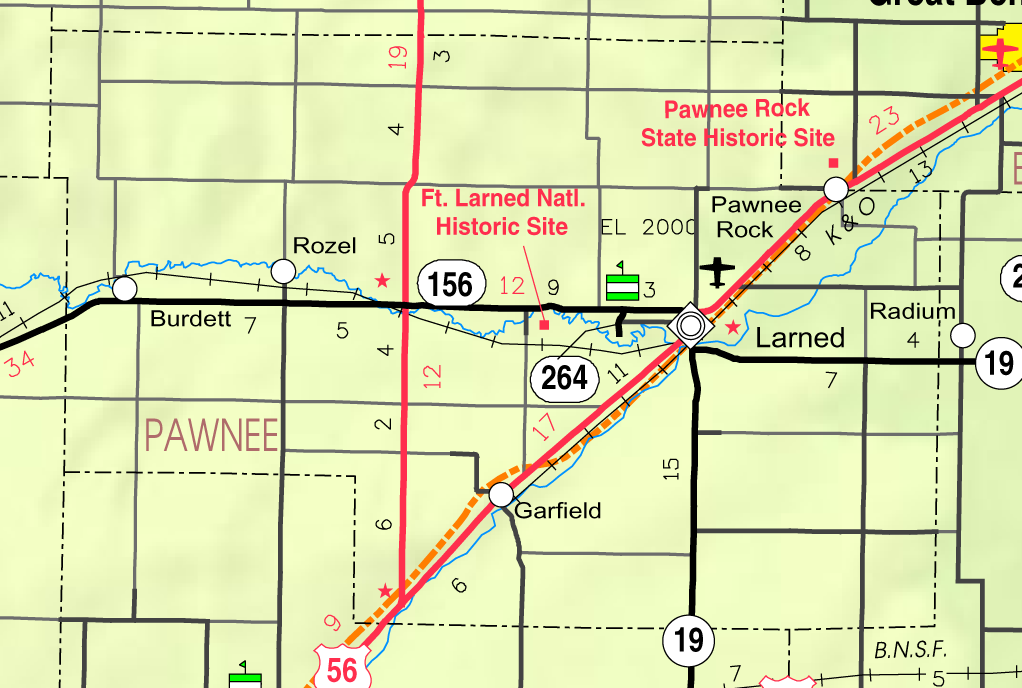
- KDOT map of Pawnee County (legend)
- Coordinates: 38°11′37″N 99°31′35″W
- Country: United States
- State: Kansas
- County: Pawnee
- Founded: 1880s
- Incorporated: 1961
- Named for: Robert Burdette

Area
  - Total: 0.26 sq mi (0.67 km^{2})
  - Land: 0.26 sq mi (0.67 km^{2})
  - Water: 0 sq mi (0.00 km^{2})
- Elevation: 2,120 ft (650 m)

Population (2020)
  - Total: 228
  - Density: 880/sq mi (340/km^{2})
- Time zone: UTC-6 (CST)
  - Summer (DST): UTC-5 (CDT)
- ZIP Code: 67523
- Area code: 620
- FIPS code: 20-09275
- GNIS ID: 2393467
- Website: burdettks.org

Burdett is a city in Pawnee County, Kansas, United States. As of the 2020 census, the population of the city was 228.

== History ==
Burdett was a station and shipping point on the division of the Atchison, Topeka and Santa Fe Railway that ran from Larned to Jetmore. The community was named for the American humorist writer Robert Jones Burdette.

A post office was opened in Brown's Grove (an extinct town) in 1877, but it was moved to Burdett in 1887.

== Geography ==
According to the United States Census Bureau, the city has a total area of 0.27 square miles (0.70 km^{2}), all land.

=== Climate ===
The climate in this area is characterized by hot, humid summers and generally mild to cool winters. According to the Köppen Climate Classification system, Burdett has a humid subtropical climate, abbreviated "Cfa" on climate maps.

== Demographics ==
Historical population
Census	Pop.	Note	%±
1970	285		—
1980	275		−3.5%
1990	248		−9.8%
2000	256		3.2%
2010	247		−3.5%
2020	228		−7.7%
U.S. Decennial Census

=== 2020 census ===
The 2020 United States census counted 228 people, 95 households, and 65 families in Burdett. The population density was 876.9 per square mile (338.6/km^{2}). There were 122 housing units at an average density of 469.2 per square mile (181.2/km^{2}). The racial makeup was 94.74% (216) white or European American (92.11% non-Hispanic white), 0.44% (1) black or African-American, 0.44% (1) Native American or Alaska Native, 0.0% (0) Asian, 0.0% (0) Pacific Islander or Native Hawaiian, 0.44% (1) from other races, and 3.95% (9) from two or more races. Hispanic or Latino of any race was 4.39% (10) of the population.

Of the 95 households, 28.4% had children under the age of 18; 52.6% were married couples living together; 27.4% had a female householder with no spouse or partner present. 26.3% of households consisted of individuals and 10.5% had someone living alone who was 65 years of age or older. The average household size was 3.1 and the average family size was 3.7. The percent of those with a bachelor's degree or higher was estimated to be 25.4% of the population.

26.3% of the population was under the age of 18, 5.3% from 18 to 24, 21.9% from 25 to 44, 24.6% from 45 to 64, and 21.9% who were 65 years of age or older. The median age was 41.2 years. For every 100 females, there were 98.3 males. For every 100 females ages 18 and older, there were 102.4 males.

The 2016–2020 5-year American Community Survey estimates show that the median household income was $39,250 (with a margin of error of +/- $24,316) and the median family income was $49,375 (+/- $23,576). Males had a median income of $35,481 (+/- $5,852) versus $33,750 (+/- $20,303) for females. The median income for those above 16 years old was $35,060 (+/- $8,564). Approximately, 5.1% of families and 6.6% of the population were below the poverty line, including 8.5% of those under the age of 18 and 0.0% of those ages 65 or over.

=== 2010 census ===
As of the census of 2010, there were 247 people, 102 households, and 68 families residing in the city. The population density was 914.8 inhabitants per square mile (353.2/km^{2}). There were 128 housing units at an average density of 474.1 per square mile (183.1/km^{2}). The racial makeup of the city was 99.2% White, 0.4% African American, and 0.4% Native American. Hispanic or Latino of any race were 0.8% of the population.

There were 102 households, of which 33.3% had children under the age of 18 living with them, 56.9% were married couples living together, 6.9% had a female householder with no husband present, 2.9% had a male householder with no wife present, and 33.3% were non-families. 33.3% of all households were made up of individuals, and 16.7% had someone living alone who was 65 years of age or older. The average household size was 2.42 and the average family size was 3.06.

The median age in the city was 41.3 years. 29.1% of residents were under the age of 18; 6.6% were between the ages of 18 and 24; 18.7% were from 25 to 44; 24.4% were from 45 to 64; and 21.5% were 65 years of age or older. The gender makeup of the city was 49.8% male and 50.2% female.

== Education ==
Burdett is served by Pawnee Heights USD 496. The Pawnee Heights High School mascot is Tigers.

Burdett High School was closed through school unification. The Burdett Tigers won the Kansas State High School boys class BB basketball championship in 1954.

== Notable people ==
- Clyde Tombaugh, the astronomer who discovered the dwarf planet Pluto in 1930, lived in Burdett during part of his teens.
