= Cooperton, Oklahoma =

- Town
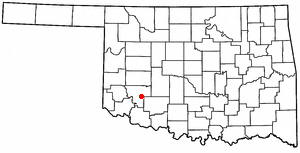
- Location of Cooperton, Oklahoma
- Coordinates: 34°51′59″N 98°52′15″W
- Country: United States
- State: Oklahoma
- County: Kiowa

Area
  - Total: 0.52 sq mi (1.34 km^{2})
  - Land: 0.52 sq mi (1.34 km^{2})
  - Water: 0 sq mi (0.00 km^{2})
- Elevation: 1,539 ft (469 m)

Population (2020)
  - Total: 3
  - Density: 5.8/sq mi (2.24/km^{2})
- Time zone: UTC-6 (Central (CST))
  - Summer (DST): UTC-5 (CDT)
- FIPS code: 40-17050
- GNIS feature ID: 2413239
- Website: www.ghosttowns.com/states/ok/cooperton.html

Cooperton is a town in Kiowa County, Oklahoma, United States. The population was 3 at the 2020 census, down from 16 in the 2010 census. Making it the second least populated municipality in the U.S State of Oklahoma.

== History ==
This community, originally called Cooper, was planned in 1899 by Frank Cooper, who had organized a settlement company in anticipation of the opening of the Kiowa, Comanche and Apache Reservation in August 1901. Learning that the land would be granted by lottery instead of a run, Cooper requested and was granted 320 acres for members of his company. The name had to be changed to Cooperton, because there was already another community named Cooper in the territory.

Cooperton had one hundred residents by 1910, and reached its peak population of 187 by 1940. Thereafter, the population declined, reaching 20 by the start of the 21st century.

== Geography ==
Cooperton is located 14 miles (23 km) south of Gotebo and 9 miles (14 km) east of Roosevelt.

According to the United States Census Bureau, the town has a total area of 0.5 square miles (1.3 km^{2}), all land.

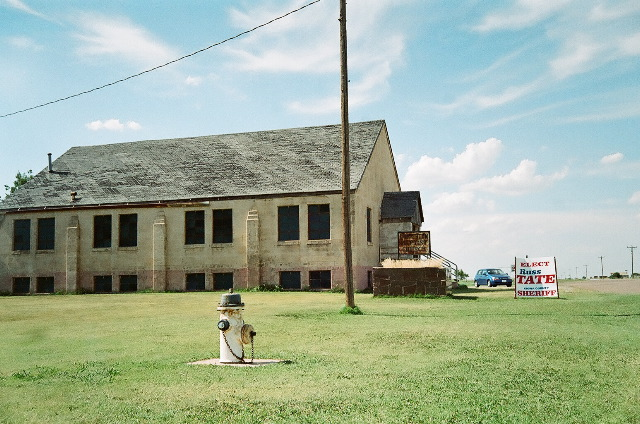
The Cooperton Baptist church is one of the most substantial buildings remaining in this small town.

== Demographics ==
Historical population
Census	Pop.	Note	%±
1910	100		—
1920	105		5.0%
1930	151		43.8%
1940	187		23.8%
1950	129		−31.0%
1960	106		−17.8%
1970	55		−48.1%
1980	31		−43.6%
1990	15		−51.6%
2000	20		33.3%
2010	16		−20.0%
2020	3		−81.2%
U.S. Decennial Census

=== 2020 census ===
As of the 2020 census, Cooperton had a population of 3. The median age was 51.5 years. 0.0% of residents were under the age of 18 and 33.3% of residents were 65 years of age or older.

0.0% of residents lived in urban areas, while 100.0% lived in rural areas.

There were 6 households in Cooperton, of which 83.3% had children under the age of 18 living in them. Of all households, 16.7% were married-couple households, 50.0% were households with a male householder and no spouse or partner present, and 33.3% were households with a female householder and no spouse or partner present. About 16.7% of all households were made up of individuals and 0.0% had someone living alone who was 65 years of age or older.

There were 8 housing units, of which 25.0% were vacant. The homeowner vacancy rate was 0.0% and the rental vacancy rate was 0.0%.

Racial composition as of the 2020 census
Race	Number	Percent
White	2	66.7%
Black or African American	0	0.0%
American Indian and Alaska Native	0	0.0%
Asian	0	0.0%
Native Hawaiian and Other Pacific Islander	0	0.0%
Some other race	0	0.0%
Two or more races	1	33.3%
Hispanic or Latino (of any race)	1	33.3%

=== 2000 census ===
As of the census of 2000, there were 20 people, 12 households, and 6 families residing in the town. The population density was 40.8 inhabitants per square mile (15.8/km^{2}). There were 19 housing units at an average density of 38.8 per square mile (15.0/km^{2}). The racial makeup of the town was 85.00% White and 15.00% African American.

There were 12 households, out of which 16.7% had children under the age of 18 living with them, 41.7% were married couples living together, and 50.0% were non-families. 50.0% of all households were made up of individuals, and 33.3% had someone living alone who was 65 years of age or older. The average household size was 1.67 and the average family size was 2.33.

In the town, the population was spread out, with 15.0% under the age of 18, 20.0% from 25 to 44, 20.0% from 45 to 64, and 45.0% who were 65 years of age or older. The median age was 64 years. For every 100 females, there were 300.0 males. For every 100 females age 18 and over, there were 240.0 males.

The median income for a household in the town was $13,125, and the median income for a family was $14,375. Males had a median income of $11,875 versus $0 for females. The per capita income for the town was $12,096. There are 28.6% of families living below the poverty line and 35.7% of the population, including 60.0% of under eighteens and 22.2% of those over 64.
