= Hardy, Nebraska =

Village in Nuckolls County, Nebraska, United States

- Village
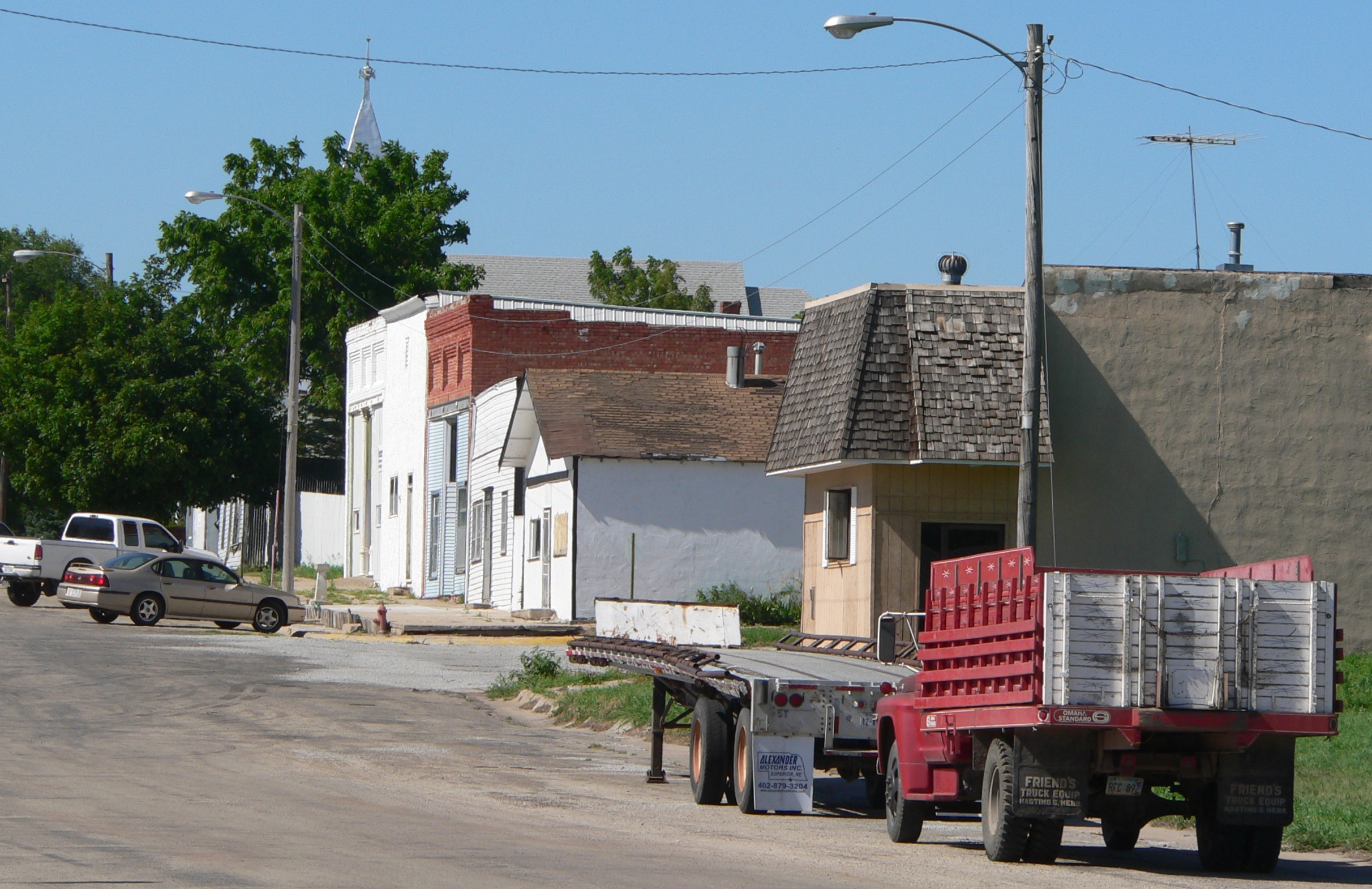
- Downtown Hardy, June 2010

- Location of Hardy, Nebraska
- Coordinates: 40°00′41″N 97°55′26″W
- Country: United States
- State: Nebraska
- County: Nuckolls

Area
  - Total: 0.61 sq mi (1.57 km^{2})
  - Land: 0.61 sq mi (1.57 km^{2})
  - Water: 0 sq mi (0.00 km^{2})
- Elevation: 1,572 ft (479 m)

Population (2020)
  - Total: 97
  - Density: 160/sq mi (61.7/km^{2})
- Time zone: UTC-6 (Central (CST))
  - Summer (DST): UTC-5 (CDT)
- ZIP code: 68943
- Area code: 402
- FIPS code: 31-20995
- GNIS feature ID: 2398248

Hardy is a village in Nuckolls County, Nebraska, United States. As of the 2020 census, Hardy had a population of 97.

== History ==
Hardy was platted in 1880 when the railroad was extended to that point. It was named for a railroad official.

== Geography ==
According to the United States Census Bureau, the village has a total area of 0.61 square miles (1.58 km^{2}), all land.

== Demographics ==
Historical population
Census	Pop.	Note	%±
1890	343		—
1900	345		0.6%
1910	496		43.8%
1920	445		−10.3%
1930	399		−10.3%
1940	341		−14.5%
1950	348		2.1%
1960	285		−18.1%
1970	250		−12.3%
1980	232		−7.2%
1990	206		−11.2%
2000	179		−13.1%
2010	159		−11.2%
2020	97		−39.0%
U.S. Decennial Census; 2012 Estimate

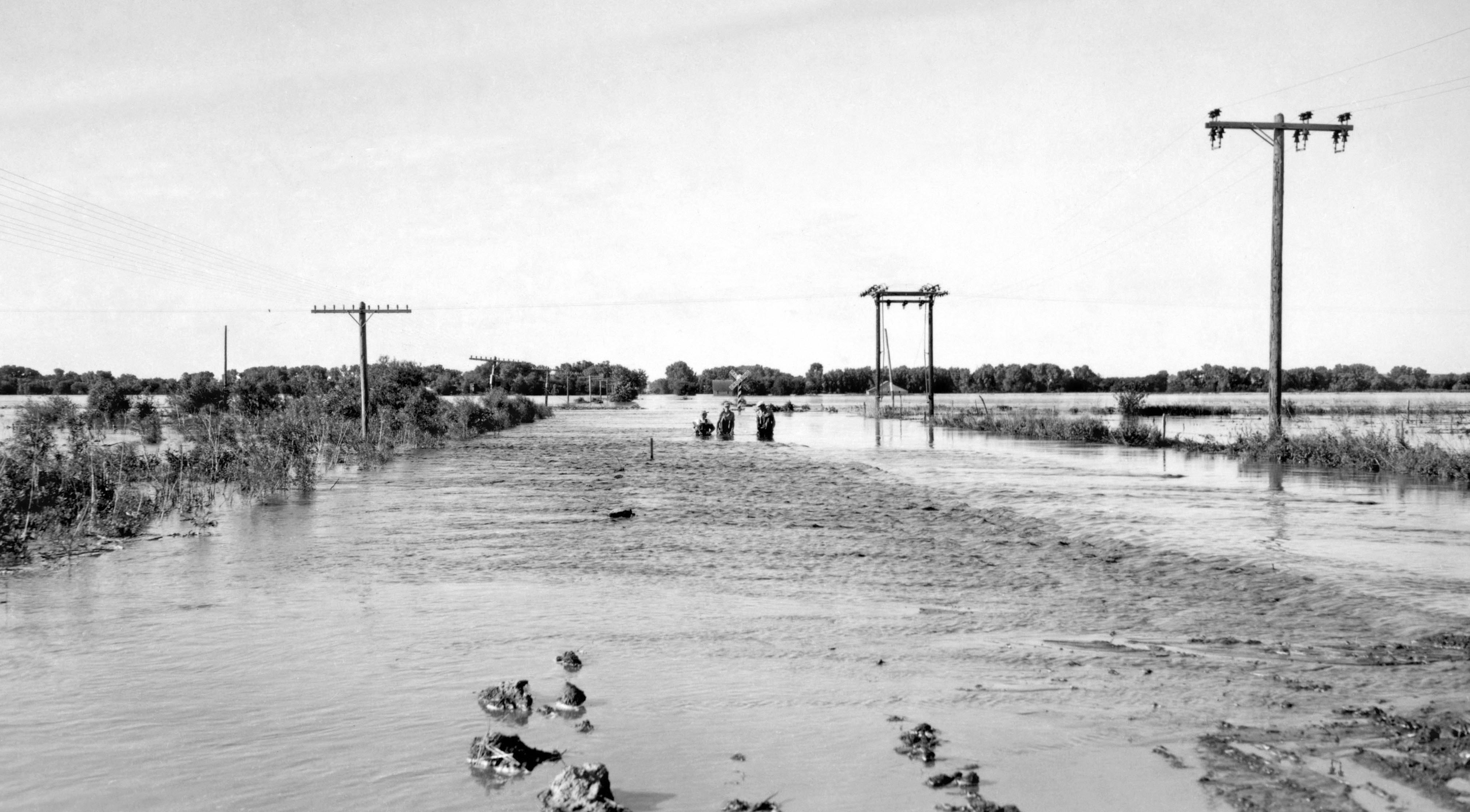
June 24, 1947 flood of the Republican River on the border of Jewell County, Kansas and Republic County, Kansas near Hardy, Nebraska and Webber, Kansas, just south of Nebraska NE-8 on Kansas 1 Rd/CR-1 bridge over the Republican River. The normal flood stage for the river is at the tree line in the foreground.

=== 2010 census ===
As of the census of 2010, there were 159 people, 69 households, and 44 families living in the village. The population density was 260.7 inhabitants per square mile (100.7/km^{2}). There were 78 housing units at an average density of 127.9 per square mile (49.4/km^{2}). The racial makeup of the village was 100.0% White. Hispanic or Latino of any race were 0.6% of the population.

There were 69 households, of which 24.6% had children under the age of 18 living with them, 47.8% were married couples living together, 7.2% had a female householder with no husband present, 8.7% had a male householder with no wife present, and 36.2% were non-families. 33.3% of all households were made up of individuals, and 8.6% had someone living alone who was 65 years of age or older. The average household size was 2.30 and the average family size was 2.86.

The median age in the village was 43.1 years. 25.2% of residents were under the age of 18; 7.5% were between the ages of 18 and 24; 21.4% were from 25 to 44; 29.4% were from 45 to 64; and 16.4% were 65 years of age or older. The gender makeup of the village was 52.2% male and 47.8% female.

=== 2000 census ===
As of the census of 2000, there were 179 people, 68 households, and 46 families living in the village. The population density was 293.6 inhabitants per square mile (113.4/km^{2}). There were 89 housing units at an average density of 146.0 per square mile (56.4/km^{2}). The racial makeup of the village was 100.00% White.

There were 68 households, out of which 32.4% had children under the age of 18 living with them, 55.9% were married couples living together, 5.9% had a female householder with no husband present, and 30.9% were non-families. 26.5% of all households were made up of individuals, and 16.2% had someone living alone who was 65 years of age or older. The average household size was 2.63 and the average family size was 3.17.

In the village, the population was spread out, with 32.4% under the age of 18, 8.4% from 18 to 24, 19.6% from 25 to 44, 26.3% from 45 to 64, and 13.4% who were 65 years of age or older. The median age was 36 years. For every 100 females, there were 126.6 males. For every 100 females age 18 and over, there were 112.3 males.

As of 2000 the median income for a household in the village was $28,750, and the median income for a family was $31,250. Males had a median income of $16,250 versus $15,500 for females. The per capita income for the village was $13,539. About 17.0% of families and 18.4% of the population were below the poverty line, including 26.8% of those under the age of eighteen and 17.2% of those 65 or over.

== See also ==
- List of municipalities in Nebraska
