= Dickens, Nebraska =

Unincorporated community in Nebraska, United States

- Unincorporated community
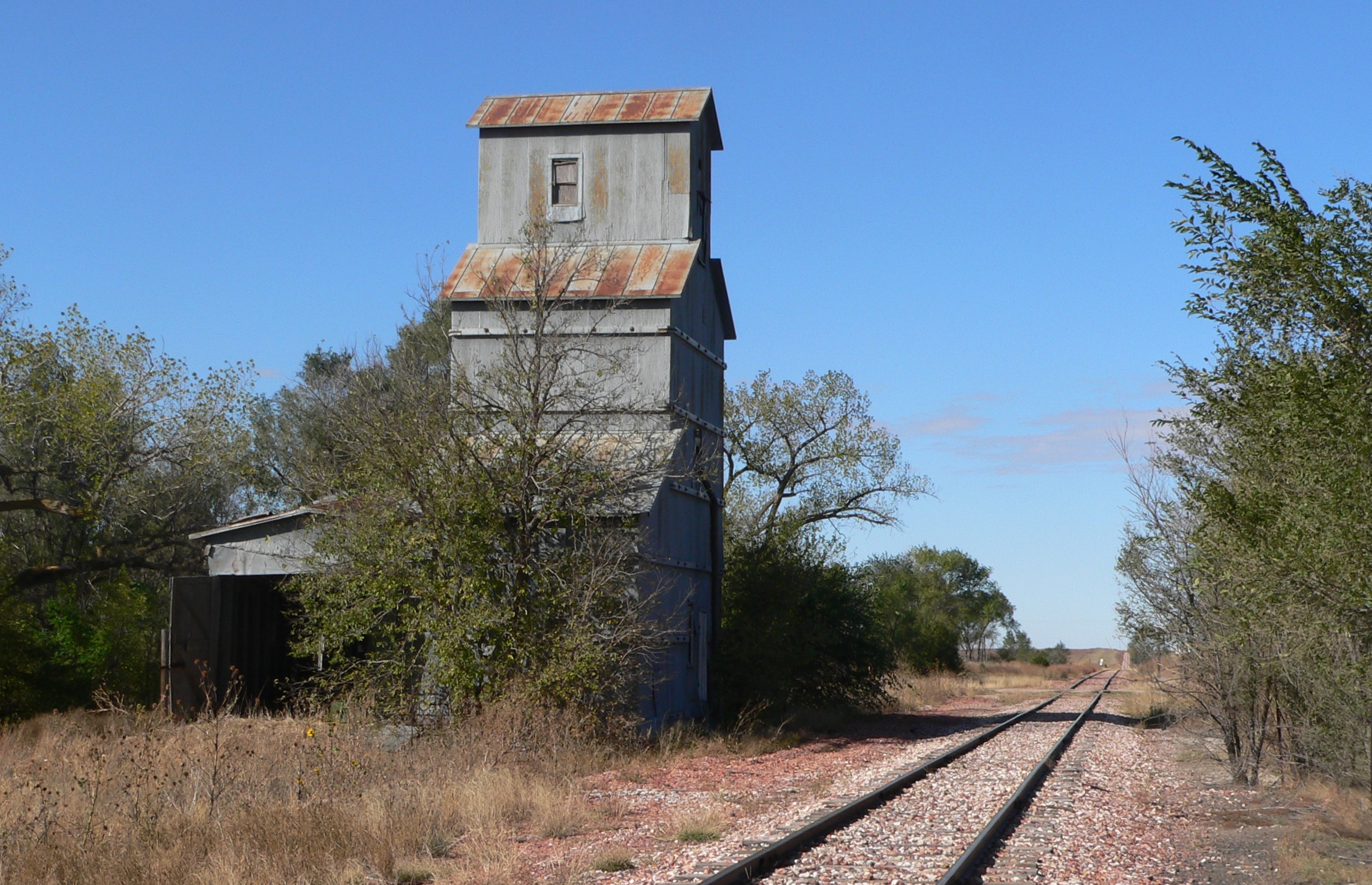
- Abandoned grain elevator in Dickens

- Location in Nebraska Location in the United States
- Coordinates: 40°49′34″N 100°59′35″W
- Country: United States
- State: Nebraska
- County: Lincoln
- Elevation: 3,136 ft (956 m)
- Time zone: UTC-6 (Central (CST))
  - Summer (DST): UTC-5 (CDT)
- ZIP codes: 69132
- GNIS feature ID: 835287

Dickens is an unincorporated community in southwestern Lincoln County, Nebraska, United States. It lies along Nebraska Highway 23 southwest of the city of North Platte, the county seat of Lincoln County. Its elevation is 3,136 feet (956 m). The community is named for Charles Dickens. Although Dickens is unincorporated, it has a post office, with the ZIP code of 69132.

== History ==
Dickens got its start in the 1880s, following construction of the Chicago, Burlington and Quincy Railroad through the territory.
