= Timken, Kansas =

City in Rush County, Kansas

- City
- Location within Rush County and Kansas

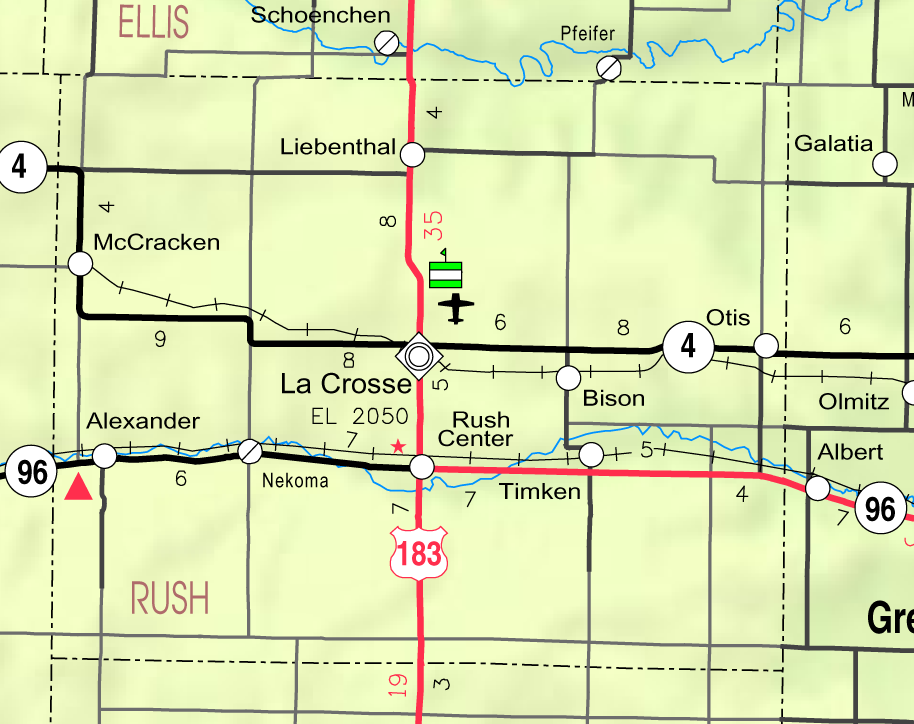
- KDOT map of Rush County (legend)
- Coordinates: 38°28′23″N 99°10′41″W
- Country: United States
- State: Kansas
- County: Rush
- Founded: 1880s
- Incorporated: 1930
- Named for: Henry Timken

Area
  - Total: 0.13 sq mi (0.33 km^{2})
  - Land: 0.13 sq mi (0.33 km^{2})
  - Water: 0 sq mi (0.00 km^{2})
- Elevation: 1,959 ft (597 m)

Population (2020)
  - Total: 38
  - Density: 300/sq mi (120/km^{2})
- Time zone: UTC-6 (CST)
  - Summer (DST): UTC-5 (CDT)
- ZIP Code: 67575
- Area code: 785
- FIPS code: 20-70625
- GNIS ID: 2397024

Timken is a city in Rush County, Kansas, United States. As of the 2020 census, the population of the city was 38.

== History ==
Timken was named after a land speculator, Henry Timken, who purchased land in which he believed that the Atchison, Topeka & Santa Fe Railroad would be building. When Henry Timken sold the land to the railroad, one of the conditions was that the town was named after him. During the year to follow a lumber mill, railroad depot, grocery store, and even a bowling alley would be established in the town. The town was settled mainly by immigrants from Czechoslovakia, Bohemia and Moravia.

A post office was opened in Timken in 1888, and remained in operation until it was discontinued in 1996.

The railroad continued to provide freight and passenger service until the depot was abandoned in the mid-1970s. Soon after, the depot was moved to nearby La Crosse and became one of the buildings that now make up the Rush County Historical Museum.

== Geography ==
According to the United States Census Bureau, the city has a total area of 0.15 square miles (0.39 km^{2}), all land.

== Demographics ==
Historical population
Census	Pop.	Note	%±
1940	170		—
1950	138		−18.8%
1960	147		6.5%
1970	123		−16.3%
1980	99		−19.5%
1990	87		−12.1%
2000	83		−4.6%
2010	76		−8.4%
2020	38		−50.0%
U.S. Decennial Census

=== 2010 census ===
As of the census of 2010, there were 76 people, 29 households, and 17 families residing in the city. The population density was 506.7 inhabitants per square mile (195.6/km^{2}). There were 45 housing units at an average density of 300.0 per square mile (115.8/km^{2}). The racial makeup of the city was 92.1% White, 1.3% Asian, 1.3% from other races, and 5.3% from two or more races. Hispanic or Latino of any race were 6.6% of the population.

There were 29 households, of which 34.5% had children under the age of 18 living with them, 48.3% were married couples living together, 3.4% had a female householder with no husband present, 6.9% had a male householder with no wife present, and 41.4% were non-families. 34.5% of all households were made up of individuals, and 13.7% had someone living alone who was 65 years of age or older. The average household size was 2.62 and the average family size was 3.35.

The median age in the city was 39 years. 35.5% of residents were under the age of 18; 2.6% were between the ages of 18 and 24; 24.9% were from 25 to 44; 17% were from 45 to 64; and 19.7% were 65 years of age or older. The gender makeup of the city was 50.0% male and 50.0% female.

=== 2000 census ===
As of the census of 2000, there were 83 people, 40 households, and 25 families residing in the city. The population density was 570.5 inhabitants per square mile (220.3/km^{2}). There were 51 housing units at an average density of 350.5 per square mile (135.3/km^{2}). The racial makeup of the city was 97.59% White, 1.20% Native American, and 1.20% from two or more races.

There were 40 households, out of which 22.5% had children under the age of 18 living with them, 50.0% were married couples living together, 10.0% had a female householder with no husband present, and 37.5% were non-families. 32.5% of all households were made up of individuals, and 12.5% had someone living alone who was 65 years of age or older. The average household size was 2.08 and the average family size was 2.60.

In the city, the population was spread out, with 19.3% under the age of 18, 12.0% from 18 to 24, 22.9% from 25 to 44, 22.9% from 45 to 64, and 22.9% who were 65 years of age or older. The median age was 42 years. For every 100 females, there were 80.4 males. For every 100 females age 18 and over, there were 91.4 males.

The median income for a household in the city was $25,500, and the median income for a family was $25,000. Males had a median income of $20,625 versus $14,500 for females. The per capita income for the city was $28,897. There were no families and 10.4% of the population living below the poverty line, including no under eighteens and none of those over 64.

== Education ==
The community is served by Otis–Bison USD 403 public school district.
