= Wellfleet, Nebraska =

- Village
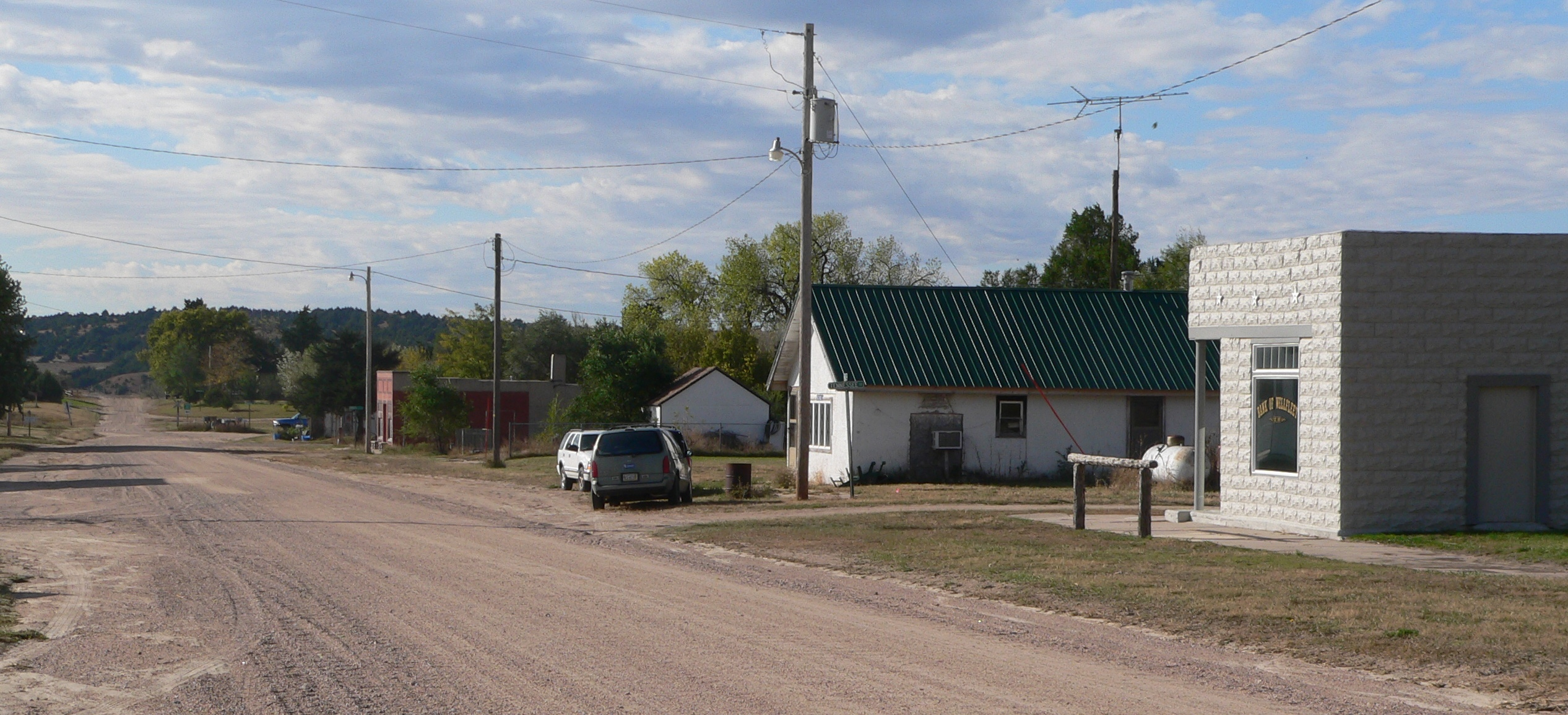
- Downtown Wellfleet

- Location of Wellfleet, Nebraska
- Coordinates: 40°45′14″N 100°43′55″W
- Country: United States
- State: Nebraska
- County: Lincoln

Area
  - Total: 0.27 sq mi (0.70 km^{2})
  - Land: 0.27 sq mi (0.70 km^{2})
  - Water: 0 sq mi (0.00 km^{2})
- Elevation: 2,835 ft (864 m)

Population (2020)
  - Total: 72
  - Density: 265.8/sq mi (102.63/km^{2})
- Time zone: UTC-6 (Central (CST))
  - Summer (DST): UTC-5 (CDT)
- ZIP code: 69170
- Area code: 308
- FIPS code: 31-52085
- GNIS feature ID: 2400121

Wellfleet is a village in Lincoln County, Nebraska, United States. It is part of the North Platte, Nebraska Micropolitan Statistical Area. As of the 2020 census, Wellfleet had a population of 72.

== History ==
Wellfleet was platted circa 1887 when the railroad was extended to that point. It was named after the town of Wellfleet, Massachusetts.

== Geography ==
According to the United States Census Bureau, the village has a total area of 0.27 square miles (0.70 km^{2}), all land.

== Demographics ==
Historical population
Census	Pop.	Note	%±
1930	178		—
1940	111		−37.6%
1950	93		−16.2%
1960	67		−28.0%
1970	51		−23.9%
1980	83		62.7%
1990	63		−24.1%
2000	76		20.6%
2010	78		2.6%
2020	72		−7.7%
U.S. Decennial Census

=== 2010 census ===
As of the census of 2010, there were 78 people, 30 households, and 24 families residing in the village. The population density was 288.9 inhabitants per square mile (111.5/km^{2}). There were 38 housing units at an average density of 140.7 per square mile (54.3/km^{2}). The racial makeup of the village was 76.9% White, 1.3% African American, 5.1% Asian, 7.7% from other races, and 9.0% from two or more races. Hispanic or Latino of any race were 10.3% of the population.

There were 30 households, of which 30.0% had children under the age of 18 living with them, 63.3% were married couples living together, 10.0% had a female householder with no husband present, 6.7% had a male householder with no wife present, and 20.0% were non-families. 20.0% of all households were made up of individuals, and 10% had someone living alone who was 65 years of age or older. The average household size was 2.60 and the average family size was 2.88.

The median age in the village was 50.5 years. 25.6% of residents were under the age of 18; 3.8% were between the ages of 18 and 24; 11.6% were from 25 to 44; 47.4% were from 45 to 64; and 11.5% were 65 years of age or older. The gender makeup of the village was 48.7% male and 51.3% female.

=== 2000 census ===
As of the census of 2000, there were 76 people, 27 households, and 18 families residing in the village. The population density was 272.6 inhabitants per square mile (105.3/km^{2}). There were 32 housing units at an average density of 114.8 per square mile (44.3/km^{2}). The racial makeup of the village was 92.11% White, and 7.89% from two or more races. Hispanic or Latino of any race were 6.58% of the population.

There were 27 households, out of which 40.7% had children under the age of 18 living with them, 63.0% were married couples living together, 3.7% had a female householder with no husband present, and 33.3% were non-families. 18.5% of all households were made up of individuals, and 11.1% had someone living alone who was 65 years of age or older. The average household size was 2.81 and the average family size was 3.44.

In the village, the population was spread out, with 30.3% under the age of 18, 11.8% from 18 to 24, 18.4% from 25 to 44, 30.3% from 45 to 64, and 9.2% who were 65 years of age or older. The median age was 38 years. For every 100 females, there were 111.1 males. For every 100 females age 18 and over, there were 96.3 males.

As of 2000 the median income for a household in the village was $32,500, and the median income for a family was $48,750. Males had a median income of $29,167 versus $12,500 for females. The per capita income for the village was $13,011. There were 15.4% of families and 15.4% of the population living below the poverty line, including no under eighteens and 77.8% of those over 64.
