= National Register of Historic Places listings in Blaine County, Oklahoma =

Location of Blaine County in Oklahoma

This is a list of the National Register of Historic Places listings in Blaine County, Oklahoma.

This is intended to be a complete list of the properties on the National Register of Historic Places in Blaine County, Oklahoma, United States. The locations of National Register properties for which the latitude and longitude coordinates are included below, may be seen in a map.

There are 18 properties listed on the National Register in the county.

This National Park Service list is complete through NPS recent listings posted March 20, 2026.

== Current listings ==
	Name on the Register	Image	Date listed	Location	City or town	Description
1	Acre Family Barn		March 13, 2013 (#13000073)	Route 2, Box 37; 36°02′21″N 98°36′09″W	Canton vicinity	
2	Blaine County Courthouse	Blaine County Courthouse	August 23, 1984 (#84002972)	212 N. Weigle St. 35°50′46″N 98°24′38″W	Watonga	
3	Cantonment		April 28, 1970 (#70000527)	North of Canton; 36°06′00″N 98°37′02″W	Canton	
4	Jesse Chisholm Grave Site	Jesse Chisholm Grave Site	December 16, 1971 (#71000658)	Northeast of Geary near the North Canadian River; 35°43′36″N 98°17′28″W	Geary	The inscription on the headstone reads Jesse Chisholm Born 1805 DIED MAR 4 1868 NO ONE LEFT HIS HOME COLD OR HUNGRY
5	Cronkhite Ranch House		September 22, 1983 (#83002073)	North of Watonga off State Highway 51A; 35°56′11″N 98°27′11″W	Watonga	
6	Dusbabek Filling Station		August 28, 2024 (#100010776)	101 N Main Street; 36°06′59″N 98°19′01″W	Okeene	
7	Thompson Benton Ferguson House	Thompson Benton Ferguson House	May 17, 1973 (#73001555)	521 N. Weigle Ave (listed as N. Weigel St.); 35°50′58″N 98°24′44″W	Watonga	The home was built in 1902 by the then 6th territorial Governor of Oklahoma and local newspaper editor and publisher Thompson Benton Ferguson.
8	Gillespie Building	Gillespie Building	November 13, 1989 (#89001963)	102 E. Main St. 35°37′51″N 98°19′01″W	Geary	The Gillespie Building (also known as the American State Bank Building)is located on the southeast corner of the intersection of Main and Broadway.It is a two-story brick building constructed in 1902-1903
9	Noble Hotel	Noble Hotel	May 10, 1996 (#96000491)	112 N. Noble St. 35°50′41″N 98°24′45″W	Watonga	The Noble Hotel is a two-story, red brick building built In 1912 the architectural style of the building is Prairie Commercial
10	Okeene Flour Mill		November 7, 1976 (#76001555)	Off State Highway 51; 36°07′02″N 98°19′12″W	Okeene	
11	Old Plant Office Building, U.S. Gypsum Co.		May 13, 1983 (#83002074)	State Highway 51A; 36°03′21″N 98°28′29″W	Southard	
12	Old Salt Works		July 28, 1983 (#83002075)	Southeast of Southard; 36°01′03″N 98°27′11″W	Southard	
13	Public Water Trough	Public Water Trough	November 15, 1989 (#89001965)	Junction of Main, Canadian, and Northeast Boulevard; 35°37′52″N 98°18′54″W	Geary	The Public Water Trough is a concrete structure built in the late teens or early 1920s. The u-shaped indentation was intended to accommodate a wagon tongue, thus allowing a team to be watered without first being unharnessed from the wagon.
14	Shinn Family Barn		March 10, 1983 (#83002076)	Southeast of Okeene; 36°05′08″N 98°14′35″W	Okeene	Relocated to the Harn Homestead Museum in Oklahoma City in 1987.
15	Sooner Co-op Association Elevator (West)		August 31, 2000 (#00001040)	302 W. F St. 36°07′04″N 98°19′13″W	Okeene	
16	United States Post Office Watonga	United States Post Office Watonga	April 17, 2009 (#09000213)	121 N. Noble Ave. 35°50′41″N 98°24′47″W	Watonga	The United States Post Office in Watonga Oklahoma was built in 1936 as a product of the New Deal public works program. It is a brick-clad building designed in the Colonial Revival style with one and one-half stories and a basement..
17	J.H. Wagner House	J.H. Wagner House	March 10, 1983 (#83002077)	521 N. Prouty Ave. 35°50′59″N 98°24′51″W	Watonga	Built in 1903, the J.H. Wagner House is a three-story frame building with clapboard siding painted white. The house is Victorian Queen Anne in architectural style, it features a unique two-story, eight-sided tower with a modified cupola at its northeast corner.
18	Watonga Armory	Watonga Armory	May 20, 1994 (#94000491)	301 W. Main; 35°50′39″N 98°24′56″W	Watonga	Built between 1935 and 1937 The Watonga Armory is a Large two-story building constructed of red brick with cast concrete Art Deco detailing, it was a product of the Works Progress Administration.

== See also ==
- List of National Historic Landmarks in Oklahoma
- National Register of Historic Places listings in Oklahoma
