= Hitchcock, Oklahoma =

Town in Oklahoma, US

- Town
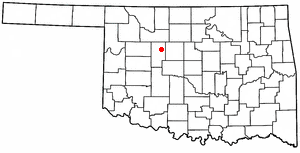
- Location of Hitchcock, Oklahoma
- Coordinates: 35°58′04″N 98°20′59″W
- Country: United States
- State: Oklahoma
- County: Blaine

Area
  - Total: 0.15 sq mi (0.39 km^{2})
  - Land: 0.15 sq mi (0.39 km^{2})
  - Water: 0 sq mi (0.00 km^{2})
- Elevation: 1,289 ft (393 m)

Population (2020)
  - Total: 102
  - Density: 680.9/sq mi (262.91/km^{2})
- Time zone: UTC-6 (Central (CST))
  - Summer (DST): UTC-5 (CDT)
- ZIP code: 73744
- Area code: 580
- FIPS code: 40-34850
- GNIS feature ID: 2412757

Hitchcock is a town in Blaine County, Oklahoma, United States. As of the 2020 census, Hitchcock had a population of 102.

== Geography ==
Hitchcock is located along Oklahoma State Highway 8. It is 11 miles (18 km) northeast of Watonga, the county seat, and 11 miles (18 km) south of Okeene.

According to the United States Census Bureau, the town of Hitchcock has a total area of 0.2 square miles (0.52 km^{2}), all land.

== Demographics ==
Historical population
Census	Pop.	Note	%±
1910	275		—
1920	281		2.2%
1930	246		−12.5%
1940	222		−9.8%
1950	166		−25.2%
1960	134		−19.3%
1970	160		19.4%
1980	172		7.5%
1990	139		−19.2%
2000	141		1.4%
2010	121		−14.2%
2020	102		−15.7%
U.S. Decennial Census

=== 2020 census ===
As of the 2020 census, Hitchcock had a population of 102. The median age was 35.0 years. 30.4% of residents were under the age of 18 and 20.6% of residents were 65 years of age or older. For every 100 females there were 104.0 males, and for every 100 females age 18 and over there were 82.1 males age 18 and over.

0.0% of residents lived in urban areas, while 100.0% lived in rural areas.

There were 34 households in Hitchcock, of which 41.2% had children under the age of 18 living in them. Of all households, 50.0% were married-couple households, 17.6% were households with a male householder and no spouse or partner present, and 20.6% were households with a female householder and no spouse or partner present. About 14.7% of all households were made up of individuals and 8.8% had someone living alone who was 65 years of age or older.

There were 51 housing units, of which 33.3% were vacant. The homeowner vacancy rate was 3.4% and the rental vacancy rate was 12.5%.

Racial composition as of the 2020 census
Race	Number	Percent
White	88	86.3%
Black or African American	0	0.0%
American Indian and Alaska Native	4	3.9%
Asian	0	0.0%
Native Hawaiian and Other Pacific Islander	0	0.0%
Some other race	7	6.9%
Two or more races	3	2.9%
Hispanic or Latino (of any race)	14	13.7%

=== 2000 census ===
As of the 2000 census, there were 141 people, 51 households, and 39 families residing in the town. The population density was 929.8 inhabitants per square mile (359.0/km^{2}). There were 63 housing units at an average density of 415.4 per square mile (160.4/km^{2}). The racial makeup of the town was 90.78% White, 6.38% Native American, 0.71% from other races, and 2.13% from two or more races. Hispanic or Latino of any race were 0.71% of the population.

There were 51 households, out of which 41.2% had children under the age of 18 living with them, 58.8% were married couples living together, 7.8% had a female householder with no husband present, and 23.5% were non-families. 23.5% of all households were made up of individuals, and 9.8% had someone living alone who was 65 years of age or older. The average household size was 2.76 and the average family size was 3.26.

In the town, the population was spread out, with 33.3% under the age of 18, 7.8% from 18 to 24, 23.4% from 25 to 44, 22.0% from 45 to 64, and 13.5% who were 65 years of age or older. The median age was 36 years. For every 100 females, there were 107.4 males. For every 100 females age 18 and over, there were 91.8 males.

The median income for a household in the town was $28,750, and the median income for a family was $36,250. Males had a median income of $26,875 versus $19,750 for females. The per capita income for the town was $10,015. There were 25.7% of families and 31.3% of the population living below the poverty line, including 35.5% of under eighteens and 7.7% of those over 64.
