= Jesse Chisholm Grave Site =

- U.S. National Register of Historic Places
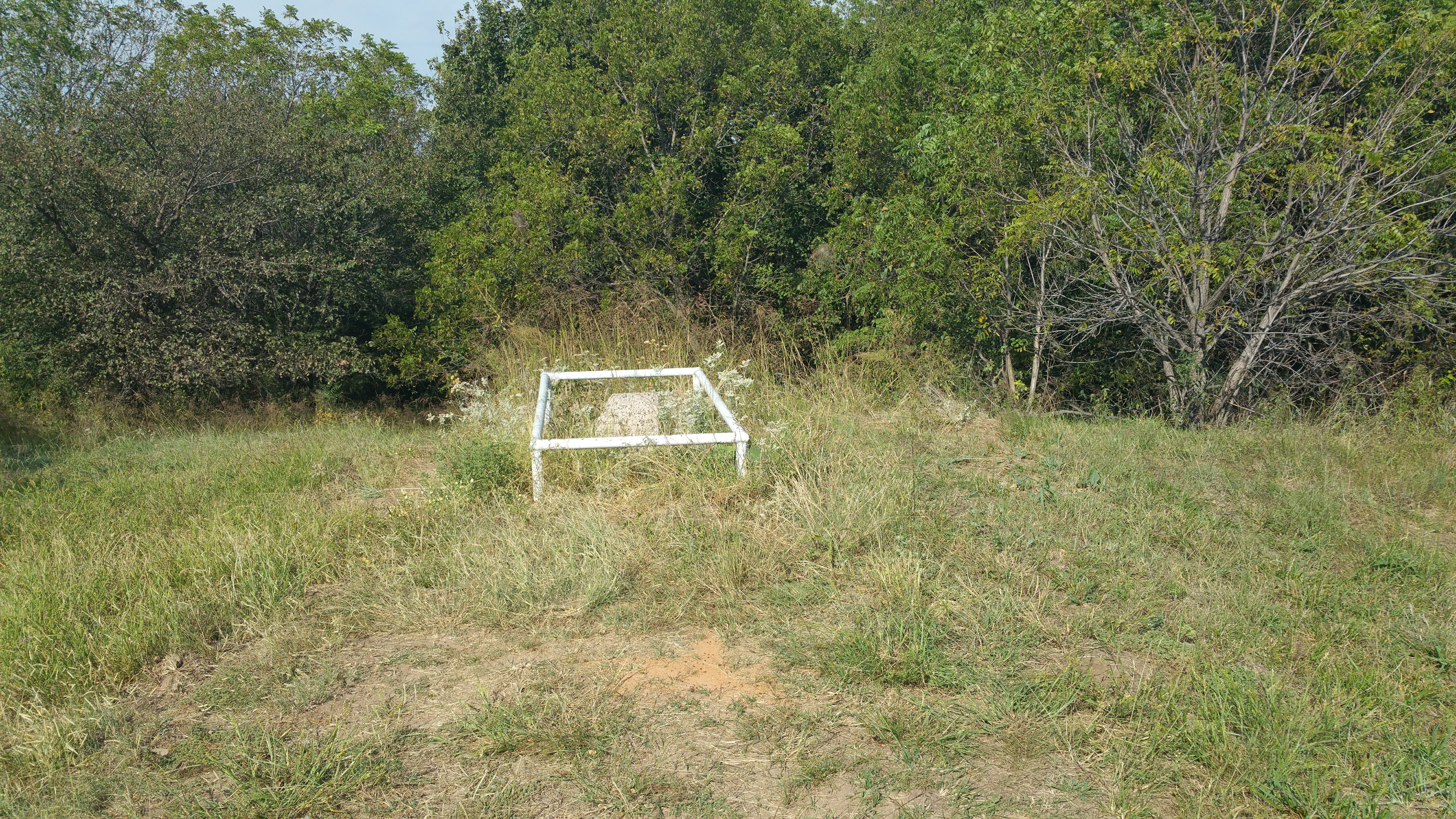

- Location within Oklahoma Location within the United States
- Nearest city: Geary, Oklahoma
- Coordinates: 35°43′36″N 98°17′28″W
- Area: 5 acres (2.0 ha)
- Built: 1868
- NRHP reference No.: 71000658
- Added to NRHP: December 16, 1971

The Jesse Chisholm Grave Site is a commemorative site in rural Blaine County, Oklahoma. Located about 6 miles (9.7 km) north of Geary on the east side of the North Canadian River, the site is the accepted location of the burial of Jesse Chisholm (c. 1805-1868), a well-known mixed-blood Cherokee trader for whom the Chisholm Trail is named. The site is also believed to include the burial site of Chief Left Hand, whose camp Chisholm was visiting at the time of his death. A nearby spring is named Left Hand Spring in the chief's honor. The site is a historical reminder of the friendship between the two men, who had an enduring friendship despite significant hostility between whites and Native Americans at the time.

The site of Chisholm's burial is marked by a simple granite marker bearing the words "Jesse Chisholm // Born 1805 // DIED MAR 4 1868 // NO ONE LEFT HIS HOME COLD OR HUNGRY". The site was listed on the National Register of Historic Places in 1971. It is maintained by the Oklahoma Historical Society.

== See also ==
- National Register of Historic Places listings in Blaine County, Oklahoma
