= Greenfield, Oklahoma =

Town in Oklahoma, US

- Town
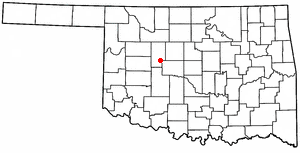
- Location of Greenfield, Oklahoma
- Coordinates: 35°43′45″N 98°22′39″W
- Country: United States
- State: Oklahoma
- County: Blaine

Area
  - Total: 0.14 sq mi (0.37 km^{2})
  - Land: 0.14 sq mi (0.37 km^{2})
  - Water: 0 sq mi (0.00 km^{2})
- Elevation: 1,457 ft (444 m)

Population (2020)
  - Total: 114
  - Density: 803/sq mi (309.9/km^{2})
- Time zone: UTC-6 (Central (CST))
  - Summer (DST): UTC-5 (CDT)
- ZIP code: 73043
- Area code: 580
- FIPS code: 40-31250
- GNIS feature ID: 2412709

Greenfield is a town in Blaine County, Oklahoma, United States. As of the 2020 census, Greenfield had a population of 114.

== History ==
The 80 original acres of Greenfield began as the homestead in 1899 of one George Evans. Somewhere in the 1900-1902 timeframe, the Choctaw Northern Railroad built through the area, its line running from Geary, Oklahoma to its termination at Anthony, Kansas. The railroad bought the farm from then-owners T.G. Curtner and J.M. Gray, proceeding to plat the town and sell lots. By 1913, the town had about 300 inhabitants, a newspaper (The Greenfield Hustler), a bank, a lumberyard, two livery barns, two grain elevators, a grist mill, a hotel, an opera house, and various merchants and contractors.

Greenfield still has freight rail service through the AT&L Railroad.

== Geography ==
Greenfield is located in southern Blaine County along U.S. Routes 270 and 281, halfway between Watonga, the county seat, and Geary.

According to the United States Census Bureau, the town has a total area of 0.1 square miles (0.26 km^{2}), all land.

== Demographics ==
Historical population
| Census | Pop. | Note | %± |
|---|---|---|---|
| 1940 | 303 | | — |
| 1950 | 191 | | −37.0% |
| 1960 | 128 | | −33.0% |
| 1970 | 143 | | 11.7% |
| 1980 | 233 | | 62.9% |
| 1990 | 200 | | −14.2% |
| 2000 | 123 | | −38.5% |
| 2010 | 93 | | −24.4% |
| 2020 | 114 | | 22.6% |
U.S. Decennial Census

=== 2020 census ===
As of the 2020 census, Greenfield had a population of 114. The median age was 38.0 years. 31.6% of residents were under the age of 18 and 21.9% of residents were 65 years of age or older. For every 100 females there were 103.6 males, and for every 100 females age 18 and over there were 90.2 males age 18 and over.

0.0% of residents lived in urban areas, while 100.0% lived in rural areas.

There were 36 households in Greenfield, of which 27.8% had children under the age of 18 living in them. Of all households, 50.0% were married-couple households, 30.6% were households with a male householder and no spouse or partner present, and 13.9% were households with a female householder and no spouse or partner present. About 16.7% of all households were made up of individuals and 5.6% had someone living alone who was 65 years of age or older.

There were 48 housing units, of which 25.0% were vacant. The homeowner vacancy rate was 0.0% and the rental vacancy rate was 0.0%.

Racial composition as of the 2020 census
| Race | Number | Percent |
|---|---|---|
| White | 86 | 75.4% |
| Black or African American | 0 | 0.0% |
| American Indian and Alaska Native | 3 | 2.6% |
| Asian | 0 | 0.0% |
| Native Hawaiian and Other Pacific Islander | 0 | 0.0% |
| Some other race | 2 | 1.8% |
| Two or more races | 23 | 20.2% |
| Hispanic or Latino (of any race) | 4 | 3.5% |
