= Jesse Chisholm =

Scotch-Cherokee American fur trader and merchant (1805-1868)

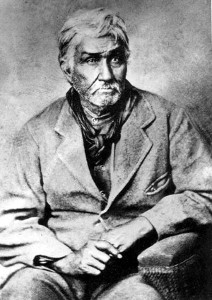
Jesse Chisholm

Jesse Chisholm (c. 1805 – March 4, 1868) was a Cherokee fur trader and merchant in the American West. Chisholm is known for having scouted and developed what became known as the Chisholm Trail, later used to drive cattle from Texas to railheads in Kansas in the second half of the 19th century.

Chisholm used this trail to supply his trading posts among the Native American tribes in Indian Territory (present-day Oklahoma). He worked with Black Beaver, a Lenape guide, to develop the route. Chisholm died before the peak period of the cattle drives, but he was essential to numerous events in Texas and Oklahoma history. Chisholm served as an interpreter for the Republic of Texas and the United States government in treaty-making with Native American tribes.

== Early life and education ==
Chisholm's father, Ignatius Chisholm, was of Scottish descent and worked as a merchant and slave trader. Ignatius was born in Tennessee circa 1777 and died in 1837 in Maine. Ignatius's lineage is disputed by historians; his maternal line is convoluted. Chisholm's mother, Martha "Patsy" (Rodgers), was a Cherokee from the region of Great Hiwassee (present-day Polk County) in eastern Tennessee. She was the daughter of Cherokee leader Charles Rodgers. Martha was born around 1788 and died in 1865 in Muskogee County, Oklahoma. The two married around 1800, had four kids, and separated sometime thereafter.

Jesse was born circa 1805 in the Hiawassee region of Tennessee. As the Cherokee had matrilineal kinship, Jesse was considered to belong to his mother's people. He was taken to Arkansas by his mother with the Tahlonteskee's group in 1810. The family and tribe settled along the Spadra River, as part of the voluntary relocation of Cherokee people. During his youth, Jesse hunted and explored the western frontier, developing strong survival and navigation skills. The Osage, a resident tribe of Arkansas, resented the intruders, and they would routinely attack and kill Cherokee Families. In retaliation, Chisholm's grandfather, father, and other Cherokee warriors brutally destroyed Clermont's Osage village (near present-day Claremore, Oklahoma) in the fall of 1817. In the years that followed, the family held a high level of political influence among both the U.S. Army and the Western Cherokees, later called the Old Settlers.

In September 1826, Chisholm became a scout for U.S. Army officers through what is now central Oklahoma and southern Kansas on a gold-hunting expedition. These visits introduced Chisholm to the languages and customs of the Comanches and Kiowas. He also gained extensive knowledge of the geography along the southwestern part of the Great Plains.

After his scouting trips, Jesse and his father joined their relative, Chief Oolootka (John Jolly), at Three Forks Village, near Cantonment Gibson in Indian Territory (near present-day Muskogee, Oklahoma) May 1829, Sam Houston arrived at Three Forks and was welcomed as a Cherokee brother by Chief Jolly. It was here that he met Jesse Chisholm. After a few months, Houston married Ignatius Chisholm’s young, widowed aunt, Diana (or Tiana) Rogers Gentry. Huston spent the following two years pursuing several financial schemes. He and Diana opened a store, the Wigwam Neosho, which became a success and may have influenced Jesse to become a trader. Houston went to Texas in 1833, leaving his Cherokee wife behind. She and the Chisholm family took over the trading post.

The same summer, Jesse Chisholm bought two wagons and went to Colonel Auguste Pierre Chouteau's trading post, located south of present day Norman, Oklahoma. He spent the rest of the year trading with various tribes along the Canadian River and at Council Grove, located west of present day Oklahoma City. A year later, went to James Edwards's store which was located near present day Holdenville, Oklahoma. Edwards's wife was a Creek woman which allowed him to operate on Indian land. Edwards and Chisholm became friends, due to Chisholm's linguistic skills and knowledge of the geography of the Plains. Edwards offered Chisholm a business partnership. In 1836 Chisholm married Edwards's daughter, Elizabeth.

== Career ==
In 1826, Chisholm became involved in working for a gold-seeking party, who investigated and explored the region from Arkansas to present-day Wichita, Kansas. Around 1830, Chisholm helped again on similar gold-seeking expedition from Fort Gibson to Fort Towson. In 1834, Chisholm was a member of the Dodge-Leavenworth Expedition, who first contacted the southern Plains Indians on behalf of the United States federal government.

In 1836, Chisholm married Eliza Edwards. They resided in the area of her father's trading post on the Little River near its confluence with the Canadian River in Indian Territory, where Chisholm briefly worked.

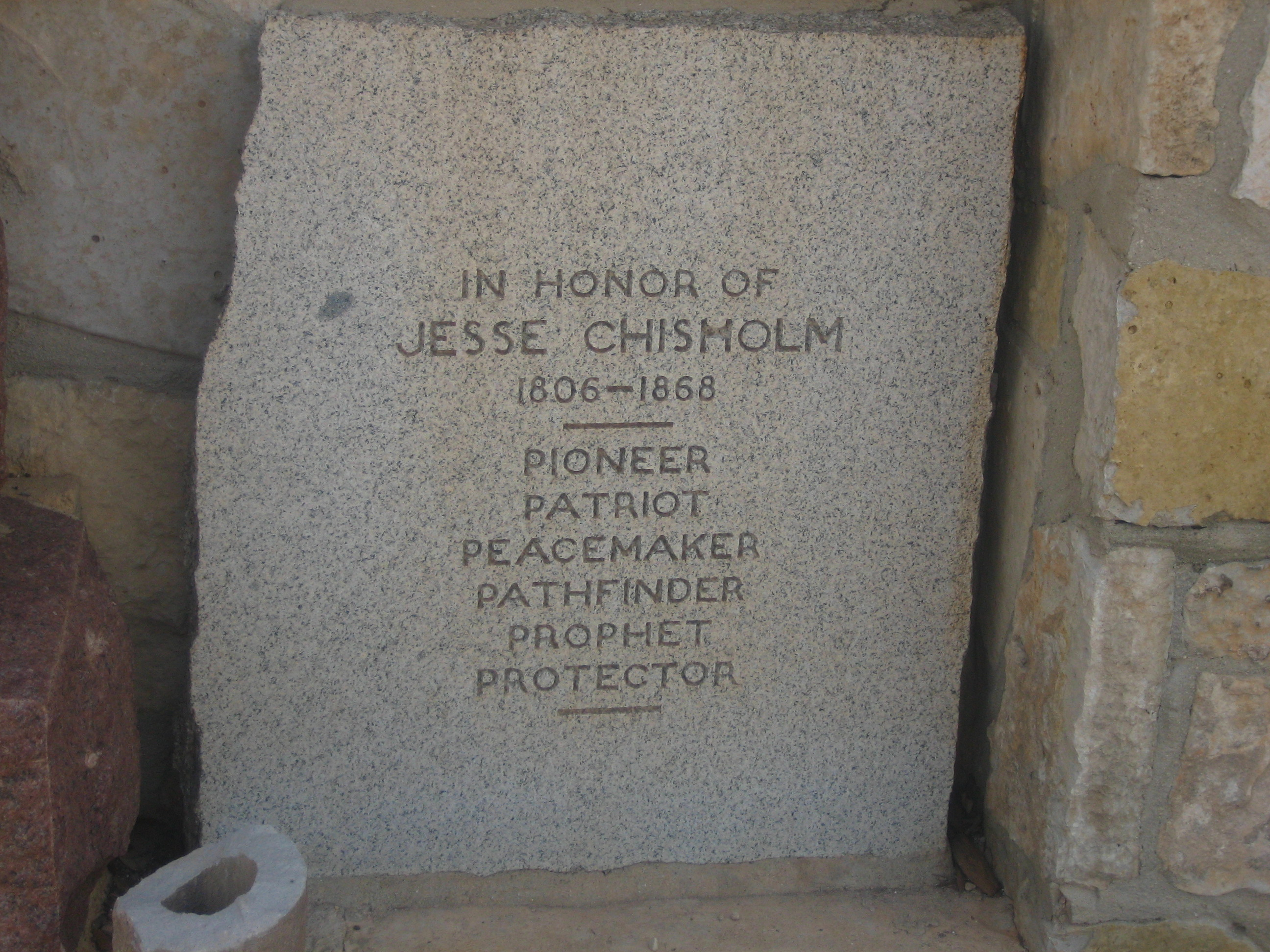
Monument to Jesse Chisholm in Bandera, Texas

Chisholm worked primarily as a trader across states and territories, either visiting tribes with wares from white trading posts or taking pelts and other Native goods back to places such as Leavenworth, Kansas or Fort Smith, Arkansas. Chisholm could reportedly speak thirteen Native American languages, as well as sign talk and Spanish, and was often used as an interpreter for treaties between Native tribes and white government officials. Sam Houston requested Chisholm personally on a few occasions to interpret and grant general aid when negotiating peace treaties between the Republic of Texas and local Indian tribes.

This diplomatic work spanned 20 years between 1838 and 1858. The early years included a lot of back and forth travel and tracking of Chiefs and other important Native leaders, including Sequoyah. In later years, Chisholm was well regarded both by white and Native peoples and was present on a trip to Washington, D.C., to interpret for a group of various tribal Chiefs and then president James K. Polk. Throughout this period, Chisholm also continued in the Indian trade, trading manufactured goods for peltry and cattle.

Chisholm's loyalties became divided during the American Civil War. Many residents of the Indian Territory feared they might be massacred, either intentionally or as an accident of war, if either side attempted to contend for control of the territory. Chisholm had friends on both side of the battle, and saw first-hand the devastation wrought on residents of Indian Territory that were caught in the crossfire of battle. He eventually led a band of refugees to the western part of the territory, where they suffered privation, as trade had dried up during the war. At the same time, both Chisholm's father and paternal grandfather were engaged in the slave trade, and Chisholm himself owned slaves.

At the war's end, Chisholm settled permanently near present-day Kingfisher, Oklahoma, and again began to trade in the Indian Territory. Chisholm built up what had previously been a military and Indian trail into a road capable of carrying heavy wagons for his goods. This road later became known as Chisholm's Trail. When the Texas-to-Kansas cattle drives started, the users of the trail renamed it the Chisholm Trail.

== Death and legacy ==
Chisholm died in 1868 at his last camp near Left Hand Spring (now Oklahoma), due to food poisoning. Chisholm was buried there. While this date has historically been recorded as March 4, the CHisholm family bible and contemporaneous newspapers suggest the date may have been April 4.

The term "Chisholm trail" has been used to refer to various combinations of cattle trails, from exclusively the route taken by Jesse Chisholm, to all cattle trails heading north and west out of Texas. The term is first recorded in print in 1870, although it was likely colloquially used before then.

In 1974, Chisholm was inducted into the Hall of Great Westerners. His grave site in Blaine County, Oklahoma is listed on the National Register of Historic Places.
