= Henry Roman Nose =

Cheyenne leader

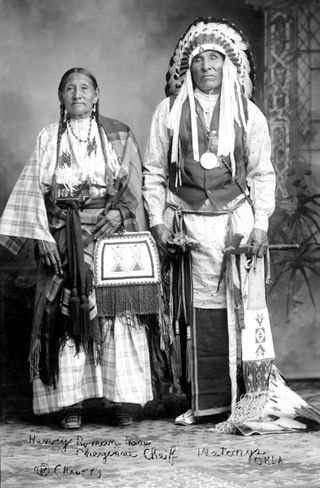
Henry Roman Nose and his wife

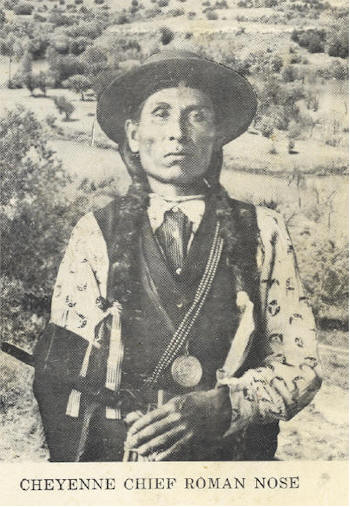
Chief Roman Nose

Chief Henry Roman Nose (June 30, 1856 – June 12, 1917) was a highly respected Southern Cheyenne Chief. Living during turbulent times, Roman Nose was recognized for facilitating a peaceful transition to a non-nomadic way of life, while retaining elements of his Cheyenne culture. He was a vocal proponent of obtaining education and training.

As a young warrior, Henry Roman Nose participated in the Red River War. After being captured, he was sent in 1878 to Fort Marion in St. Augustine, Florida, where he was listed as a "ringleader". After release, he attended the Hampton Institute in Virginia and the Carlisle Institute in Pennsylvania. In 1892, he received a land allotment in current-day Blaine County, Oklahoma. This land later became part of the Roman Nose State Park, which was named in his honor.

Henry Roman Nose died in 1917 in the canyon on which Roman Nose State Park was established.

He is depicted in a mural, "Roman Nose Canyon", at United States Post Office Watonga, painted by Edith Mahier in 1941.
