= Watonga Regional Airport =

Regional airport Watonga, Oklahoma

- IATA: none; ICAO: KJWG; FAA LID: JWG

Summary
- Airport type: Public
- Owner: City of Watonga
- Serves: Watonga, Oklahoma
- Elevation AMSL: 1,551 ft / 473 m
- Coordinates: 35°51′52″N 098°25′15″W

Map
- Location of airport in Oklahoma JWG (the United States)

Runways
| Direction | Length | | Surface |
| Direction | ft | m | Surface |
|---|---|---|---|
| 17/35 | 4,001 | 1,220 | Asphalt |

Statistics (2011)
- Aircraft operations: 2,900
- Based aircraft: 18
- Source: Federal Aviation Administration

Watonga Regional Airport (ICAO: KJWG, FAA LID: JWG) is a city-owned, public-use airport located one nautical mile (2 km) northwest of the central business district of Watonga, a city in Blaine County, Oklahoma, United States. It is included in the National Plan of Integrated Airport Systems for 2011–2015, which categorized it as a general aviation facility.

Although most U.S. airports use the same three-letter location identifier for the FAA and IATA, this airport is assigned JWG by the FAA, but has no designation from the IATA.

== Facilities and aircraft ==
Watonga Regional Airport covers an area of 120 acres (49 ha) at an elevation of 1,551 feet (473 m) above mean sea level. It has one runway designated 17/35 with an asphalt surface measuring 4,001 by 60 feet (1,220 x 18 m).

For the 12-month period ending February 25, 2011, the airport had 2,900 aircraft operations, an average of 241 per month: 73% general aviation and 27% military. At that time there were 18 aircraft based at this airport, all single-engine.

== See also ==
- List of airports in Oklahoma
