= Left Hand Spring (Oklahoma) =

Coordinates: 35°43′35″N 98°17′27″W

Left Hand Spring was a well-known watering stop on the old Chisholm Trail in present-day Blaine County, Oklahoma. The spring was named for Left Hand, an Arapaho chief. Jesse Chisholm died there in 1868.
