= Okeene, Oklahoma =

Town in Oklahoma, US

- Town
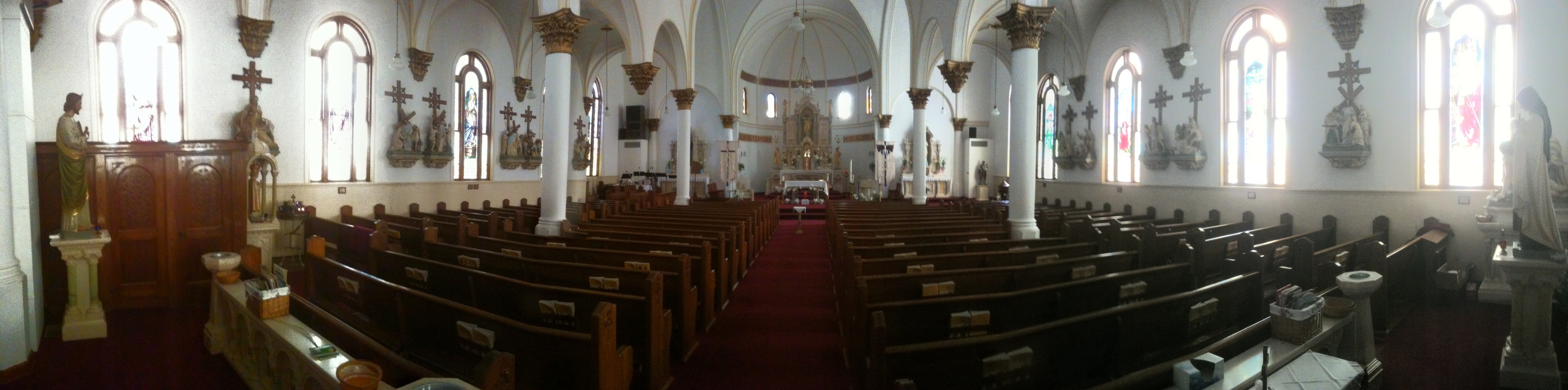
- Interior of St. Anthony's Church

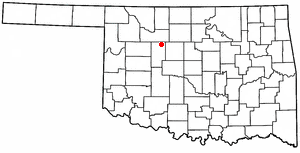
- Location of Okeene, Oklahoma
- Coordinates: 36°07′01″N 98°19′00″W
- Country: United States
- State: Oklahoma
- County: Blaine

Area
  - Total: 2.26 sq mi (5.86 km^{2})
  - Land: 2.26 sq mi (5.86 km^{2})
  - Water: 0 sq mi (0.00 km^{2})
- Elevation: 1,217 ft (371 m)

Population (2020)
  - Total: 1,090
  - Density: 481.6/sq mi (185.93/km^{2})
- Time zone: UTC-6 (Central (CST))
  - Summer (DST): UTC-5 (CDT)
- ZIP code: 73763
- Area code: 580
- FIPS code: 40-54150
- GNIS feature ID: 2413076
- Website: www.okeeneok.com

Okeene is a town in Blaine County, Oklahoma, United States. The population was 1,090 as of the 2020 United States census. The name was created by combining the last letters of Cherokee and Cheyenne.

== Geography ==
Okeene is located in northeastern Blaine County at the intersection of state highways 8 and 51. OK-8 leads south 23 miles (37 km) to Watonga, the county seat, and northwest 20 miles (32 km) to Fairview. OK-51 leads east 24 miles (39 km) to Hennessey and west 17 miles (27 km) to Canton.

According to the United States Census Bureau, Okeene has a total area of 2.30 square miles (5.96 km^{2}), all land.

=== Climate ===
Climate data for Okeene, Oklahoma (1991–2020)
| Month | Jan | Feb | Mar | Apr | May | Jun | Jul | Aug | Sep | Oct | Nov | Dec | Year |
|---|---|---|---|---|---|---|---|---|---|---|---|---|---|
| Mean daily maximum °F (°C) | 50.3 (10.2) | 54.6 (12.6) | 64.9 (18.3) | 74.0 (23.3) | 82.1 (27.8) | 91.2 (32.9) | 95.8 (35.4) | 94.6 (34.8) | 86.8 (30.4) | 75.0 (23.9) | 61.1 (16.2) | 50.8 (10.4) | 73.4 (23.0) |
| Daily mean °F (°C) | 38.7 (3.7) | 42.2 (5.7) | 51.8 (11.0) | 60.1 (15.6) | 69.3 (20.7) | 78.7 (25.9) | 83.1 (28.4) | 81.8 (27.7) | 74.1 (23.4) | 62.3 (16.8) | 49.4 (9.7) | 40.2 (4.6) | 61.0 (16.1) |
| Mean daily minimum °F (°C) | 27.1 (−2.7) | 29.7 (−1.3) | 38.6 (3.7) | 46.3 (7.9) | 56.5 (13.6) | 66.3 (19.1) | 70.5 (21.4) | 69.0 (20.6) | 61.4 (16.3) | 49.6 (9.8) | 37.6 (3.1) | 29.6 (−1.3) | 48.5 (9.2) |
| Average precipitation inches (mm) | 0.89 (23) | 1.49 (38) | 2.39 (61) | 2.97 (75) | 4.39 (112) | 4.03 (102) | 2.72 (69) | 3.49 (89) | 2.28 (58) | 2.73 (69) | 1.70 (43) | 1.47 (37) | 30.55 (776) |
| Average snowfall inches (cm) | 2.7 (6.9) | 1.8 (4.6) | 2.0 (5.1) | 0.0 (0.0) | 0.0 (0.0) | 0.0 (0.0) | 0.0 (0.0) | 0.0 (0.0) | 0.0 (0.0) | 0.2 (0.51) | 0.3 (0.76) | 3.3 (8.4) | 10.3 (26.27) |
Source: NOAA

== Demographics ==
Historical population
| Census | Pop. | Note | %± |
|---|---|---|---|
| 1910 | 920 | | — |
| 1920 | 1,084 | | 17.8% |
| 1930 | 1,035 | | −4.5% |
| 1940 | 1,079 | | 4.3% |
| 1950 | 1,170 | | 8.4% |
| 1960 | 1,164 | | −0.5% |
| 1970 | 1,421 | | 22.1% |
| 1980 | 1,601 | | 12.7% |
| 1990 | 1,343 | | −16.1% |
| 2000 | 1,240 | | −7.7% |
| 2010 | 1,204 | | −2.9% |
| 2020 | 1,090 | | −9.5% |
U.S. Decennial Census

=== 2020 census ===
As of the 2020 census, the population was 1,090. The median age was 40.2 years. 25.0% of residents were under the age of 18 and 20.7% of residents were 65 years of age or older. For every 100 females there were 101.9 males, and for every 100 females age 18 and over there were 95.9 males age 18 and over.

0.0% of residents lived in urban areas, while 100.0% lived in rural areas.

There were 446 households, of which 32.7% had children under the age of 18 living in them. Of all households, 47.8% were married-couple households, 20.2% were households with a male householder and no spouse or partner present, and 26.2% were households with a female householder and no spouse or partner present. About 30.2% of all households were made up of individuals and 14.5% had someone living alone who was 65 years of age or older.

There were 536 housing units, of which 16.8% were vacant. The homeowner vacancy rate was 4.3% and the rental vacancy rate was 16.0%.

Racial composition as of the 2020 census
| Race | Number | Percent |
|---|---|---|
| White | 897 | 82.3% |
| Black or African American | 6 | 0.6% |
| American Indian and Alaska Native | 20 | 1.8% |
| Asian | 5 | 0.5% |
| Native Hawaiian and Other Pacific Islander | 3 | 0.3% |
| Some other race | 56 | 5.1% |
| Two or more races | 103 | 9.4% |
| Hispanic or Latino (of any race) | 161 | 14.8% |

=== 2000 census ===
As of the census of 2000, there were 1,240 people, 504 households, and 336 families residing in the town. The population density was 541.2 inhabitants per square mile (209.0/km^{2}). There were 603 housing units at an average density of 263.2 per square mile (101.6/km^{2}). The racial makeup of the town was 97.34% White, 0.48% African American, 0.48% Native American, 0.08% Asian, 0.81% from other races, and 0.81% from two or more races. Hispanic or Latino of any race were 3.87% of the population.

There were 504 households, out of which 29.6% had children under the age of 18 living with them, 56.5% were married couples living together, 7.3% had a female householder with no husband present, and 33.3% were non-families. 31.7% of all households were made up of individuals, and 19.6% had someone living alone who was 65 years of age or older. The average household size was 2.34 and the average family size was 2.95.

In the town, the population was spread out, with 25.4% under the age of 18, 6.3% from 18 to 24, 23.1% from 25 to 44, 22.2% from 45 to 64, and 23.0% who were 65 years of age or older. The median age was 41 years. For every 100 females, there were 94.1 males. For every 100 females age 18 and over, there were 89.9 males.

The median income for a household in the town was $31,471, and the median income for a family was $37,917. Males had a median income of $28,500 versus $19,297 for females. The per capita income for the town was $18,444. About 8.6% of families and 9.9% of the population were below the poverty line, including 12.5% of those under age 18 and 6.4% of those age 65 or over.

== Public School System ==
Okeene's public school system consists of an elementary school, middle school, and high school.

== Historic Sites ==
St. Anthony of Padua Church was begun on December 20, 1921, and completed in 1924 at a cost of $85,000, not including donated work and materials. It stands as one of the oldest churches in Oklahoma.

Three NHRP-listed sites are located in Okeene, being the Okeene Flour Mill off Oklahoma State Highway 51, the Sooner Co-op Association Elevator (West) at 302 West F Street, and the Shinn Family Barn to the southeast.
