= Southard, Oklahoma =

Unincorporated community in Oklahoma, US

- Unincorporated community
- Location within Oklahoma
- Coordinates: 36°03′21″N 98°28′31″W
- Country: United States
- State: Oklahoma
- County: Blaine
- Elevation: 1,545 ft (471 m)
- Time zone: UTC-6 (Central (CST))
  - Summer (DST): UTC-5 (CDT)
- ZIP code: 73770
- Area code: 580
- GNIS feature ID: 1098285

Southard is an unincorporated community in Blaine County, Oklahoma, United States. Southard is located near the intersection of State Highway 51 and State Highway 51A, 6.3 miles (10.1 km) east of Canton. Southard has a post office with ZIP code 73770.
