= Eagle City, Oklahoma =

Unincorporated community in Oklahoma, US

Eagle City
- Unincorporated community and Census designated place
- Location within the state of Oklahoma Eagle City (the United States)
- Coordinates: 35°56′02″N 98°35′24″W
- Country: United States
- State: Oklahoma
- County: Blaine

Area
  - Total: 0.67 sq mi (1.74 km^{2})
  - Land: 0.67 sq mi (1.74 km^{2})
  - Water: 0 sq mi (0.00 km^{2})
- Elevation: 1,706 ft (520 m)

Population (2020)
  - Total: 40
  - Density: 59.4/sq mi (22.94/km^{2})
- Time zone: UTC-6 (Central (CST))
  - Summer (DST): UTC-5 (CDT)
- ZIP codes: 73658
- FIPS code: 40-22300
- GNIS feature ID: 2805314
- Website: www.ghosttowns.com/states/ok/eaglecity.html

Eagle City is a census designated place located along and west of State Highway 58 in western Blaine County, Oklahoma, United States. As of the 2020 census, Eagle City had a population of 40. Established on the Frisco Line before statehood, the post office which opened July 26, 1902 was named Dillon. The name was changed to Eagle City September 4, 1909. The ZIP Code is 73658. The nearest post office is now in Oakwood.

== Demographics ==
Historical population
Census	Pop.	Note	%±
2020	40		—
U.S. Decennial Census

=== 2020 census ===
As of the 2020 census, Eagle City had a population of 40. The median age was 46.3 years. 5.0% of residents were under the age of 18 and 15.0% of residents were 65 years of age or older. For every 100 females there were 122.2 males, and for every 100 females age 18 and over there were 137.5 males age 18 and over.

0.0% of residents lived in urban areas, while 100.0% lived in rural areas.

There were 14 households in Eagle City, of which 21.4% had children under the age of 18 living in them. Of all households, 42.9% were married-couple households, 14.3% were households with a male householder and no spouse or partner present, and 42.9% were households with a female householder and no spouse or partner present. About 28.6% of all households were made up of individuals and 14.2% had someone living alone who was 65 years of age or older.

There were 24 housing units, of which 41.7% were vacant. The homeowner vacancy rate was 0.0% and the rental vacancy rate was 0.0%.

Racial composition as of the 2020 census
Race	Number	Percent
White	38	95.0%
Black or African American	0	0.0%
American Indian and Alaska Native	0	0.0%
Asian	0	0.0%
Native Hawaiian and Other Pacific Islander	0	0.0%
Some other race	0	0.0%
Two or more races	2	5.0%
Hispanic or Latino (of any race)	1	2.5%
