= Acre Family Barn =

- U.S. National Register of Historic Places
- Location within Oklahoma
- Nearest city: Canton, Oklahoma
- Coordinates: 36°02′21″N 98°36′09″W
- Area: less than one acre
- Built: c.1916; 110 years ago
- Built by: Acre Family
- Architectural style: Barn
- NRHP reference No.: 13000073
- Added to NRHP: March 13, 2013

The Acre Family Barn, in Blaine County, Oklahoma near Canton, Oklahoma, was listed on the National Register of Historic Places in 2013.

It is a 42 by 37 feet (13 m × 11 m) "one-and-one-half story, medium-sized Transverse crib barn" built around 1916. It is located about 3 miles (4.8 km) southwest of Canton.

It is one of 11 historic barns in Oklahoma listed on the National Register.
