= Trevon Hartfield =

American football player (born 1991)

No. 45
- Position: Safety

Personal information
- Born: November 17, 1991 (age 34); Watonga, Oklahoma, U.S.
- Listed height: 6 ft 0 in (1.83 m)
- Listed weight: 195 lb (88 kg)

Career information
- High school: Watonga (Watonga, Oklahoma)
- College: Southwestern Oklahoma State
- NFL draft: 2016: undrafted

Career history
- Arizona Cardinals (2016); Tennessee Titans (2017)*; Kansas City Chiefs (2017)*; Cleveland Browns (2017)*
- * Offseason or practice squad member only

Awards and highlights
- First-team All-GAC (2015)
- Stats at Pro Football Reference

Trevon Hartfield (born November 17, 1991) is an American former football safety. He played college football at Southwestern Oklahoma State.

== College career ==
Hartfield first attended Northern Oklahoma College in Enid, Oklahoma, where he played basketball in 2010. He then transferred to Southern Nazarene University in 2011, where he joined the football team. In 2011 and 2012, he recorded 69 tackles, 8.5 tackles-for-loss, five interceptions, and 13 passes defended. He also returned 15 kickoffs for 348 yards, including a school record 95-yard touchdown. In 2011, he earned All-league honorable mention as a kick returner.

After spending two years out of school and sports, he enrolled at Southwestern Oklahoma State University in 2015. In his lone season there, he appeared in 12 games. He recorded 73 tackles, 2.5 tackles-for-loss, 25 passes defensed, five interceptions, and two forced fumbles. He also returned 10 kickoffs for 264 yards. He was named first-team All-Great American Conference.

== Professional career ==
=== Arizona Cardinals ===
After going undrafted in the 2016 NFL draft, Hartfield signed with the Arizona Cardinals on May 2, 2016. He was released during final cuts on September 3, 2016 and was signed to the Cardinals' practice squad on September 12, 2016. He was promoted to the active roster on December 23, 2016. On May 10, 2017, he was released by the Cardinals.

=== Tennessee Titans ===
On May 15, 2017, Hartfield was signed by the Tennessee Titans. He was waived on June 13, 2017.

=== Kansas City Chiefs ===
On June 16, 2017, Hartfield signed with the Kansas City Chiefs. He was waived on September 2, 2017.

=== Cleveland Browns ===
On December 19, 2017, Hartfield was signed to the Cleveland Browns' practice squad. He signed a reserve/future contract with the Browns on January 1, 2018. He was released on March 15, 2018.
