= Roman Nose State Park =

State park in Oklahoma, United States

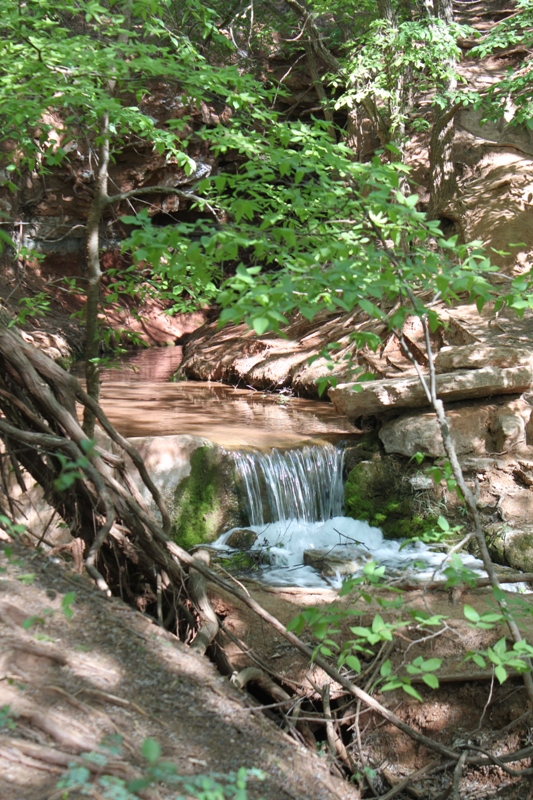
- A stream in Roman Nose State Park

- Location within Oklahoma
- Location: Blaine County, Oklahoma, United States
- Nearest city: Watonga, OK
- Coordinates: 35°56′11″N 98°25′30″W
- Established: 1937
- Visitors: 297,630 (in 2021)
- Governing body: Oklahoma Tourism and Recreation Department
- Website: www.travelok.com/listings/view.profile/id.6460

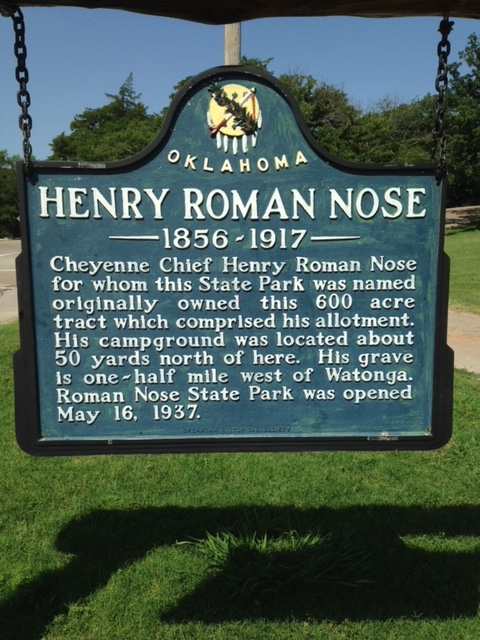
Roman Nose State Park

Roman Nose State Park is a state park located in Blaine County, 7 miles (11 km) north of Watonga, Oklahoma. Roman Nose State Park is one of the original seven Oklahoma state parks. Sitting in a small canyon, recreation activities at this state park include a golf course, swimming pools, hiking trails, two lakes (Lake Watonga and Lake Boecher), trout fishing in season, canoeing, paddle boats, mountain biking, horse stables and hayrides.

For lodging, the park has Roman Nose Lodge, built in 1956 and renovated in 2010, along with more than 90 campsites, almost equally split between RV and tent sites.

== History ==
The state park was created in 1937 by the Civilian Conservation Corps as part of President Franklin Roosevelt's New Deal programs.

The state park was named after the Cheyenne chief Henry Roman Nose, who died in the canyon in 1917.

== Wildlife ==
Whitetail Deer are not uncommon to see while staying there. The park is also home to more than 85 different species of birds, including wild turkeys, cardinals, robins, mourning doves, blue grosbeaks, and herons. Some raptors are present including great horned owls, red-tailed hawks, and even bald eagles.
