= Blaine County Courthouse (Oklahoma) =

- U.S. National Register of Historic Places
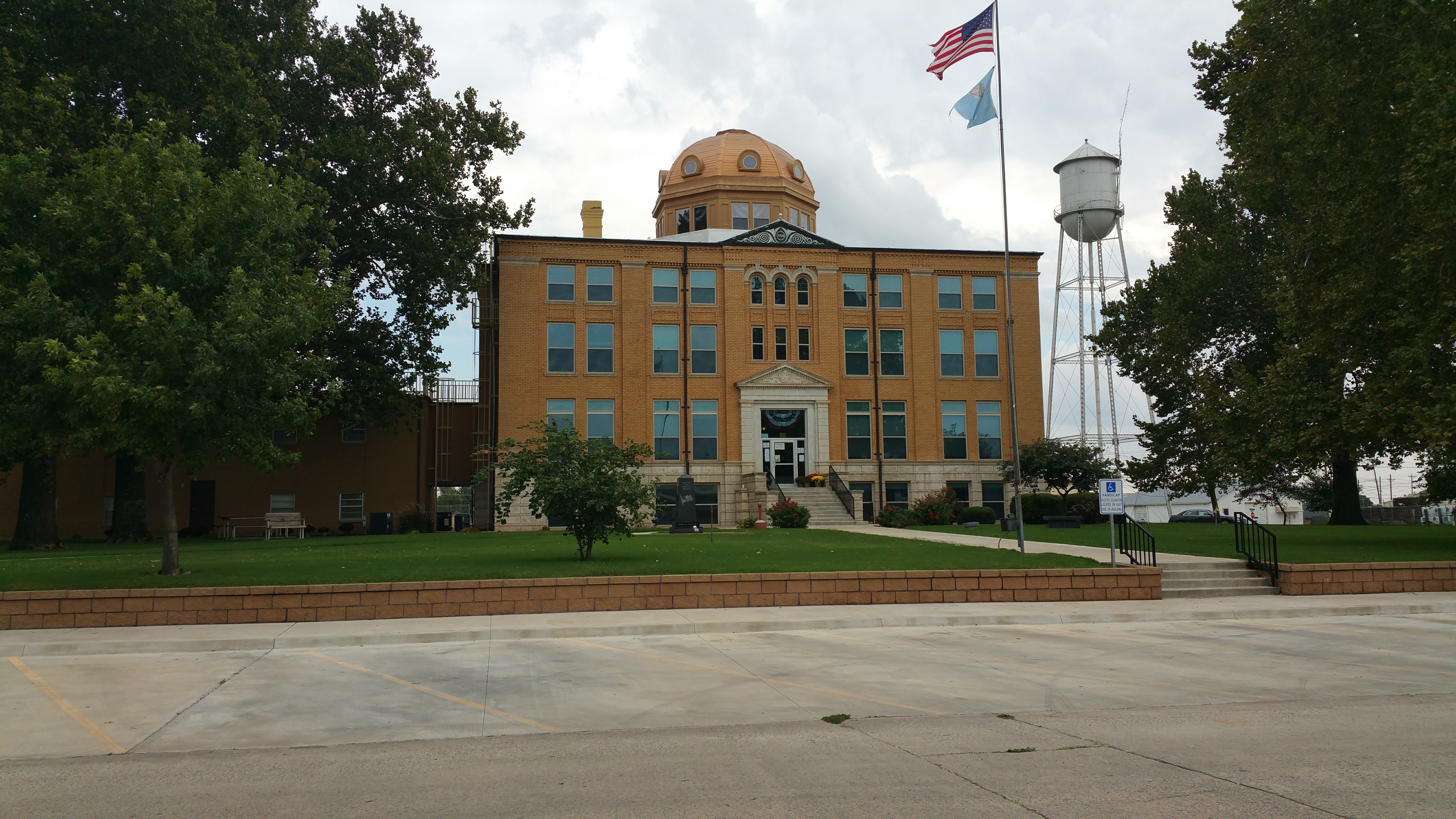

- Location within Oklahoma Location within the United States
- Interactive map showing the location of Blaine County Courthouse
- Location: 212 N. Weigle St., Watonga, Oklahoma
- Coordinates: 35°50′46″N 98°24′38″W
- Area: 1 acre (0.40 ha)
- Built: 1906
- MPS: County Courthouses of Oklahoma TR
- NRHP reference No.: 84002972
- Added to NRHP: August 23, 1984

The Blaine County Courthouse in Watonga, Oklahoma was built in 1906, the year before Oklahoma received statehood. It has been asserted to be "one of the most imposing structures in Watonga" and it "serves as a landmark for both the town and the county," Blaine County. It has a large central dome, a pedimented entrance, and a pediment above its cornice whose tympanum is painted with spirals and the date "1906". Its front facade also features an arcade of three arched windows on the third and fourth story levels.

It was listed on the National Register of Historic Places in 1984. It is a four-story tan brick building on a concrete foundation. It was deemed significant for its architecture and for its association with county history. The architect and builder(s) were unknown at the date of National Register listing.

A breezeway connects the historic building to a two-story addition on the south side.

It was one of a group of Oklahoma courthouses studied together and listed on the National Register in 1983.
