= United States Post Office Watonga =

- U.S. National Register of Historic Places
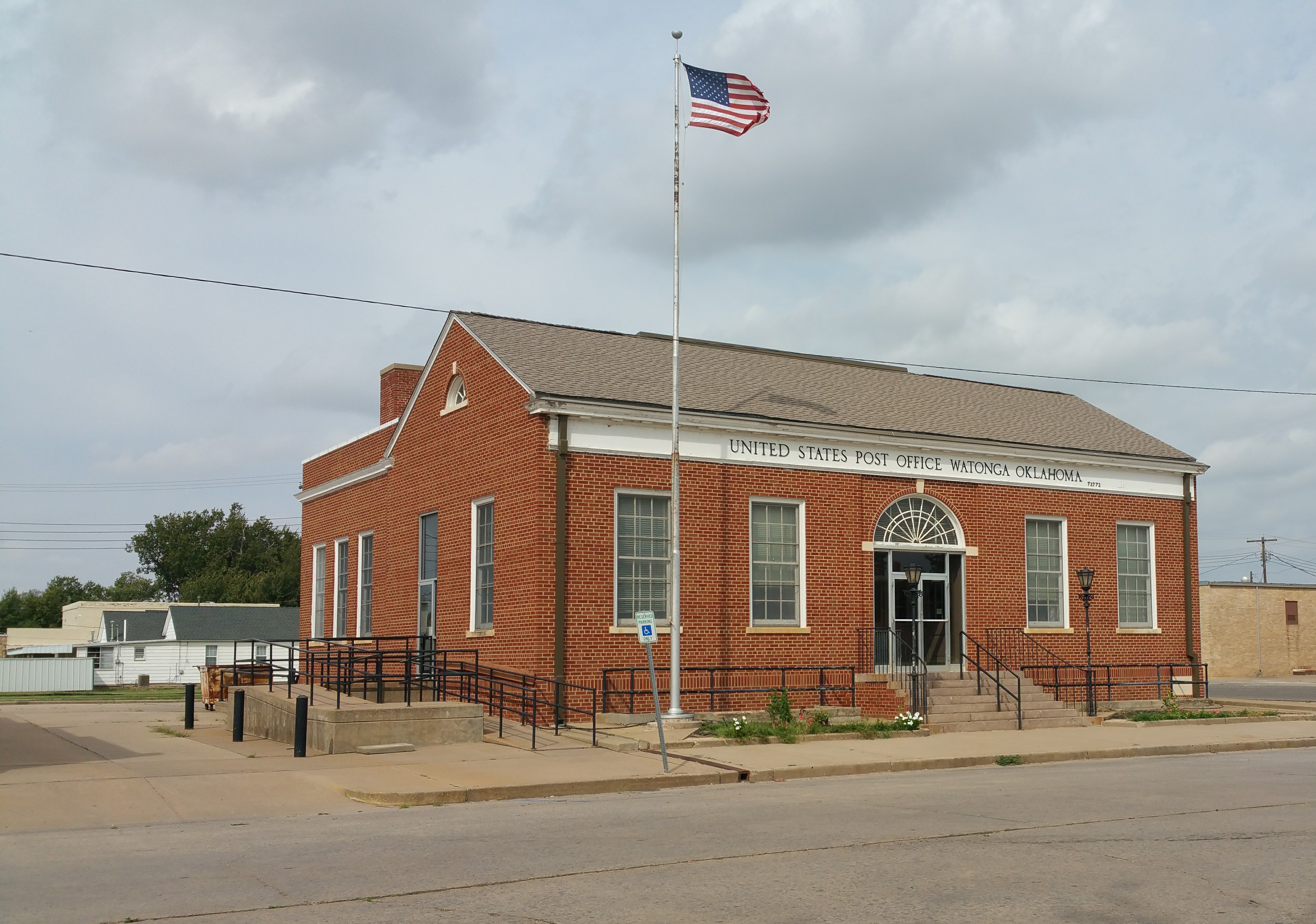

- Location within Oklahoma Location within the United States
- Location: 121 N. Noble Ave., Watonga, Oklahoma
- Coordinates: 35°50′41″N 98°24′47″W
- Area: less than one acre
- Built: 1936
- Architect: Louis A. Simon
- Architectural style: Colonial Revival
- MPS: Oklahoma Post Offices with Section Art MPS
- NRHP reference No.: 09000213
- Added to NRHP: April 17, 2009

The United States Post Office Watonga, in Watonga, Oklahoma, is a Colonial Revival-style building built in 1936. It was listed on the National Register of Historic Places in 2009.

It is a one-and-a-half-story brick-clad building. Its front facade has decorative detail at the front entrance, including a round arch fanlight above, and brickwork suggestive of pilasters by the sidelights of the doorway. It has four nine-over-nine double-hung windows

Its lobby has a mural, "Roman Nose Canyon", by artist Edith Mahier.

The mural, installed in 1941, is oil on canvas which nicely fits in a wall space above the postmaster's door. In the mural the Cheyenne chief Henry Roman Nose stands holding a rifle, with his family to the right and three Cheyenne riding horses to the left. A family of settlers with a Conestoga wagon and three other white men exploring the area. The Native Americans and white settlers have both arrived at the location to water their horses and livestock. It depicts the canyon where Roman Nose lived during 1856–1917 in bright orange and red colors. The mural was locally controversial in its depiction of Native Americans, and it is likely the most well-known of post office murals in Oklahoma.
