= Noble Hotel =

- U.S. National Register of Historic Places
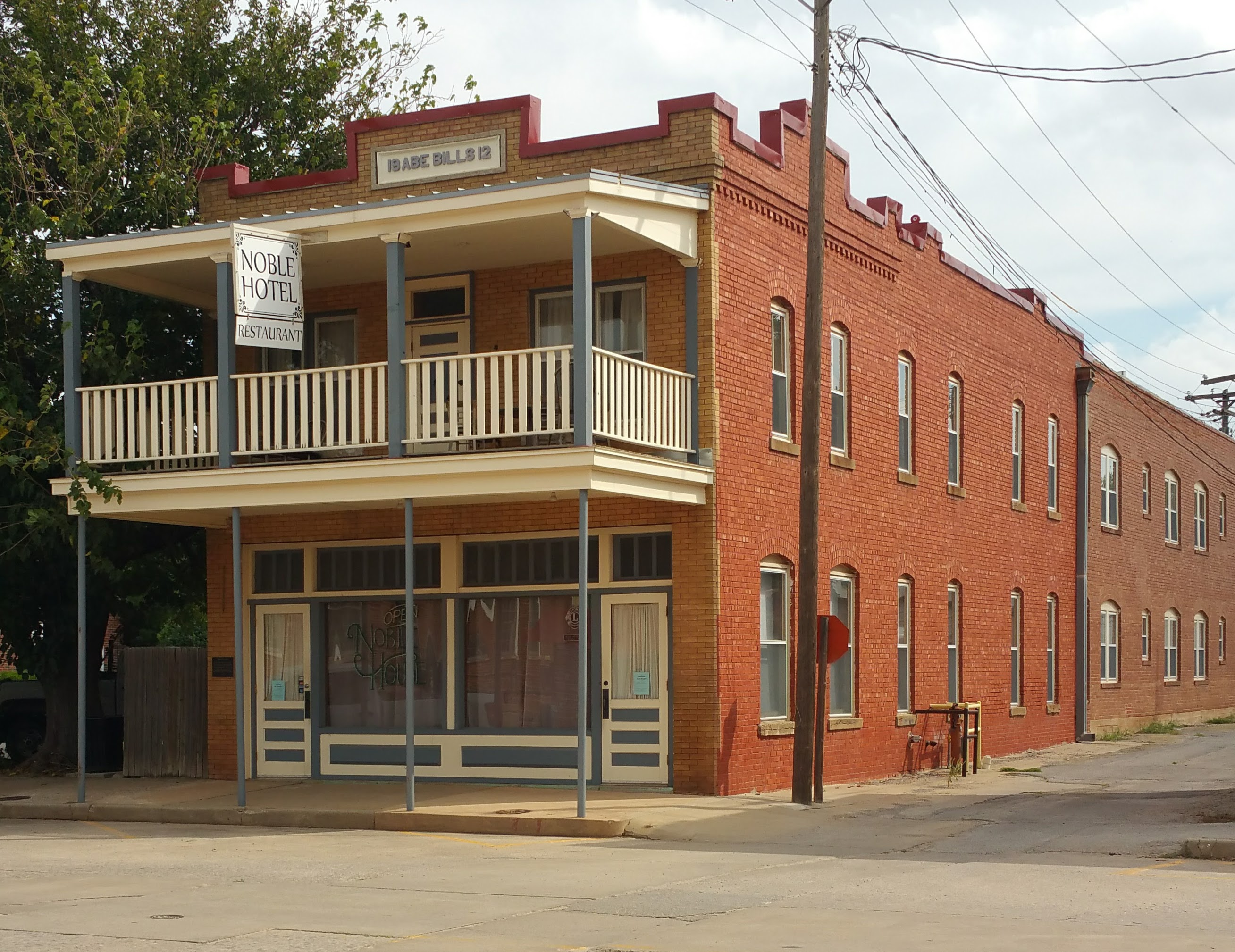

- Location within Oklahoma
- Location: 112 N. Noble St., Watonga, Oklahoma
- Coordinates: 35°50′41″N 98°24′45″W
- Area: less than one acre
- Built: 1912, 1937
- Built by: Reynolds, W.H.
- Architectural style: Early Commercial
- NRHP reference No.: 96000491
- Added to NRHP: May 10, 1996

The Noble Hotel, at 112 N. Noble St. in Watonga, Oklahoma, is a two-story red brick hotel which was built in 1912 and 1937. It was listed on the National Register of Historic Places in 1996.

It was originally built to a 25 by 65 feet (7.6 m × 19.8 m) plan, and was doubled in size to 25 by 130 feet (7.6 m × 39.6 m) later. It has been suggested that it is "Prairie Commercial" in style.

The building contains various rooms lightly themed off of various peoples' nicknames, as well as providing bed and breakfast, and hosting the local Lions club of Watonga, Oklahoma.
