= Geary, Oklahoma =

City in Oklahoma, US

- City
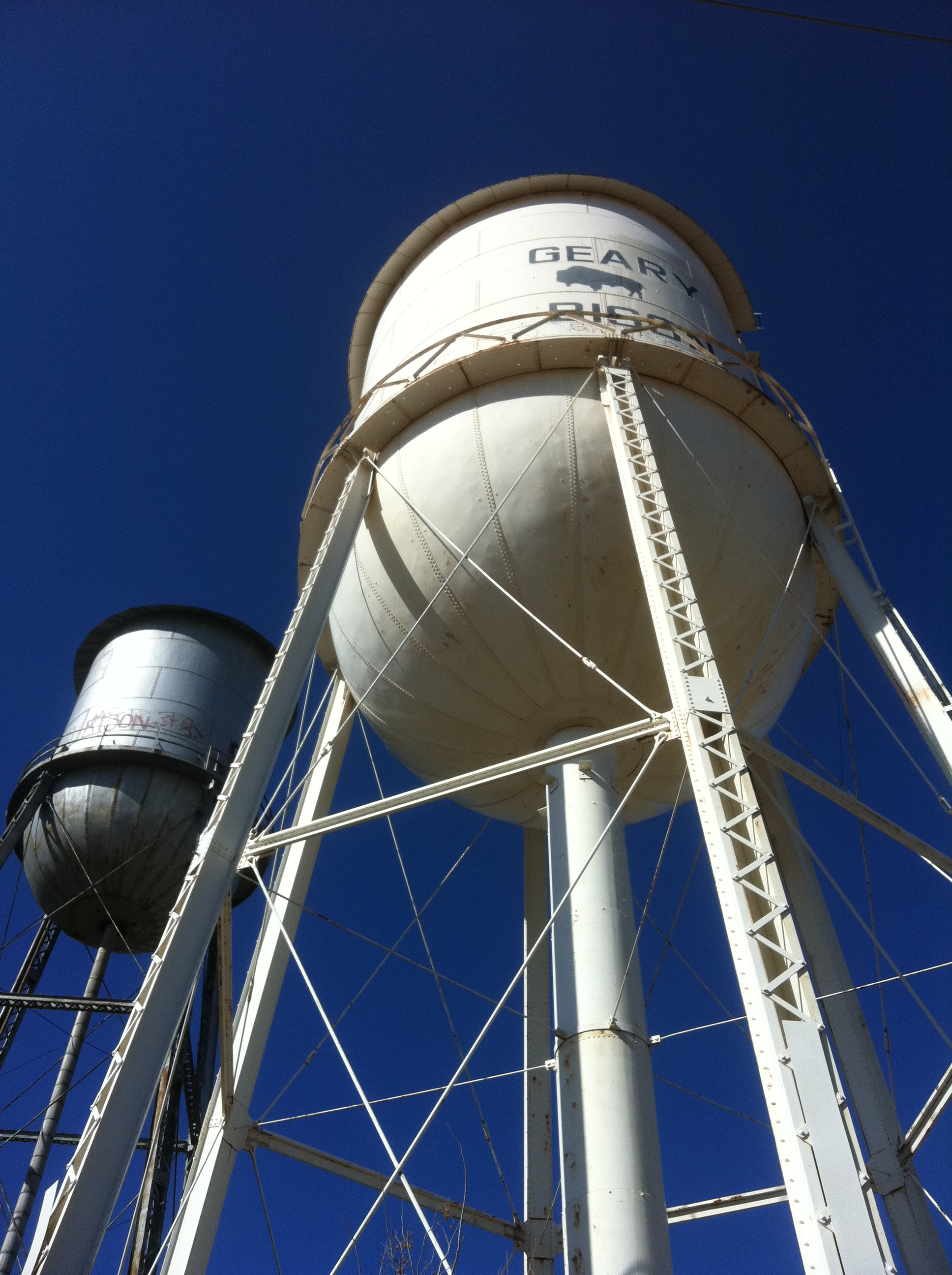
- Geary water tower

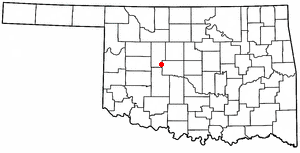
- Location of Geary, Oklahoma
- Coordinates: 35°37′46″N 98°19′5″W
- Country: United States
- State: Oklahoma
- Counties: Blaine, Canadian

Government
  - Type: Aldermanic
  - Mayor: Waylan Upchego

Area
  - Total: 4.14 sq mi (10.73 km^{2})
  - Land: 4.14 sq mi (10.73 km^{2})
  - Water: 0.0039 sq mi (0.01 km^{2})
- Elevation: 1,598 ft (487 m)

Population (2020)
  - Total: 994
  - Density: 240.0/sq mi (92.68/km^{2})
- Time zone: UTC-6 (Central (CST))
  - Summer (DST): UTC-5 (CDT)
- ZIP code: 73040
- Area codes: 405/572
- FIPS code: 40-28900
- GNIS feature ID: 2410579
- Website: www.cityofgeary.com

Geary is a city in Blaine and Canadian counties in the U.S. state of Oklahoma. The population was 994 at the 2020 census. The town was named for Edmund Guerrier, a scout and an interpreter for the U.S. Army. On October 31, 2024 the entire Geary Police Department resigned. Police Chief Alicia Ford along with three other officers. On the same day two members of the City Council members resigned as well.

== History ==
The area occupied by the present city of Geary was previously part of the Cheyenne-Arapaho reservation until it was opened in April, 1892 for settlement by non-Indians. Shuffle Huff and his son, William, filed several land claims in the area and sold two quarter sections to a land development company. A community was begun about 1.5 miles (2.4 km) northwest of its present location. Settlers moved the town to the present site to be located on the proposed route of the Choctaw, Oklahoma and Gulf Railroad line that was to be built west from El Reno.

Edmund Guerriere, of French - Cheyenne ancestry and a former Army scout and interpreter, had acquired a land allotment about 3 miles (4.8 km) northeast of the town. According to the Encyclopedia of Oklahoma History and Culture, the town name was spelled "Geary" because the settlers had difficulty spelling and pronouncing the original name. The Geary post office was established October 12, 1892.

In the 1901-1902 timeframe, the town became the starting point for a second railway, the Choctaw Northern Railroad, which ran north all the way to Anthony, Kansas. Quickly becoming a trade center for the agricultural area that surrounded it, Geary was established as a "first-class city" in Oklahoma Territory in 1902. The population had grown to 2,561 in that year. That number declined to 1,565 by the time of statehood in 1907.

In October 2024, prior to the end of the month, three city council positions were filled, with the fourth seat not being occupied. October 31, 2024, all of the municipal police officers resigned at the same time, as did two members of the city council.

== Geography ==
Geary is located in southern Blaine County and northwestern Canadian County. The city limits extend southeast along U.S. Route 281 8 miles (13 km) from the center of town to Exit 108 on Interstate 40. From this point it is 43 miles (69 km) east to downtown Oklahoma City. U.S. Route 270 leads east from Geary 11 miles (18 km) to Calumet. U.S. 281 and 270 together lead northwest 17 miles (27 km) to Watonga.

According to the United States Census Bureau, as of 2010 the city has a total area of 4.15 square miles (10.75 km^{2}), of which 0.004 square miles (0.01 km^{2}), or 0.06%, is water.

== Demographics ==
Historical population
Census	Pop.	Note	%±
1910	1,452		—
1920	1,167		−19.6%
1930	1,892		62.1%
1940	1,634		−13.6%
1950	1,614		−1.2%
1960	1,416		−12.3%
1970	1,380		−2.5%
1980	1,700		23.2%
1990	1,347		−20.8%
2000	1,258		−6.6%
2010	1,280		1.7%
2020	994		−22.3%
U.S. Decennial Census

=== 2020 census ===
As of the 2020 census, Geary had a population of 994, a median age of 38.6 years, 26.3% of residents under the age of 18, and 16.3% of residents 65 years of age or older. For every 100 females there were 96.4 males, and for every 100 females age 18 and over there were 97.6 males.

0% of residents lived in urban areas, while 100.0% lived in rural areas.

There were 408 households in Geary, of which 32.1% had children under the age of 18 living in them. Of all households, 36.0% were married-couple households, 23.0% were households with a male householder and no spouse or partner present, and 33.3% were households with a female householder and no spouse or partner present. About 36.7% of all households were made up of individuals and 16.1% had someone living alone who was 65 years of age or older.

There were 535 housing units, of which 23.7% were vacant. Among occupied housing units, 71.8% were owner-occupied and 28.2% were renter-occupied. The homeowner vacancy rate was 4.2% and the rental vacancy rate was 14.8%.

Racial composition as of the 2020 census
Race	Percent
White	60.3%
Black or African American	1.4%
American Indian and Alaska Native	19.8%
Asian	0.1%
Native Hawaiian and Other Pacific Islander	0%
Some other race	4.3%
Two or more races	14.1%
Hispanic or Latino (of any race)	11.4%

=== 2000 census ===
As of the census of 2000, there were 1,258 people, 475 households, and 305 families residing in the city. The population density was 1,325.1 inhabitants per square mile (511.6/km^{2}). There were 583 housing units at an average density of 614.1 per square mile (237.1/km^{2}). The racial makeup of the city was 65.50% White, 4.85% African American, 22.89% Native American, 0.08% Asian, 2.62% from other races, and 4.05% from two or more races. Hispanic or Latino of any race were 5.41% of the population.

There were 475 households, out of which 30.5% had children under the age of 18 living with them, 43.2% were married couples living together, 15.8% had a female householder with no husband present, and 35.8% were non-families. 32.2% of all households were made up of individuals, and 14.5% had someone living alone who was 65 years of age or older. The average household size was 2.56, and the average family size was 3.27.

In the city, the population was spread out, with 29.3% under the age of 18, 7.2% from 18 to 24, 25.8% from 25 to 44, 19.6% from 45 to 64, and 18.0% who were 65 years of age or older. The median age was 35 years. For every 100 females, there were 90.9 males. For every 100 females age 18 and over, there were 90.0 males.

The median income for a household in the city was $23,088, and the median income for a family was $28,409. Males had a median income of $23,021 versus $16,667 for females. The per capita income for the city was $10,538. About 21.2% of families and 24.9% of the population were below the poverty line, including 25.7% of those under age 18 and 18.0% of those age 65 or over.

== Government and infrastructure ==
The city council has four positions.

Geary has a municipal police department. In 2024, there was one department head and three officers in that department. After the mass resignations on October 31, 2024, coverage came from the Blaine County Sheriff's Department and the Canadian County Sheriff's Department.

== Climate ==
Climate data for Geary, Oklahoma
Month	Jan	Feb	Mar	Apr	May	Jun	Jul	Aug	Sep	Oct	Nov	Dec	Year
Mean daily maximum °F (°C)	46 (8)	51 (11)	60 (16)	71 (22)	78 (26)	87 (31)	93 (34)	93 (34)	84 (29)	73 (23)	59 (15)	50 (10)	70 (22)
Mean daily minimum °F (°C)	26 (−3)	30 (−1)	35 (2)	46 (8)	55 (13)	66 (19)	69 (21)	68 (20)	60 (16)	50 (10)	37 (3)	30 (−1)	48 (9)
Average precipitation inches (mm)	0.9 (23)	1.1 (28)	1.9 (48)	2.8 (71)	4.3 (110)	4.0 (100)	2.3 (58)	2.5 (64)	3.3 (84)	2.5 (64)	1.7 (43)	1.3 (33)	28.7 (730)
Source 1: weather.com
Source 2: Weatherbase.com

== Education ==
The Blane County portion, which includes part of the townsite, is in the Geary Public Schools school district. The remainder of the townsite, in Canadian County, is also in Geary Public Schools. Some city territory in Canadian County along U.S. Route 281 extends into the Hinton Public Schools school district and the Maple Public School school district.

== Notable people ==
- Shon Gables, an evening news anchor with WANF in Atlanta.
- Edmund Guerrier, scout, guide, interpreter, mixed blood Cheyenne, and Sand Creek massacre survivor (1840–1921) after whom the city was named.
