= Blaine County, Oklahoma =

County in Oklahoma, United States

- County
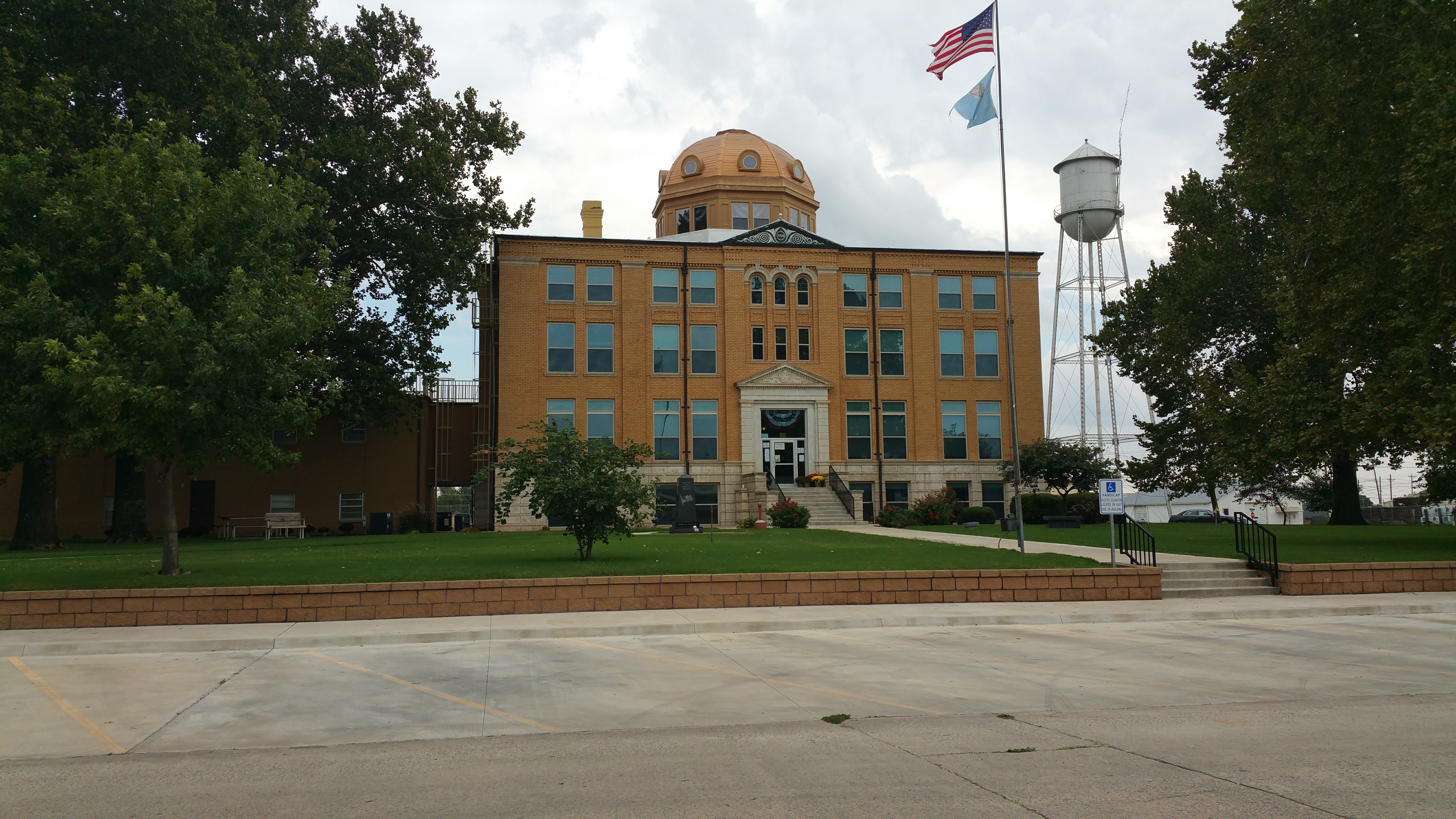
- Blaine County Courthouse in Watonga

- Location within the U.S. state of Oklahoma
- Coordinates: 35°53′N 98°26′W
- Country: United States
- State: Oklahoma
- Founded: 1892
- Named for: James G. Blaine
- Seat: Watonga
- Largest city: Watonga

Area
  - Total: 939 sq mi (2,430 km^{2})
  - Land: 928 sq mi (2,400 km^{2})
  - Water: 10 sq mi (26 km^{2}) 1.1%

Population (2020)
  - Total: 8,735
  - Estimate (2025): 8,515 ▼
  - Density: 9.3/sq mi (3.6/km^{2})
- Time zone: UTC−6 (Central)
  - Summer (DST): UTC−5 (CDT)
- Congressional district: 3rd
- Website: blaine.okcounties.org

Blaine County is a county located in the U.S. state of Oklahoma. As of the 2020 census, the population was 8,735. Its county seat is Watonga. Part of the Cheyenne-Arapaho land opening in 1892, the county had gained rail lines by the early 1900s and highways by the 1930s. The county was named for James G. Blaine, an American politician who was the Republican presidential candidate in 1884 and Secretary of State under President Benjamin Harrison.

== History ==
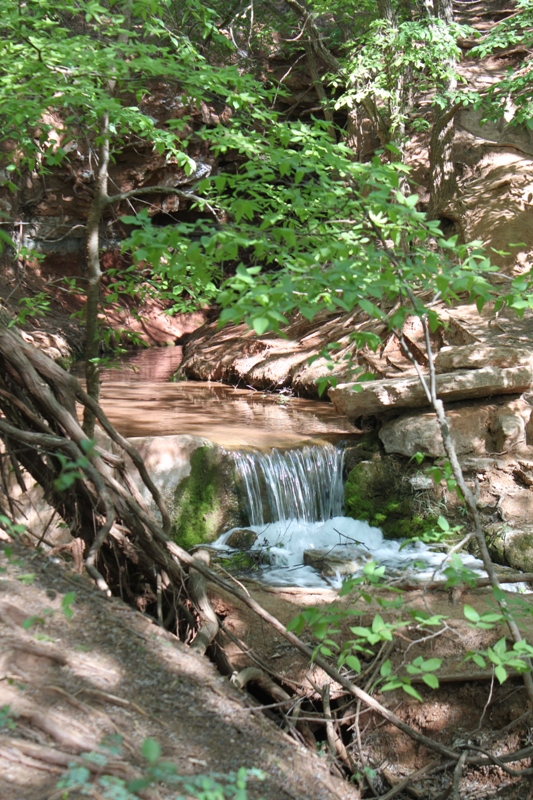
Roman Nose State Park

Blaine County was one of several counties created by the Land Run of 1892. It was designated county "C" in 1890 before the land run. According to one account, the designation "C" remained until the first public elections in 1892. When the time came to choose another name for the county, there seemed to be roughly equal support for two military heroes: "Sheridan" and "Custer". Before voting began, the chair gave a stirring speech proposing Blaine, who had recently died and was a local favorite. The majority of voters swung behind Blaine's name, which was ultimately chosen for County C. The area was settled by Creek and Seminole, whom the federal government relocated to the area in the 1820s and 1830s. The Cheyenne and Arapaho tribes were relocated to the area from Colorado in 1869 after the Reconstruction Treaties of 1866 had taken the land back from the Creek and Seminole.

The land run was held after giving members of the tribe allotments of 160 acres (0.65 km^{2}) each.

A post office was established in the county seat of Watonga, the same year as the land run. The Enid and Anadarko Railway and the Blackwell, Enid, and Southwestern Railroad ran lines through the county from 1901 to 1903. The Blaine County Courthouse was built in 1906.

The town of Geary, which also received a post office in the same year as the land run, became an agricultural trade center in the county and had a population of 2,561 by 1902. The town was home to "the oldest bank in Blaine County." Okeene was also established in the year of the land run and was surrounded by farmers of German descent.

In 1904, Blaine County was the birthplace of voice actor Clarence Nash, the original voice of Disney's Donald Duck. The county's population was 17,227 in 1907, rising to 17,960 in 1910. It had declined to 15,875 by 1920.

The U.S. highway system reached Oklahoma in 1926. U.S. Highways 270 and 281 were constructed through Blaine County. The county was also served by the Postal Highway as early as 1912; it later became part of U.S. Highway 66.

The county's population peaked at 20,452 in 1930. New Deal programs such as the Civilian Conservation Corps employed county residents and built Roman Nose State Park, which opened in 1937.

By the 21st century, the county had a population of 11,976.

== Government ==
The county is served by seven elected county officials: a county sheriff, three county commissioners, a county clerk, a county assessor, and a county treasurer. The three commissioners each have districts with approximately equal populations based on the latest census. The county government is primarily housed in the Blaine County Courthouse in Watonga.

== Geography ==
According to the U.S. Census Bureau, the county has a total area of 939 square miles (2,430 km^{2}), of which 928 square miles (2,400 km^{2}) is land and 10 square miles (26 km^{2}) (1.1%) is water. The northeastern half of the county is located on the western edge of the Red Bed Plains while the southwestern half lies in the Gypsum Hills. The North Canadian River runs through the county from northwest to southeast.

The county includes the largest lake in western Oklahoma, Canton Lake.

The county seat of Watonga hosts an annual cheese festival in October, celebrating the city's cheese factory.

=== Major highways ===
- U.S. Highway 270 / U.S. Highway 281
- State Highway 3
- State Highway 8
  - State Highway 8A
- State Highway 33
- State Highway 51
  - State Highway 51A
- State Highway 58
  - State Highway 58A

=== Adjacent counties ===
- Major County (north)
- Kingfisher County (east)
- Canadian County (southeast)
- Caddo County (south)
- Custer County (southwest)
- Dewey County (northwest)

== Demographics ==
Historical population
Census	Pop.	Note	%±
1900	10,658		—
1910	17,960		68.5%
1920	15,875		−11.6%
1930	20,452		28.8%
1940	18,543		−9.3%
1950	15,049		−18.8%
1960	12,077		−19.7%
1970	11,794		−2.3%
1980	13,443		14.0%
1990	11,470		−14.7%
2000	11,976		4.4%
2010	11,943		−0.3%
2020	8,735		−26.9%
2025 (est.)	8,515	▼	−2.5%
U.S. Decennial Census; 1790-1960 1900-1990; 1990-2000 2010-2019 2020

=== 2020 census ===
As of the 2020 United States census, the county had a population of 8,735. Of the residents, 25.0% were under the age of 18 and 20.8% were 65 years of age or older; the median age was 42.1 years. For every 100 females there were 99.6 males, and for every 100 females age 18 and over there were 94.9 males.

The racial makeup of the county was 74.0% White, 3.0% Black or African American, 7.7% American Indian and Alaska Native, 0.3% Asian, 4.5% from some other race, and 10.4% from two or more races. Hispanic or Latino residents of any race comprised 11.3% of the population.

There were 3,558 households in the county, of which 30.7% had children under the age of 18 living with them and 26.5% had a female householder with no spouse or partner present. About 30.9% of all households were made up of individuals and 16.4% had someone living alone who was 65 years of age or older.

There were 4,590 housing units, of which 22.5% were vacant. Among occupied housing units, 74.0% were owner-occupied and 26.0% were renter-occupied. The homeowner vacancy rate was 2.4% and the rental vacancy rate was 16.1%.

Between 2010 and 2020, the population of Blaine County declined by 26.9 percent to 8,735, the largest percentage decrease among Oklahoma counties during the decade. Although population decreases are typical of rural Oklahoma countries, much of Blaine County's drop was attributed to the 2010 closure of a prison that had been the county's largest employer.

=== 2000 census ===
As of the census of 2000, there were 11,976 people, 4,159 households, and 2,865 families residing in the county, nearly half of them located in the county seat of Watonga. The population density of the county was 13 people per square mile (5.0 people/km^{2}). There were 5,208 housing units at an average density of 6 units per square mile (2.3/km^{2}). The racial makeup of the county was 76.29% white, 8.70% Native American, 6.65% Black or African American, 0.71% Asian, 0.81% Pacific Islander, 2.86% from other races, and 3.97% from two or more races. Hispanic or Latino individuals of any race made up 6.62% of the population.

There were 4,159 households, out of which 30.80% had children under the age of 18 living with them. Slightly more than half (56.20%) were married couples living together, nearly a third (29%) were made up of individuals, 15.5% had someone living alone who was 65 years or older, and 8.6% were run by a female with no husband present. The average household size was 2.50, and the average family size was 3.08.

The county's median age in 2000 was 38 years, with almost a third (28.6%) of the population aged 25 to 44. Individuals under the age of 18 made up 24% of the population, individuals aged 45 to 64 made up 21.4% of the population, individuals aged 65 or older made up 16.8% of the population, and individuals between the ages of 18 and 24 made up 9.1% of the population. There were slightly more males than females, with 119.3 males for every 100 females and 125 adult males (18 or older) for every 100 female adults.

The county's median income for a household in 2000 was $28,356, and the median income for a family was $34,565. Males had a median income of $26,284 versus $18,619 for females. The county's per capita income was $13,546. About 12.8 percent of families and 16.9% of the population were below the poverty line, including 22.2% of those under age 18 and 13.2% of those age 65 or over.

== Politics ==
Voter Registration and Party Enrollment as of May 31, 2023
Party	Number of Voters	Percentage
Democratic	1,176	22.15%
Republican	3,390	63.85%
Others	743	14.00%
Total	5,309	100%

United States presidential election results for Blaine County, Oklahoma
Year	Republican		Democratic		Third party(ies)	
Year	No.	%	No.	%	No.	%
1908	1,598	48.84%	1,317	40.25%	357	10.91%
1912	831	42.66%	744	38.19%	373	19.15%
1916	1,339	40.97%	1,214	37.15%	715	21.88%
1920	2,786	61.64%	1,296	28.67%	438	9.69%
1924	2,255	48.53%	1,488	32.02%	904	19.45%
1928	3,413	67.83%	1,543	30.66%	76	1.51%
1932	1,728	26.80%	4,719	73.20%	0	0.00%
1936	2,877	39.98%	4,242	58.95%	77	1.07%
1940	4,080	56.54%	3,095	42.89%	41	0.57%
1944	3,480	62.24%	2,097	37.51%	14	0.25%
1948	2,835	52.21%	2,595	47.79%	0	0.00%
1952	4,851	72.65%	1,826	27.35%	0	0.00%
1956	3,855	67.64%	1,844	32.36%	0	0.00%
1960	3,646	67.88%	1,725	32.12%	0	0.00%
1964	2,741	53.48%	2,384	46.52%	0	0.00%
1968	3,036	60.08%	1,285	25.43%	732	14.49%
1972	3,958	77.73%	963	18.91%	171	3.36%
1976	2,682	53.05%	2,297	45.43%	77	1.52%
1980	3,708	70.44%	1,399	26.58%	157	2.98%
1984	4,037	72.69%	1,484	26.72%	33	0.59%
1988	2,889	61.03%	1,775	37.49%	70	1.48%
1992	2,209	43.73%	1,564	30.96%	1,279	25.32%
1996	2,127	46.88%	1,832	40.38%	578	12.74%
2000	2,633	64.31%	1,402	34.25%	59	1.44%
2004	3,199	72.36%	1,222	27.64%	0	0.00%
2008	3,101	75.41%	1,011	24.59%	0	0.00%
2012	2,824	74.00%	992	26.00%	0	0.00%
2016	2,884	76.03%	711	18.75%	198	5.22%
2020	3,136	80.39%	688	17.64%	77	1.97%
2024	3,054	80.67%	671	17.72%	61	1.61%

== Economy ==
Southard, located in central Blaine County, is the site of one of the purest gypsum deposits in the United States and is home to the U.S. Gypsum Company, the largest industrial plant in the county.

Lying in the Cimarron Valley, Okeene's economy has been based on agriculture, primarily wheat and hay. Major manufacturing businesses are the Okeene Milling Company, Seaboard Farms, and Mountain Country Foods, a manufacturer of pet food. The Okeene Municipal Hospital and Clinic is one of the primary medical centers of northwest Oklahoma.

== Communities ==
=== Cities ===
- Geary (partially in Canadian County)
- Watonga (county seat)

=== Towns ===
- Canton
- Greenfield
- Hitchcock
- Hydro (mostly in Caddo County)
- Longdale
- Okeene

=== Census-designated places ===
- Eagle City
- Homestead

=== Other unincorporated communities ===
- Bickford (ghost town)
- Bucher
- Darrow
- Southard

== Education ==
School districts include:

- Canton Public Schools
- Cimarron Public Schools
- Fairview Public Schools
- Geary Public Schools
- Hinton Public Schools
- Hydro-Eakly Public Schools
- Lomega Public Schools
- Okeene Public Schools
- Thomas-Fay-Custer Unified Schools
- Watonga Public Schools

== NRHP sites ==
The following sites in Blaine County are listed on the National Register of Historic Places:

- Acre Family Barn
- Blaine County Courthouse, Watonga
- Cantonment, Canton
- Jesse Chisholm Grave Site, Geary
- Cronkhite Ranch House, Watonga
- Thompson Benton Ferguson House, Watonga
- Gillespie Building, Geary
- Noble Hotel, Watonga
- Okeene Flour Mill, Okeene
- Old Plant Office Building, U.S. Gypsum Co., Southard
- Old Salt Works, Southard
- Public Water Trough, Geary
- Shinn Family Barn, Okeene
- Sooner Co-op Association Elevator (West), Okeene
- United States Post Office Watonga
- J. H. Wagner House, Watonga
- Watonga Armory, Watonga
