= Canton, Oklahoma =

Town in Oklahoma, US

- Town
- Logo
- Nickname: Bedrock
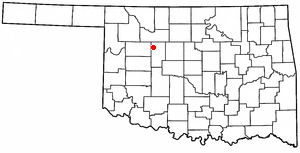
- Location of Canton, Oklahoma
- Coordinates: 36°03′18″N 98°35′18″W
- Country: United States
- State: Oklahoma
- County: Blaine

Area
  - Total: 0.53 sq mi (1.36 km^{2})
  - Land: 0.53 sq mi (1.36 km^{2})
  - Water: 0 sq mi (0.00 km^{2})
- Elevation: 1,588 ft (484 m)

Population (2020)
  - Total: 468
  - Density: 894.1/sq mi (345.23/km^{2})
- Time zone: UTC-6 (Central (CST))
  - Summer (DST): UTC-5 (CDT)
- ZIP code: 73724
- Area code: 580
- FIPS code: 40-11600
- GNIS feature ID: 2413160
- Website: www.townofcanton.com

Canton is a town in Blaine County, Oklahoma, United States. As of the 2020 census, Canton had a population of 468.

== Geography ==
According to the United States Census Bureau, the town has a total area of 0.5 square miles (1.3 km^{2}), all land.

== Demographics ==
Historical population
Census	Pop.	Note	%±
1910	703		—
1920	582		−17.2%
1930	797		36.9%
1940	775		−2.8%
1950	959		23.7%
1960	887		−7.5%
1970	844		−4.8%
1980	854		1.2%
1990	632		−26.0%
2000	618		−2.2%
2010	625		1.1%
2020	468		−25.1%
U.S. Decennial Census

=== 2020 census ===
As of the 2020 census, Canton had a population of 468. The median age was 42.0 years. 23.3% of residents were under the age of 18 and 24.6% of residents were 65 years of age or older. For every 100 females there were 100.0 males, and for every 100 females age 18 and over there were 95.1 males age 18 and over. 0.0% of residents lived in urban areas, while 100.0% lived in rural areas.

There were 200 households in Canton, of which 33.5% had children under the age of 18 living in them. Of all households, 42.0% were married-couple households, 25.0% were households with a male householder and no spouse or partner present, and 28.0% were households with a female householder and no spouse or partner present. About 30.5% of all households were made up of individuals and 22.5% had someone living alone who was 65 years of age or older.

There were 289 housing units, of which 30.8% were vacant. The homeowner vacancy rate was 0.7% and the rental vacancy rate was 24.7%.

Racial composition as of the 2020 census
Race	Number	Percent
White	349	74.6%
Black or African American	2	0.4%
American Indian and Alaska Native	57	12.2%
Asian	2	0.4%
Native Hawaiian and Other Pacific Islander	0	0.0%
Some other race	13	2.8%
Two or more races	45	9.6%
Hispanic or Latino (of any race)	45	9.6%

=== 2000 census ===
As of the census of 2000, there were 618 people, 268 households, and 165 families residing in the town. The population density was 1,186.3 inhabitants per square mile (458.0/km^{2}). There were 322 housing units at an average density of 618.1 per square mile (238.6/km^{2}). The racial makeup of the town was 83.66% White, 10.68% Native American, 3.40% from other races, and 2.27% from two or more races. Hispanic or Latino of any race were 4.53% of the population.

There were 268 households, out of which 31.0% had children under the age of 18 living with them, 51.1% were married couples living together, 7.8% had a female householder with no husband present, and 38.1% were non-families. 36.9% of all households were made up of individuals, and 22.4% had someone living alone who was 65 years of age or older. The average household size was 2.31 and the average family size was 3.02.

In the town, the population was spread out, with 26.9% under the age of 18, 8.1% from 18 to 24, 19.6% from 25 to 44, 26.1% from 45 to 64, and 19.4% who were 65 years of age or older. The median age was 41 years. For every 100 females, there were 85.0 males. For every 100 females age 18 and over, there were 82.3 males.

The median income for a household in the town was $23,250, and the median income for a family was $35,750. Males had a median income of $31,250 versus $20,179 for females. The per capita income for the town was $18,591. About 11.4% of families and 16.3% of the population were below the poverty line, including 28.0% of those under age 18 and 17.2% of those age 65 or over.
