= Watonga, Oklahoma =

City in Oklahoma, US

Watonga, Oklahoma Wo'teenko'oh (Arapaho) Tséhma'ėho'a'ē'ta (Cheyenne)
- City
- Seal
- Motto: "Strong and Resourceful"
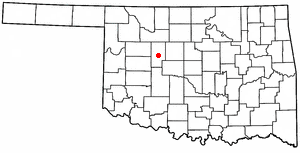
- Location of Watonga, Oklahoma
- Coordinates: 35°50′58″N 98°25′01″W
- Country: United States
- State: Oklahoma
- County: Blaine

Government
  - Type: Aldermanic

Area
  - Total: 3.78 sq mi (9.80 km^{2})
  - Land: 3.77 sq mi (9.76 km^{2})
  - Water: 0.015 sq mi (0.04 km^{2})
- Elevation: 1,522 ft (464 m)

Population (2020)
  - Total: 2,690
  - Density: 713.7/sq mi (275.57/km^{2})
- Time zone: UTC-6 (Central (CST))
  - Summer (DST): UTC-5 (CDT)
- ZIP code: 73772
- Area code: 580
- FIPS code: 40-78950
- GNIS feature ID: 2412193
- Website: www.watongaok.gov

Watonga is a city in Blaine County, Oklahoma. It is 70 miles northwest of Oklahoma City. The population was 2,690 as of the 2020 United States census. It is the county seat of Blaine County.

== History ==
Watonga is located on former Cheyenne and Arapaho Indian Reservation lands that were allotted to individual tribal members, and the excess opened to white settlers in the Land Run of 1892. Watonga is named after Arapaho Chief Wo'teenko'oh, whose name means "Black Coyote".

The town began as a tent city on April 19, 1892. A post office opened in Watonga during the same year. (Note: The first postmaster was Thompson Benton Ferguson, who served in this position until 1896. He then became the editor-publisher of the Watonga Republican newspaper until 1901, when President Theodore Roosevelt appointed him the sixth governor of Oklahoma Territory from 1906 through 1907. Ferguson then returned to his home in Watonga, where he lived for the rest of his life.) However, the first railroad line through Watonga was not built until 1901–02, when the Enid and Anadarko Railway (later the Chicago, Rock Island and Pacific Railway) constructed a 60 miles (97 km) rail line from Guthrie.

== Geography ==
According to the United States Census Bureau, the city has a total area of 4.1 square miles (10.6 km^{2}), of which 0.012 square miles (0.03 km^{2}), or 0.28%, is water.

== Demographics ==
Historical population
Census	Pop.	Note	%±
1910	842		—
1920	581		−31.0%
1930	1,038		78.7%
1940	2,828		172.4%
1950	3,249		14.9%
1960	3,252		0.1%
1970	3,696		13.7%
1980	4,139		12.0%
1990	3,408		−17.7%
2000	4,658		36.7%
2010	5,111		9.7%
2020	2,690		−47.4%
U.S. Decennial Census

=== 2020 census ===
As of the 2020 census, Watonga had a population of 2,690. The median age was 38.2 years. 28.1% of residents were under the age of 18 and 17.2% of residents were 65 years of age or older. For every 100 females there were 96.6 males, and for every 100 females age 18 and over there were 88.0 males age 18 and over.

0% of residents lived in urban areas, while 100.0% lived in rural areas.

There were 1,107 households in Watonga, of which 31.4% had children under the age of 18 living in them. Of all households, 38.4% were married-couple households, 21.9% were households with a male householder and no spouse or partner present, and 33.2% were households with a female householder and no spouse or partner present. About 35.0% of all households were made up of individuals and 17.3% had someone living alone who was 65 years of age or older.

There were 1,407 housing units, of which 21.3% were vacant. Among occupied housing units, 64.7% were owner-occupied and 35.3% were renter-occupied. The homeowner vacancy rate was 3.2% and the rental vacancy rate was 17.7%.

Racial composition as of the 2020 census
Race	Percent
White	59.0%
Black or African American	8.3%
American Indian and Alaska Native	9.9%
Asian	0.4%
Native Hawaiian and Other Pacific Islander	<0.1%
Some other race	7.8%
Two or more races	14.6%
Hispanic or Latino (of any race)	17.7%

=== 2000 census ===
As of the 2000 census, there were 4,658 people, 1,273 households, and 858 families residing in the city. The population density was 1,703.1 inhabitants per square mile (657.6/km^{2}). There were 1,507 housing units at an average density of 551.0 units per square mile (212.7 units/km^{2}). The racial makeup of the city was 61.19% White, 15.33% African American, 8.24% Native American, 1.55% Asian, 2.02% Pacific Islander, 4.89% from other races, and 6.78% from two or more races. Hispanic or Latino of any race were 11.91% of the population.

There were 1,273 households, out of which 33.9% had children under the age of 18 living with them, 51.3% were married couples living together, 11.5% had a female householder with no husband present, and 32.6% were non-families. 30.3% of all households were made up of individuals, and 17.0% had someone living alone who was 65 years of age or older. The average household size was 2.53 and the average family size was 3.16.

In the city, the population was spread out, with 20.5% under the age of 18, 12.5% from 18 to 24, 36.7% from 25 to 44, 17.9% from 45 to 64, and 12.4% who were 65 years of age or older. The median age was 34 years. For every 100 females, there were 169.4 males. For every 100 females age 18 and over, there were 191.1 males.

The median income for a household in the city was $27,208, and the median income for a family was $31,391. Males had a median income of $23,056 versus $16,146 for females. The per capita income for the city was $10,567. About 12.4% of families and 17.5% of the population were below the poverty line, including 24.1% of those under age 18 and 16.8% of those age 65 or over.

=== Population change ===
According to one report, Watonga's 42.9% reduction in population from 2010 to 2017 makes it the fastest shrinking place in Oklahoma. The population drop was mostly due to the closing of a prison which was the most important source of jobs for the city and the county.

== Economy ==
Since statehood, Watonga's economy has largely been based on agriculture. In the early days, local farmers primarily produced wheat. The dairy industry grew in western Oklahoma and led to the opening of the Watonga Cheese Factory in 1941. It was one of the state's five active dairy product plants in 2004. The plant subsequently closed in 2007.

Love's Travel Stops & Country Stores began with a single leased gas station in Watonga in the mid-1960s. Love's is now in 41 states, is approaching 500 travel centers, and employs 25,000 nationwide.

The city hosted the Diamondback Correctional Facility, owned by the Corrections Corporation of America from 1998, and the prison grew to become the town's largest employer. The prison, housing inmates from Arizona, experienced a riot in May 2004. The contract to utilize the facility was not renewed, resulting in the prison closing in May 2010. This left 300 prison workers jobless or transferred elsewhere. However, the prison owner – now named CoreCivic – announced in early October 2025 that it had entered into a 5-year (extendable) Intergovernmental Service Agreement among U.S. Immigration and Customs Enforcement (ICE) and the Oklahoma Department of Corrections to reopen the facility beginning in 2026 for ICE detainees.

The town's Walmart closed in 2016.

== Government ==
Watonga has an aldermanic form of government.

== Arts and culture ==
The city hosts an annual Watonga Cheese Festival in October. The festival was formed in 1976 by the Watonga Chamber of Commerce because the town had the only cheese factory in Oklahoma at the time. The festival continued even after the factory closed in 2007. In 2013, a wine competition was added to the festival.

The town newspaper, The Watonga Republican, has been published since 1892.

Watonga has the T.B. Ferguson Home Museum, which consists of the 1901 Victorian-style house of publisher T.B. Ferguson and various artifacts of the era.

== Notable people ==
- Sis Cunningham, musician known for folk and protest music
- Thompson Benton Ferguson, newspaper publisher and eighth governor of the Oklahoma Territory
- Trevon Hartfield, NFL safety
- Robert J. Helberg, aeronautical engineer for NASA who contributed to the Lunar Orbiter program
- Byron Houston, retired NBA player
- Guy Lookabaugh, coach and former player of multiple sports
- Jim Lookabaugh, football player and coach
- Clarence Nash (1904–1985), the original voice of Donald Duck.
- Patrick Sherrill, perpetrator of the Edmond post office shooting

== Parks and recreation ==
Roman Nose State Park, which opened in 1937 and was one of the state's seven original state parks, is seven miles north of Watonga, off State Highway 8 and 8a. It includes two lakes, the smaller being Lake Boecher, and the larger the 55-surface-acre Lake Watonga. The park includes hiking trails, guided horseback rides and hayrides to a historic natural-rock swimming pool, miniature golf, and an 18-hole par-70 golf course. For lodging, the park has Roman Nose Lodge, built in 1956 and renovated in 2010, along with more than 90 campsites, almost equally split between RV and tent sites.

== Historic sites ==
Ferguson Chapel was a Presbyterian Church dedicated in 1903 and continued in use until 1972. In 1992, the building was restored by town volunteers and is used as an event center.

Seven of 17 NHRP-listed sites in Blaine County are located in Watonga, including the Blaine County Courthouse, the Noble Hotel, and the United States Post Office Watonga.

== Transportation ==
Watonga connects with U.S. Route 270, State Highway 3, State Highway 8, and State Highway 51a.

Watonga is served by Watonga Regional Airport.

Commercial air transportation is available at Will Rogers World Airport, about 68 miles to the southeast.

Rail freight carriage of grain, fertilizer, and other agriculture-related products is provided by AT&L Railroad, which runs from Watonga to Geary to El Reno, Oklahoma, with overhead trackage rights on the Union Pacific from El Reno to Oklahoma City.
