= Nescatunga, Oklahoma =

Unincorporated community in Oklahoma, US

- Census-designated place
- Location within Oklahoma
- Coordinates: 36°45′15″N 98°09′22″W
- Country: United States
- State: Oklahoma
- County: Alfalfa

Area
  - Total: 0.22 sq mi (0.58 km^{2})
  - Land: 0.22 sq mi (0.58 km^{2})
  - Water: 0 sq mi (0.00 km^{2})
- Elevation: 1,145 ft (349 m)

Population (2020)
  - Total: 90
  - Density: 400/sq mi (154/km^{2})
- Time zone: UTC-6 (Central (CST))
  - Summer (DST): UTC-5 (CDT)
- FIPS code: 40-50975
- GNIS feature ID: 2629933

Nescatunga is an unincorporated census-designated place (CDP) in Alfalfa County, Oklahoma, United States adjacent to Great Salt Plains State Park. The population was 90 at the time of the 2020 Census, up from the population of 70 reported in the 2010 census.

== History ==
Sans Orielle, an Osage Indian, along with other members of his tribe guided Indian Agent Major George C. Sibley and his party from Fort Osage, Missouri, to the Great Salt Plains area of present-day Alfalfa county in 1811. The Sibley party members are believed to have been the first white men to set sight on the salt plains, which Sibley called the Grand Saline. The Salt Fork of the Arkansas River, flowing through the plains, was known by the Osages as Nescatunga - meaning 'big salt water'.

Nescatunga is adjacent to the Great Salt Plains Reservoir located on the Salt Fork of the Arkansas River. The creation of the dam and reservoir was a U.S. Army Corps of Engineers’ project in the late 1930s and early 1940s. It was completed in July, 1941 at a cost of $4.6 million.

== Geography ==
Nescatunga is located in eastern Alfalfa County. It is near the outlet of the Great Salt Plains Lake on the Salt Fork of the Arkansas River and is adjacent to Great Salt Plains State Park. Oklahoma State Highway 38 runs through the center of the community, leading south 10 miles (16 km) to Jet, the nearest incorporated town.

Nescatunga's Census Bureau CDP has a total area of 0.23 square miles (0.6 km^{2}), all of it land.

== Demographics ==
Historical population
Census	Pop.	Note	%±
2010	70		—
2020	90		28.6%
U.S. Decennial Census

=== 2020 census ===
As of the 2020 census, Nescatunga had a population of 90. The median age was 46.5 years. 20.0% of residents were under the age of 18 and 24.4% of residents were 65 years of age or older. For every 100 females there were 109.3 males, and for every 100 females age 18 and over there were 111.8 males age 18 and over.

0.0% of residents lived in urban areas, while 100.0% lived in rural areas.

There were 43 households in Nescatunga, of which 23.3% had children under the age of 18 living in them. Of all households, 55.8% were married-couple households, 23.3% were households with a male householder and no spouse or partner present, and 20.9% were households with a female householder and no spouse or partner present. About 37.3% of all households were made up of individuals and 32.6% had someone living alone who was 65 years of age or older.

There were 84 housing units, of which 48.8% were vacant. The homeowner vacancy rate was 0.0% and the rental vacancy rate was 0.0%.

Racial composition as of the 2020 census
Race	Number	Percent
White	86	95.6%
Black or African American	0	0.0%
American Indian and Alaska Native	2	2.2%
Asian	0	0.0%
Native Hawaiian and Other Pacific Islander	0	0.0%
Some other race	0	0.0%
Two or more races	2	2.2%
Hispanic or Latino (of any race)	1	1.1%

== See also ==
- Great Salt Plains State Park and National Wildlife Refuge
- Great Salt Plains
