= Oklahoma State Highway 38 =

State highway in Oklahoma, United States

State Highway 38

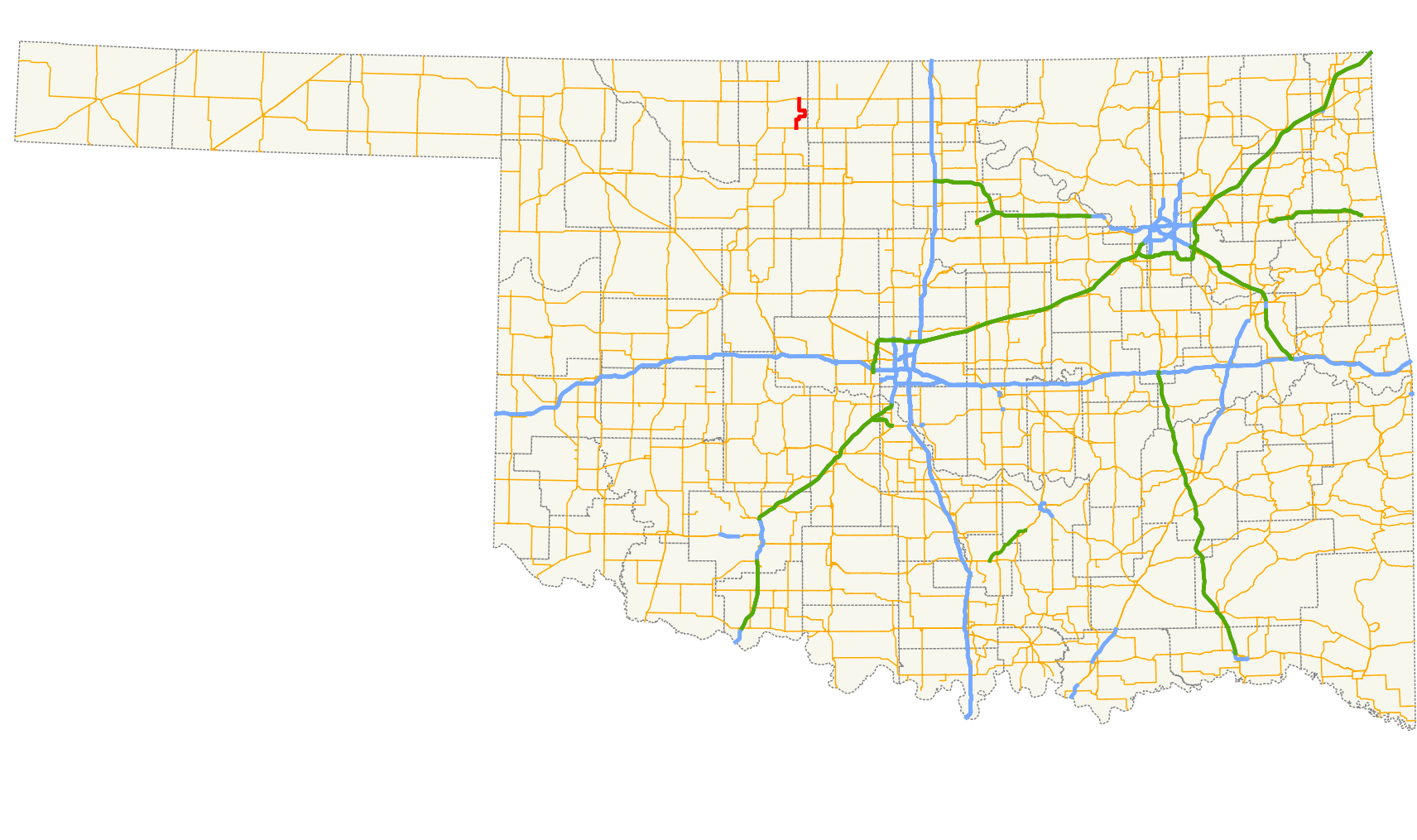

Route information
- Maintained by ODOT
- Length: 14.76 mi (23.75 km)
- Existed: c. 1961–present

Major junctions
- South end: US 64 in Jet
- North end: SH-11 west of Medford

Location
- Country: United States
- State: Oklahoma

Highway system
- Oklahoma State Highway System; Interstate; US; State; Turnpikes
← SH-37	→ SH-39

State Highway 38 (abbreviated SH-38) is a state highway in the U.S. state of Oklahoma. It runs for 14.78 miles (23.79 km) in an irregular south-to-north pattern in eastern Alfalfa County, in the northwest part of the state. The highway begins at U.S. Route 64 (US-64) in Jet and extends to SH-11. SH-38 provides access to Great Salt Plains State Park, which the road skirts on the park's eastern edge.

The road that is now SH-38 was added to the state highway system as SH-35 c. 1961. The highway was renumbered to SH-38 the following year.

== Route description ==
State Highway 38 begins at an intersection with U.S. Highway 64 in downtown Jet. The road heads northward along a section line for approximately 3 miles (4.8 km). The highway then makes a sharp turn to the east along another section line to avoid the Great Salt Plains Lake. The highway only heads east for about one mile (1.6 km) before turning back to the north; one mile further north, the highway makes a turn to the east, again avoiding the lake.

After traveling east for two miles (3.2 km), SH-38 is forced to turn back to the north by Kegelman Air Force Auxiliary Field, a secondary airfield of Vance Air Force Base. As the highway continues north, it forms the boundary between Kegelman AFAF to the east and the Great Salt Plains State Park to the west. Upon crossing the Salt Fork Arkansas River, the road turns back to the west, entering the park. Within the park boundaries, SH-38 is again forced to change course by the Great Salt Plains Lake, and turns back to a due north heading. One mile (1.6 km) north of the turn, the highway passes through the unincorporated place of Vining. SH-38 continues north, coming to an end at SH-11.

== History ==
The SH-38 designation was originally given to an alignment from SH-58 in Carrier south to US-60 and SH-15 (now US-412). The majority of this route had been reassigned to SH-45, with the remainder being added to SH-132, by 1963.

The road that is now SH-38 was added to the state highway system in late 1961 to early 1962 as SH-35. When the SH-38 designation was freed up in 1962, SH-35 was renumbered to SH-38. No further changes to the route have occurred since then.

== Major intersections ==
The entire route is in Alfalfa County.

Location	mi	km	Destinations	Notes
Jet	0.00	0.00	US 64	Southern terminus
	14.76	23.75	SH-11	Northern terminus
1.000 mi = 1.609 km; 1.000 km = 0.621 mi
