= Central Great Plains (ecoregion) =

Temperate grasslands, savannas, and shrublands ecoregion of the United States

Coordinates: 38°N 98°W

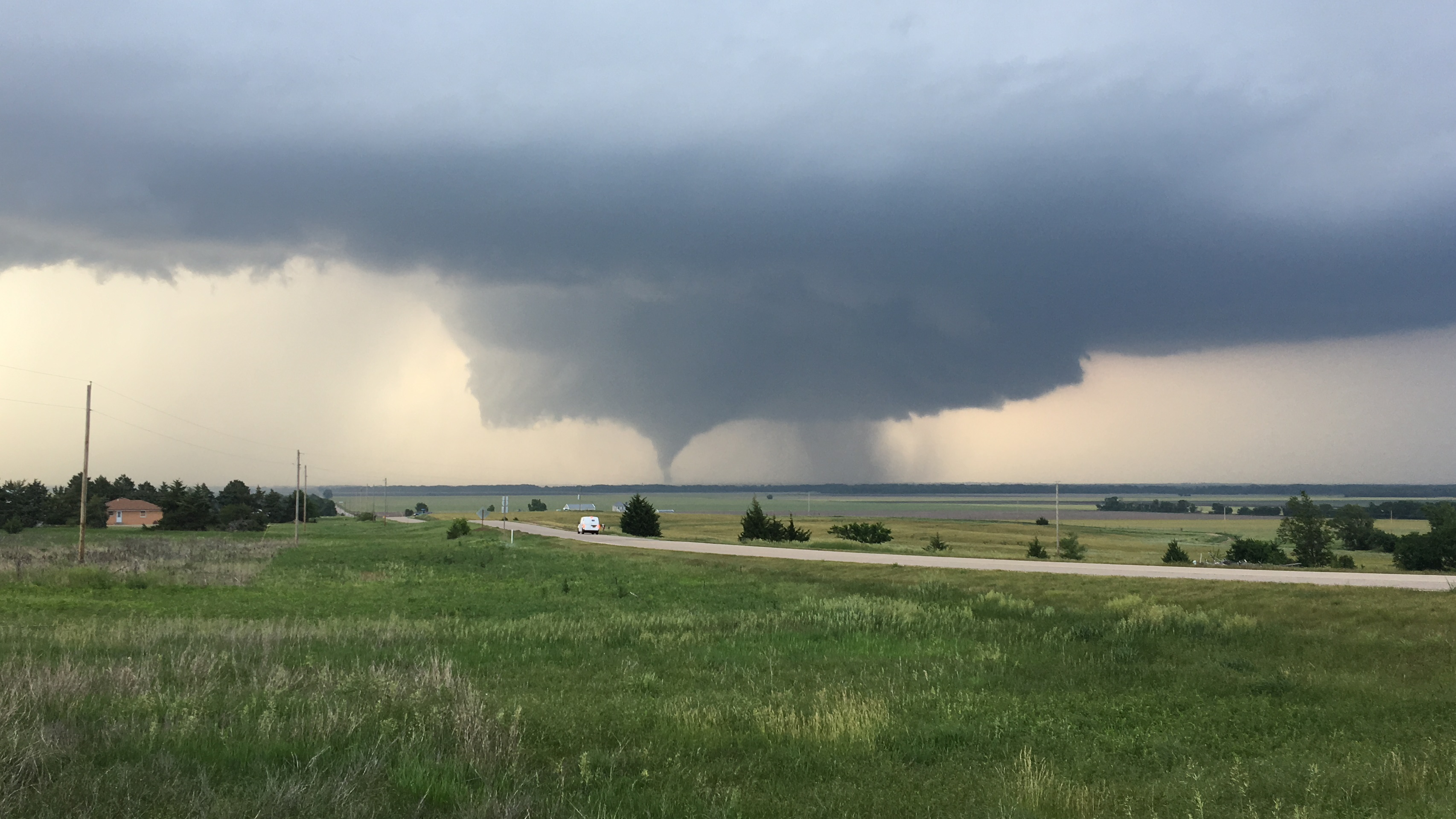
- Tornado north of Solomon, Kansas in 2016

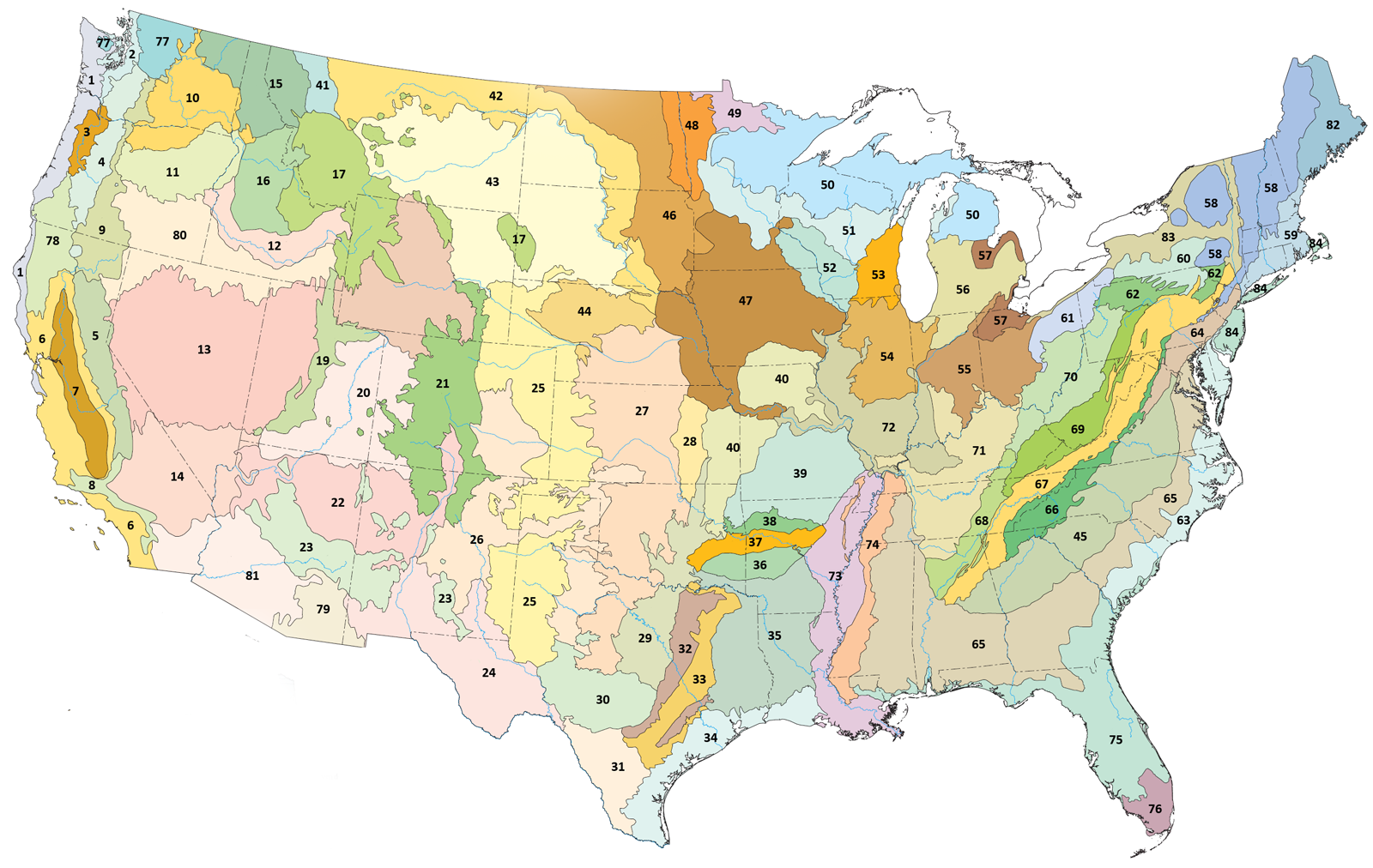
- Central Great Plains (area 27 on the map)

Ecology
- Realm: Nearctic
- Biome: Temperate grasslands, savannas, and shrublands
- Borders: List: Western High Plains to the northwest; Southwestern Tablelands to the southwest; Southern Rockies to the northwest; Edwards Plateau to the south; Central Oklahoma/Texas Plains to the southeast; Flint Hills to the central-northeast; Western Corn Belt Plains to the northeast; Nebraska Sand Hills to the north
- Bird species: 228
- Mammal species: 88

Geography
- Country: United States
- State: Texas, Oklahoma, Kansas, Nebraska
- Climate type: Humid continental (Dfa) and humid subtropical (Cfa)

Conservation
- Habitat loss: 50.68%
- Protected: 0.48%

Designated as Central and Southern Mixed Grasslands by the World Wildlife Fund

The Central Great Plains are a prairie ecoregion of the central United States, part of North American Great Plains. The region runs from west-central Texas through west-central Oklahoma, central Kansas, and south-central Nebraska.

It is designated as the Central and Southern Mixed Grasslands ecoregion by the World Wide Fund for Nature.

== Geography ==
This large grassland area with very few trees runs north–south from central Nebraska through central Kansas and western Oklahoma to north-central Texas, covering 109,000 mi^{2} (282,000 km^{2}). It is a transition zone between the Central tall grasslands and Central forest-grasslands transition ecoregions to the east and the Western short grasslands to the west, while to the north lie the Northern mixed grasslands, which have a cooler temperature and a much shorter growing season. The Edwards Plateau Savannas lie to the south.

== Environment ==
=== Flora ===
The predominant vegetation of the Central Great Plains ecoregion is a rich mixture of prairie Central and Southern mixed grasslands of medium height. The ecoregion is encompassed by the tallgrass and shortgrass prairies — this region has a mix of both tallgrass and shortgrass. Wildflowers occur among the grasses, but very few trees and shrubs do. The grasslands are heavily grazed and frequently disturbed by drought and fire. Other vegetation is drought-tolerant species honey mesquite and prickly pear cacti.

=== Fauna ===
The Central Great Plains prairie is part of the historical native rangeland of the Great Plains endemic American bison. It has been converted for use as grazing land for cattle since the 19th century.

The grasslands are home habitat for resident prairie birds, while the wetlands of the region are important stopovers for birds migrating between North America and Mexico. The Cheyenne Bottoms near Great Bend, Kansas, and the Platte River in Nebraska are particularly important for migrating sandhill cranes and other waders.

The region is home to a large number of reptiles. Some of the prevalent wildlife in the southern area are coyotes, striped bark scorpions, prairie rattlesnake (Crotalus viridis), and Great Plains skink (Plestiodon obsoletus).

=== Conservation ===
Most of the grasslands have been converted for agriculture, with only about 5% of natural habitat remaining. Indeed, this area was so heavily overcultivated that it was damaged during the 1930s Dust Bowl period in which the topsoil was blown away in dust storms. The grasslands have since recovered, but are cropland and managed grazing ranges rather than unspoiled native grasses and perennials pasture.

==== Protected areas ====
The small remaining blocks of intact habitat include:

- Oklahoma — the Wichita Mountains, and the Great Salt Plains Lake in Salt Plains National Wildlife Refuge
- Nebraska — the Platte River State Park near Louisville, Nebraska, and the Rainwater Basins to the south
- Kansas — the Cheyenne Bottoms, the Quivira National Wildlife Refuge near the town of Stafford, the Red Hills, and the Smoky Hills areas

These protected areas consist of patches of intact native grassland amid cultivated rangeland, and most of the remaining natural habitats of the Great Plains are unprotected. The two largest protected areas are the Wichita Mountains Wildlife Refuge for bison and black-capped vireo, and the Salt Plains National Wildlife Refuge.

== See also ==
- The Great Plains Ecoregion
- Flora of the Great Plains (North America)
- Great Plains—related topics
- Temperate grasslands, savannas, and shrublands in the United States — biome's ecoregions in the U.S.
- List of ecoregions in the United States (EPA)
- List of ecoregions in the United States (WWF) — Region 109 on the map
