= Kegelman Air Force Auxiliary Field =

- Near Cherokee, Oklahoma in the United States
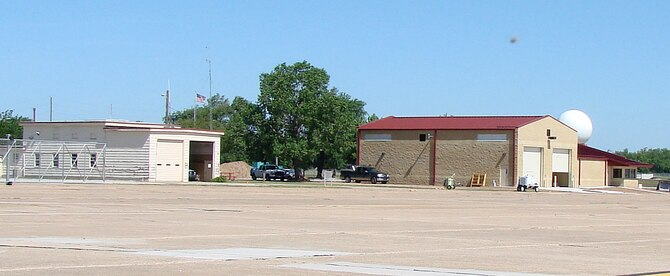
- The fire station at Kegelman Auxiliary Field during 2009.

Site information
- Type: US Air Force auxiliary airfield
- Owner: Department of Defense
- Operator: US Air Force
- Controlled by: Air Education and Training Command
- Condition: Operational

Location
- Location in the United States
- Coordinates: 36°44′17″N 098°07′34″W

Garrison information
- Garrison: Parented by the 71st Flying Training Wing

Airfield information
- Identifiers: IATA: CKA, ICAO: KCKA, FAA LID: CKA
- Elevation: 367 metres (1,204 ft) AMSL
Runways
Direction	Length and surface
17/35	2,377 metres (7,799 ft)
- Source: AirNav.com

Kegelman Air Force Auxiliary Field (IATA: CKA, ICAO: KCKA, FAA LID: CKA) is located near the Salt Plains National Wildlife Refuge in Alfalfa County, Oklahoma, across the Great Salt Plains Lake, 20 km (12 mi) east of Cherokee, Oklahoma in the United States.

The field has one runway, a fire station, personnel offices and a NEXRAD tower, which is used for weather forecasting for both the military and civilian entities. It is located on 1,066 acres (4.31 km^{2}).

Currently, Kegelman AFAF is a sub-base of Vance Air Force Base under the control of the 71st Flying Training Wing (71 FTW). The airfield was previously administered by Will Rogers Field, Clovis Army Air Field, Woodward Army Air Field, and Liberal Army Airfield prior to the U.S. Air Force becoming an independent service in 1947.

Vance AFB student pilots and instructor pilots use the airfield to practice landings in T-6A Texan II aircraft, and refer to the field with the callsign "Dogface".

The installation was first known as the Great Salt Plains Auxiliary Field, but was renamed Kegelman in 1949. It was named in honor of famed USAAF pilot Colonel Charles Clark "Sonny" Kegelman, a native of El Reno, Oklahoma and 1932 graduate of El Reno High School, who led the first joint-Allied raid of the Eighth Air Force against Nazi targets in Europe in World War 2 on 4 July 1942.
