= Cheyenne Township, Barton County, Kansas =

Cheyenne Township
- Township
- Location in Barton County
- Coordinates: 38°31′21″N 098°38′46″W
- Country: United States
- State: Kansas
- County: Barton

Area
  - Total: 72.24 sq mi (187.11 km^{2})
  - Land: 67.3 sq mi (174.4 km^{2})
  - Water: 4.91 sq mi (12.72 km^{2}) 6.8%
- Elevation: 1,801 ft (549 m)

Population (2010)
  - Total: 207
  - Density: 3.07/sq mi (1.19/km^{2})
- GNIS feature ID: 0475521

Cheyenne Township is a township in Barton County, Kansas, United States. As of the 2010 census, its population was 207.

== History ==
Cheyenne Township was organized in 1878.

== Geography ==
Viewing geographic center of Kansas from the northeast on NE 50 Rd in Cheyenne Township of Barton County

Cheyenne Township covers an area of 72.25 square miles (187.1 km^{2}) and contains no incorporated settlements. The unincorporated community of Redwing lies in the center of the township. According to the USGS, it contains one cemetery, Holy Family.

The Cheyenne Bottoms Wildlife Area is located almost exclusively in Cheyenne Township; it occupies most of the southern half of the township. Blood Creek runs through some of the township's southern part, emptying into the lake at the center of Cheyenne Bottoms.

Two oil fields are located in Cheyenne Township: one in the northeast, and one in the west.
