= Redwing, Kansas =

Unincorporated community in Barton County, Kansas

- Unincorporated community
- Redwing on K-4 facing west

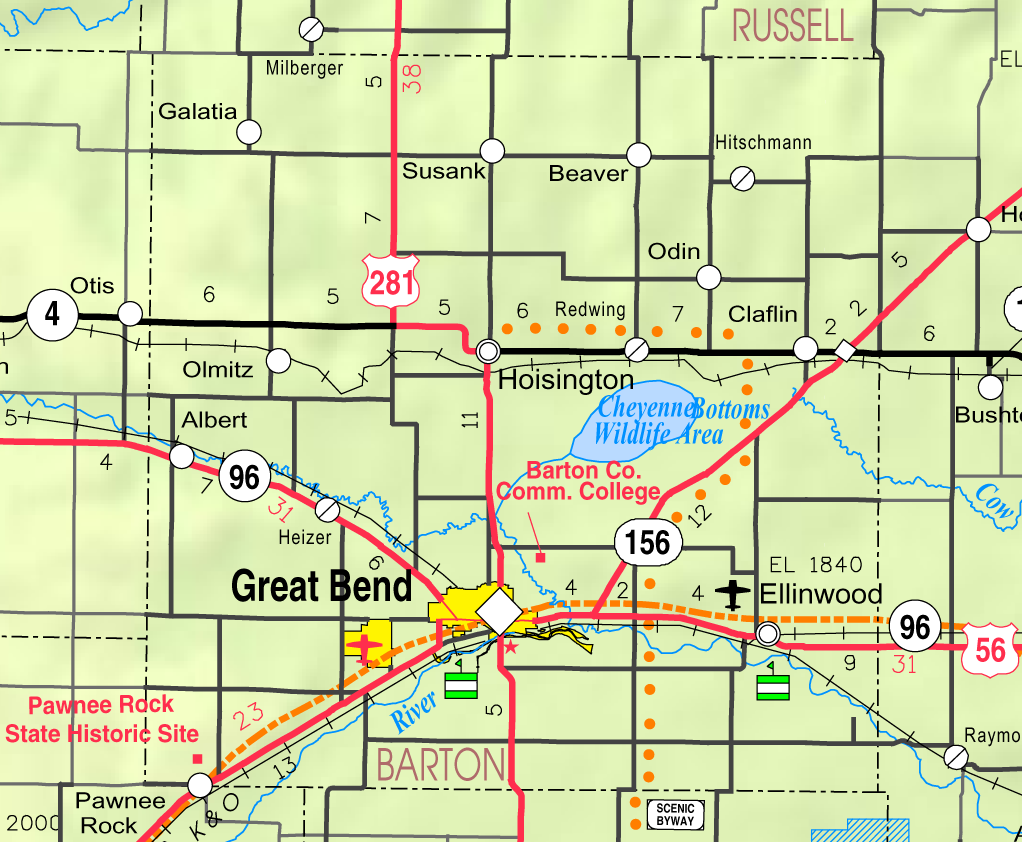
- KDOT map of Barton County (legend)

- Location within Kansas Location within the United States
- Coordinates: 38°31′19″N 98°39′52″W
- Country: United States
- State: Kansas
- County: Barton
- Elevation: 1,811 ft (552 m)
- Time zone: UTC-6 (CST)
  - Summer (DST): UTC-5 (CDT)
- Area code: 620
- FIPS code: 20-58775
- GNIS ID: 475519

Redwing (or Red Wing) is an unincorporated community in Cheyenne Township, Barton County, Kansas, United States. It is located 1.5 miles (2.4 km) northwest of the northern edge of the Cheyenne Bottoms Wildlife Area, 6.0 miles (9.7 km) east of the city of Hoisington, and 7.0 miles (11.3 km) west of the city of Claflin.

== History ==
A post office operated in Redwing from 1892 to 1955. There was a grain elevator and tavern in years past.
