= Jet, Oklahoma =

Town in Oklahoma, US

- Town
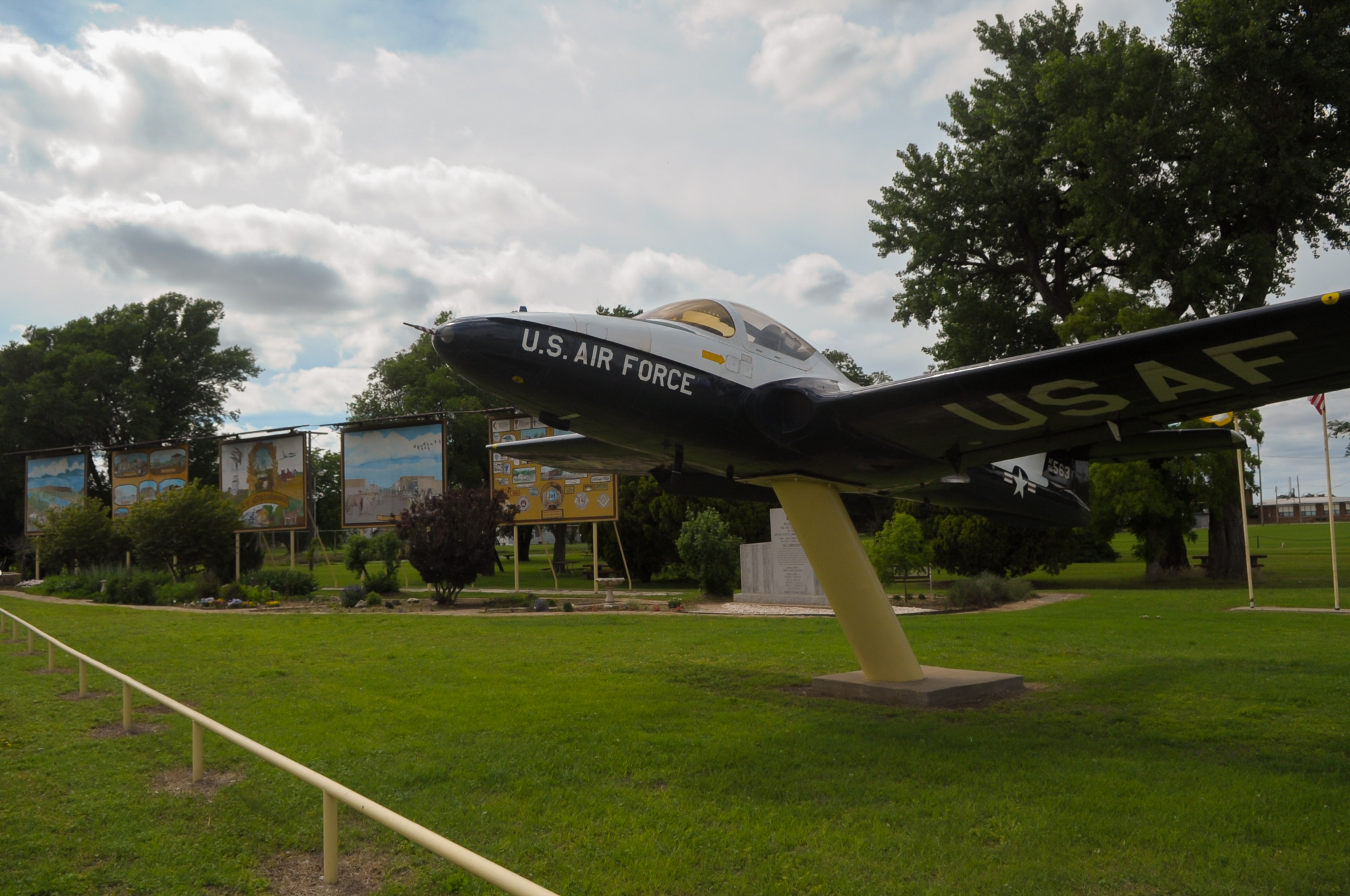
- Cessna T-37B Tweet (serial # 56-3563) on display at the Jet Lions Memorial Park.

- Logo
- Motto: Goose Hunting Capital of Oklahoma
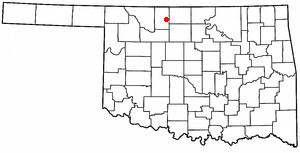
- Location of Jet, Oklahoma
- Coordinates: 36°40′00″N 98°10′54″W
- Country: United States
- State: Oklahoma
- County: Alfalfa

Area
  - Total: 0.27 sq mi (0.70 km^{2})
  - Land: 0.27 sq mi (0.70 km^{2})
  - Water: 0 sq mi (0.00 km^{2})
- Elevation: 1,243 ft (379 m)

Population (2020)
  - Total: 197
  - Density: 725.0/sq mi (279.91/km^{2})
- Time zone: UTC-6 (Central (CST))
  - Summer (DST): UTC-5 (CDT)
- ZIP code: 73749
- Area code: 580
- FIPS code: 40-38000
- GNIS feature ID: 2412805

Jet is a town in southeast Alfalfa County, Oklahoma, United States. The population was 197 at the time of the 2020 Census.

== History ==
The community of Jet was founded by the Jett brothers, six unmarried brothers named Joseph, Trigg, Newt, Warner, John, and Richard Jett, who established homesteads in the former Cherokee Outlet, shortly after its opening to settlement by non-Indians. The brothers erected buildings and opened a general store on Richard's land. The Jet post office was established in 1894, when it was moved from nearby Barrel Springs which was about 1.5 miles northeast. Warner Jett was the first postmaster. The community grew into a small town, and Jet incorporated in 1900.

The Frisco Townsite Company, owned by the Denver, Enid and Gulf Railroad (DE&G) (acquired by the Atchison, Topeka and Santa Fe Railway in 1907), surveyed a plot of land about 2 miles (3.2 km) west of the original town and relocated Jet during 1905-1906. By August 1907, the town had Baptist, Mennonite, Methodist, and Presbyterian churches in addition to seven general stores, two banks, two hotels, two grain elevators, plus a small school under construction. At the time of statehood in 1907, Jet had a population of 213 people.

== Geography ==
Jet is 12 miles (19 km) east-southeast of the county seat, Cherokee.

Jet is located at the intersection of U.S. Highway 64 and State Highway 38. This intersection is the southern terminus of SH-38.

According to the United States Census Bureau, the town has a total area of 0.3 square miles (0.78 km^{2}), all land.

=== Climate ===
Climate data for Jet, Oklahoma
Month	Jan	Feb	Mar	Apr	May	Jun	Jul	Aug	Sep	Oct	Nov	Dec	Year
Mean daily maximum °F (°C)	43.8 (6.6)	49.8 (9.9)	59.9 (15.5)	70.7 (21.5)	79.5 (26.4)	89.5 (31.9)	95.9 (35.5)	93.8 (34.3)	84.3 (29.1)	73.6 (23.1)	58.4 (14.7)	46.9 (8.3)	70.5 (21.4)
Mean daily minimum °F (°C)	20.1 (−6.6)	25.2 (−3.8)	34.1 (1.2)	46.1 (7.8)	56.0 (13.3)	65.0 (18.3)	70.0 (21.1)	67.9 (19.9)	59.9 (15.5)	47.4 (8.6)	35.0 (1.7)	24.4 (−4.2)	45.9 (7.7)
Average precipitation inches (mm)	0.7 (18)	1.0 (25)	2.4 (61)	2.7 (69)	3.9 (99)	3.5 (89)	2.7 (69)	3.3 (84)	3.3 (84)	2.1 (53)	1.8 (46)	0.8 (20)	28.1 (710)
Source 1: weather.com
Source 2: Weatherbase.com

== Demographics ==
Historical population
Census	Pop.	Note	%±
1910	365		—
1920	370		1.4%
1930	389		5.1%
1940	442		13.6%
1950	371		−16.1%
1960	339		−8.6%
1970	317		−6.5%
1980	352		11.0%
1990	272		−22.7%
2000	230		−15.4%
2010	213		−7.4%
2020	197		−7.5%
U.S. Decennial Census

=== 2020 census ===
As of the 2020 census, Jet had a population of 197. The median age was 41.2 years. 28.4% of residents were under the age of 18 and 19.3% of residents were 65 years of age or older. For every 100 females there were 85.8 males, and for every 100 females age 18 and over there were 85.5 males age 18 and over.

0.0% of residents lived in urban areas, while 100.0% lived in rural areas.

There were 92 households in Jet, of which 48.9% had children under the age of 18 living in them. Of all households, 53.3% were married-couple households, 17.4% were households with a male householder and no spouse or partner present, and 29.3% were households with a female householder and no spouse or partner present. About 27.2% of all households were made up of individuals and 16.3% had someone living alone who was 65 years of age or older.

There were 119 housing units, of which 22.7% were vacant. The homeowner vacancy rate was 0.0% and the rental vacancy rate was 0.0%.

Racial composition as of the 2020 census
Race	Number	Percent
White	180	91.4%
Black or African American	1	0.5%
American Indian and Alaska Native	0	0.0%
Asian	0	0.0%
Native Hawaiian and Other Pacific Islander	0	0.0%
Some other race	1	0.5%
Two or more races	15	7.6%
Hispanic or Latino (of any race)	5	2.5%

=== 2000 census ===
As of the census of 2000, there were 230 people, 115 households, and 71 families residing in the town. The population density was 746.3 inhabitants per square mile (288.1/km^{2}). There were 149 housing units at an average density of 483.5 per square mile (186.7/km^{2}). The racial makeup of the town was 96.09% White, 1.30% Native American, 0.43% Asian, and 2.17% from two or more races. Hispanic or Latino of any race were 0.43% of the population.

There were 115 households, out of which 18.3% had children under the age of 18 living with them, 55.7% were married couples living together, 4.3% had a female householder with no husband present, and 37.4% were non-families. 35.7% of all households were made up of individuals, and 24.3% had someone living alone who was 65 years of age or older. The average household size was 2.00 and the average family size was 2.57.

In the town, the population was spread out, with 16.5% under the age of 18, 3.0% from 18 to 24, 24.3% from 25 to 44, 26.1% from 45 to 64, and 30.0% who were 65 years of age or older. The median age was 50 years. For every 100 females, there were 96.6 males. For every 100 females age 18 and over, there were 95.9 males.

The median income for a household in the town was $28,393, and the median income for a family was $31,250. Males had a median income of $25,000 versus $18,250 for females. The per capita income for the town was $15,024. About 2.7% of families and 5.3% of the population were below the poverty line, including none of those under the age of 18 and 9.0% of those 65 or over.

== Economy ==
Jet's economy has been based on farming since its inception. The main products are wheat, livestock, and poultry.

Tourism has bolstered the economy since the Great Salt Plains National Wildlife Refuge was established in 1930. Jet is also the closest town to Great Salt Plains Lake and Great Salt Plains State Park just to the northwest.

== Education ==
Jet-Nash High School served Jet up until 2013, when the school folded due to a lack of sufficient funds. Jet is currently a part of Timberlake Regional School District, which also serves the towns of Nash, Nescatunga, Goltry, and Helena. The elementary school is located in Jet in the building that used to be Jet-Nash High School, and the high school, Timberlake High School, is located in Helena, about 13 miles south of Jet.
