= Southwestern Tablelands =

Ecoregion in the United States

Coordinates: 32°N 96°W

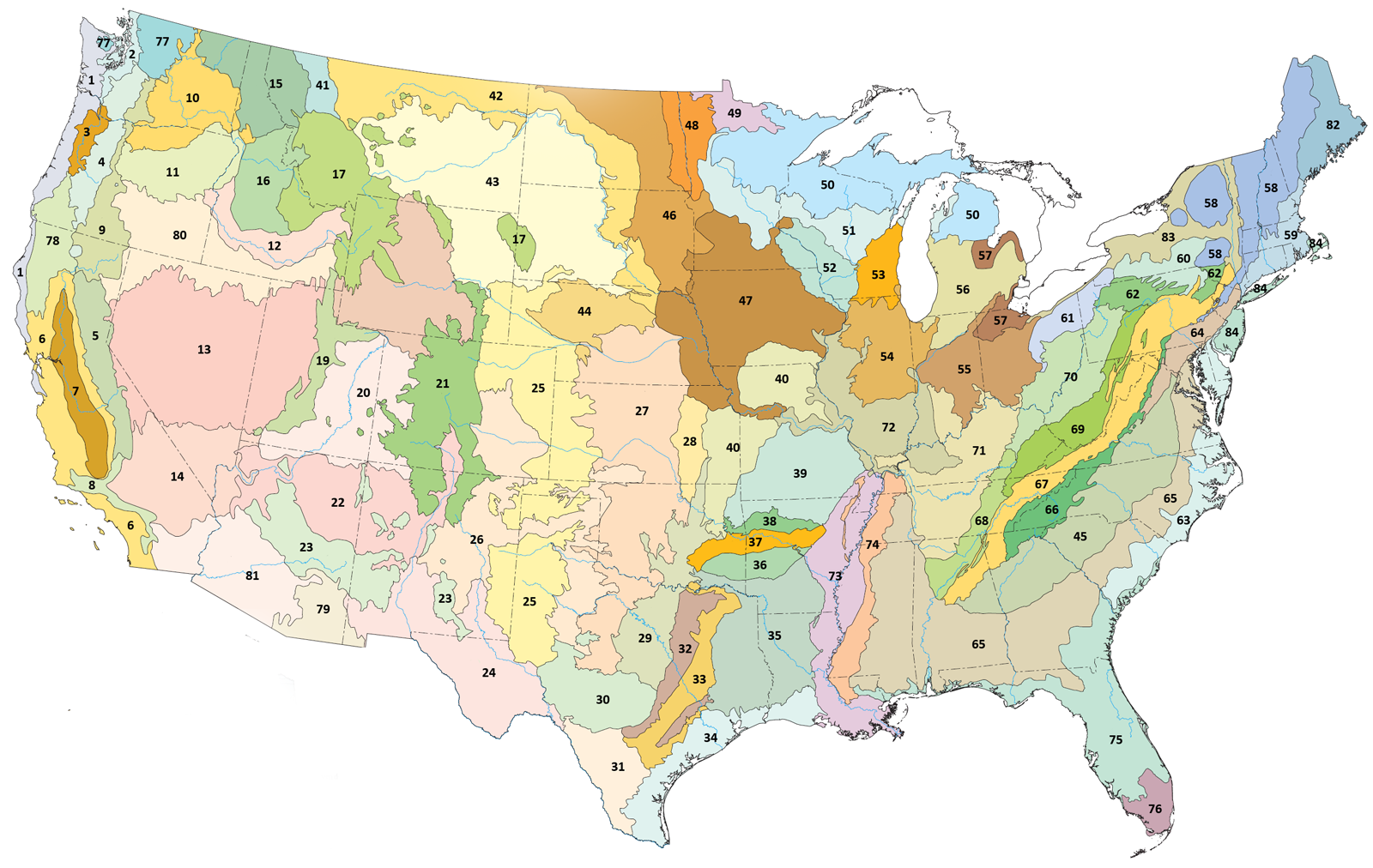
- Central Great Plains (area 26 on the map)

Ecology
- Realm: Nearctic
- Borders: List: Western High Plains to the north and south of the Southwestern Tablelands corridor; Central Great Plains to the east; Southern Rockies to the northwest; Arizona/New Mexico Plateau a very small portion to the central west; Arizona/New Mexico Mountains and Chihuahuan Desert to the south-southwest; Edwards Plateau to the southeast; Central Great Plains to the east
- Bird species
- Mammal species

Geography
- Country: United States
- State: Colorado, Kansas, New Mexico, Oklahoma, Texas
- Climate type: Cold semi-arid

The southwestern tablelands comprise an ecoregion running from east-central to south-east Colorado, east-central and a small portion of eastern New Mexico, some eastern portions of the Oklahoma Panhandle, far south-central Kansas, and portions of northwest Texas. This ecoregion has a "cold semiarid" climate (Köppen BSk). Some years, a National Weather Service dust storm warning is issued in parts of Texas due to a dust storm originating from the lower part of the Southwestern Tablelands ecological region or from the southern end of the Western High Plains ecological region.

== Included cities ==
- The Canadian River, north of Amarillo, Texas, is the central corridor of the Southwestern Tablelands.
- Snyder, Texas
- La Junta, Colorado
- Colorado Springs, Colorado
- The western edge is near Pueblo, Colorado, and Albuquerque, New Mexico
- The northern edge is south of Dodge City, Kansas
- The eastern edge is west of Woodward, Oklahoma

== Environment ==
Flora

In the northwestern region, the prevalent vegetation consists of grasses of the shortgrass prairie ecosystem and sagebrush.

Fauna

== See also ==
- List of ecoregions in the United States (EPA)
- List of ecoregions in the United States (WWF)
