= Salt Plains National Wildlife Refuge =

Protected natural area in Oklahoma

- IUCN category IV (habitat/species management area)
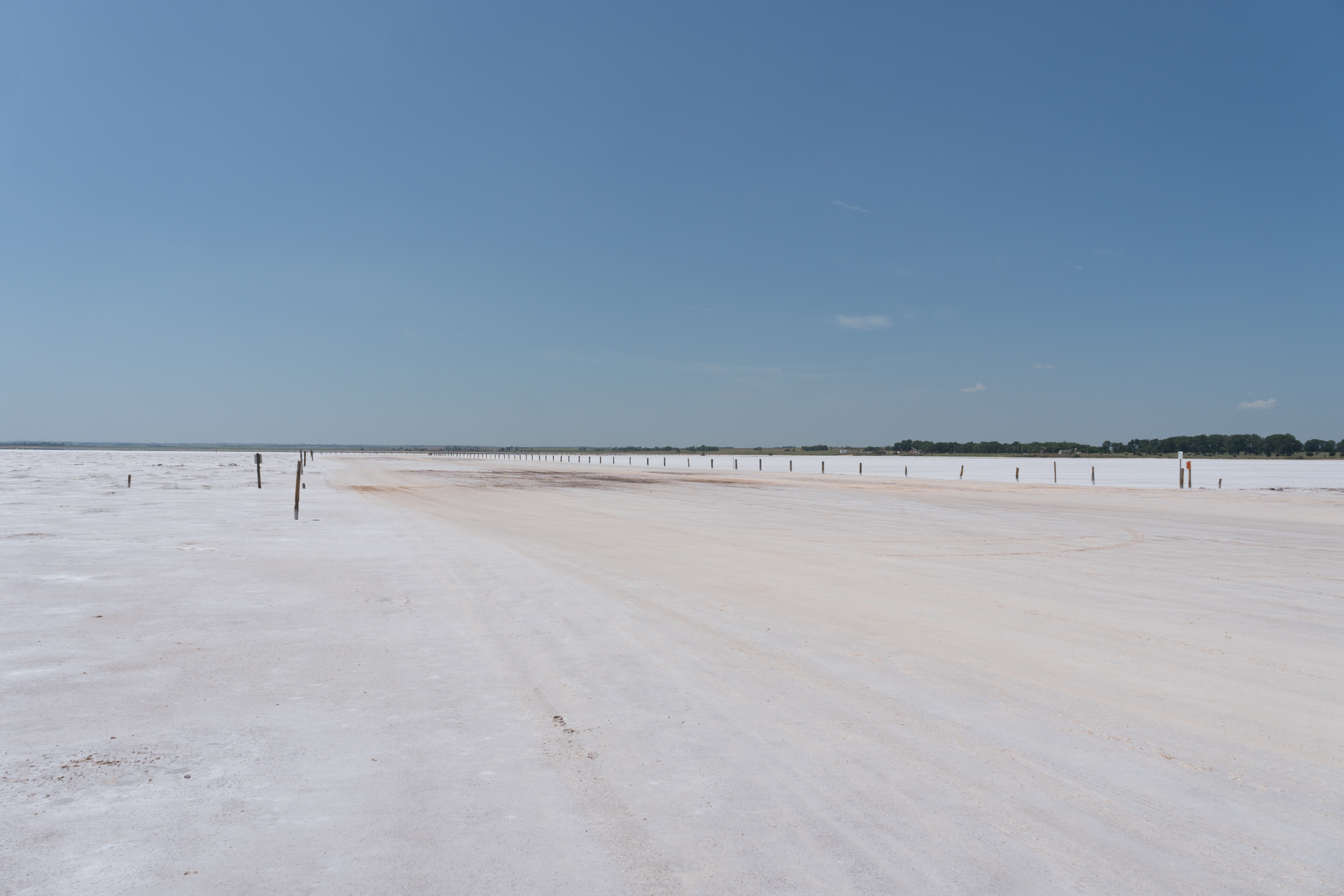
- The Salt Plains near the Crystal digging area

- Location within Oklahoma Location within the United States
- Location: Alfalfa County, Oklahoma
- Nearest city: Jet
- Coordinates: 36°45′01″N 98°13′27″W
- Area: 32,080 acres (129.8 km^{2})
- Established: 1930
- Governing body: United States Fish and Wildlife Service
- Website: Salt Plains National Wildlife Refuge

U.S. National Natural Landmark
- Designated: June 1983

The Salt Plains National Wildlife Refuge is part of the United States system of national wildlife refuges. It is located in Alfalfa County in northern Oklahoma, north of Jet (pop. 230), along Great Salt Plains Lake, which is formed by a dam on the Salt Fork of the Arkansas River.

The refuge was established March 26, 1930, by executive order of President Herbert Hoover, and contains 32,080 acres (130 km^{2}) of protected land as habitat to about 312 species of birds and 30 species of mammals. It was designated a national natural landmark in June 1983.

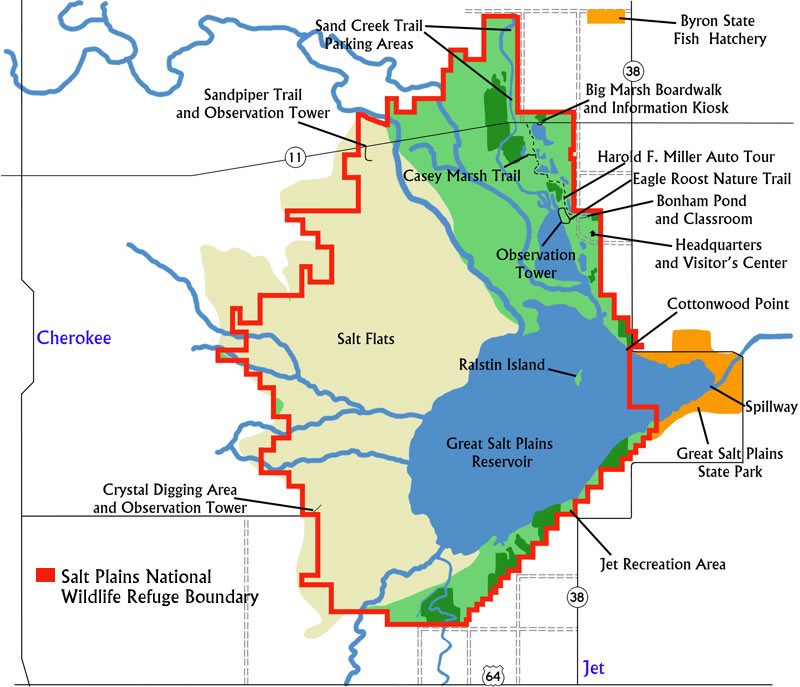
A map of the Salt Plains National Wildlife Refuge

== Refuge description ==
The Salt Plains were a favorite hunting ground for American Indians. Bison and other game came to the area to eat the salt and the heavily wooded and well-watered area along the Salt Fork River was like an oasis in the surrounding grassland of the Great Plains. Salt Plains refuge is divided into almost equal areas of nonvegetated salt flat, open water, and vegetated land. Marshes, woods, grasslands, and croplands dot the refuge. Management tools used to enhance the habitat for wildlife include farming, grazing, prescribed burns, construction of ponds, and wetland draining and flooding.

The refuge was created to be a resting and breeding ground for migratory waterfowl especially during fall and spring. The entire refuge is designated as critical habitat for the endangered whooping crane, which is mostly seen during fall migration. In addition, the refuge is home to endangered least terns, threatened snowy plovers, threatened bald eagles, and peregrine falcons. Large populations of American white pelicans migrate through between August and September, staying on the Great Salt Plains Reservoir. Great Salt Plains is one of the most important habitats for shorebirds in the Western Hemisphere.

=== Ralstin Island ===
Ralstin Island (closed to the public) is an important rookery in the Great Salt Plains Lake. The island was originally 25 acres (100,000 m^{2}), but has eroded to about 6 acres (20,000 m^{2}). It hosts more than 30,000 birds during breeding season. Over 30 species nest in the colony, including the white-faced ibis, great blue herons, and most notably, the tricolored heron.

== History of the Great Salt Plains ==
=== Osage control of Great Salt Plains ===
According to Historian Louis F. Burns, the Osage Indians used the salt found in the Great Salt Plains to bleach deer-skins and the Great Salt Plains gave the Osages a surplus of salt to trade with other tribes. According to Burns, the Osage were firmly in control of the Great Salt Plains by 1760 and because of a favorable combination of geographical factors, the Osages became the dominant force in mid-America. "In a one hundred twenty-five year period, 1678-1803, the Osages performed a feat no other American Indians duplicated", writes Burns. "They stopped the west-ward expansion of the Euro-American peoples and simultaneously tripled the size of their own domain."

=== Sibley Expedition ===
George Champlin Sibley was appointed head trader at the Indian Factory at Fort Osage, Missouri, when it opened in 1808. While at Fort Osage, Sibley quickly engaged in creating relationships with the neighboring Osage tribes. In May 1811 Sibley's expedition left Fort Osage to examine the hunting grounds of the Osage. In 1811 his expedition was said to be the first white men to visit the plains. Sibley's expedition, leaving from Fort Osage, Missouri was guided by an Osage Indian named Sans Orielle. Sibley named the area the Grand Saline. Sibley cut short his expedition when informed by reports that bands of Comanche were nearby. Sibley returned to Fort Osage on July 11, 1811 and reported that the salt deposits would eventually prove commercially profitable.

=== Native American usage ===
The Great Salt Plains have been the scene of many Indian Councils, both of war and peace. Because animals flocked to the area for the salt, the Great Salt Plains made for excellent hunting and it became obvious that any tribe that controlled the Salt Plains would have to contend with intrusions by other tribes. Therefore the Treaty of New Echota signed in 1835, provided the Cherokee Nation with ownership of the Cherokee Outlet but declared that the saline areas were to be accessible to use by other tribes. In drafting the treaty the United States Government withheld the Salt Plains area with the provision that, "The right is reserved to the United States to allow other tribes of red men to get salt on the Great Salt Plains in common with the Cherokee Tribe."

=== Chemical weapons discovery ===
In 2007, a Boy Scout digging for crystals uncovered a collection of 7.5-inch vials containing chemical agents such as mustard gas, lewisite, chloropicrin, and phosgene. The vials were part of World War II-era military chemical agent identification sets. The burial of vials was standard procedure for removing them from service at that time. No record of a disposal site was reported at the salt plains. Crystal digging was suspended from April 2007 until April 2009, while the risk of allowing digging again was evaluated; 171 vials and at least a dozen incendiary devices were removed from the location. The salt plains were also used as a bombing and strafing range during World War II. Remnants of this use are still left on the plains.

== Recreation ==
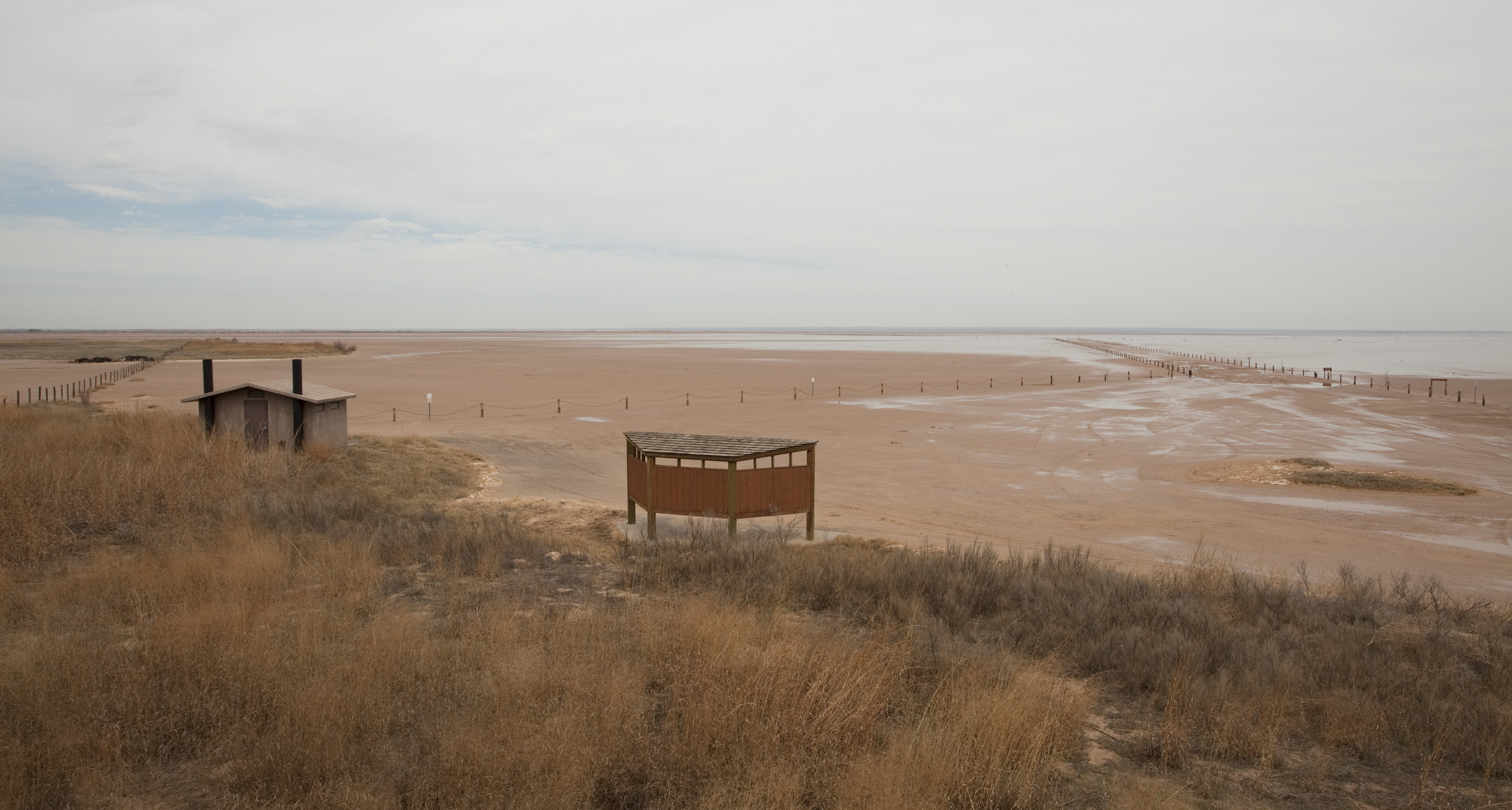
A wet day at Crystal digging area of the Salt Plains

Driving tour: The Harold F. Miller Auto Tour begins near the nature center. It is 2.5 miles (4 km) long and ends at Highway 11. The dirt road passes by ponds and fields where crops for wildlife are cultivated. White-tailed deer and other wildlife are common. A trail of 0.25 miles (400 m) leads to Casey Marsh Tower, where waterfowl are abundant and bald eagles can be seen in fall and winter.

Hiking: The Sandpiper Trail begins near the nature center and refuge office and leads 0.35 miles (600 m) to the edge of the salt flats and a birding observation platform. The Eagle Roost Nature Trail is a 1.25-mile (2.0 km) loop also beginning near the nature center. The trail goes through wooded and open areas, beneath towering cottonwood trees, past marshes and ponds, and to a shore and waterfowl watching area on Sand Creek Bay.

Selenite crystals: A designated area of the 11,000 acres (45 km^{2}) of salt flats at the refuge has gypsum concentrations high enough to grow selenite, a crystalline form of gypsum. The selenite crystals found there have an hourglass-shaped sand inclusion that is not known to occur in selenite crystals found elsewhere in the world. Digging for crystals is allowed, but only from April 1 through October 15 to protect this vital Whooping Crane habitat.

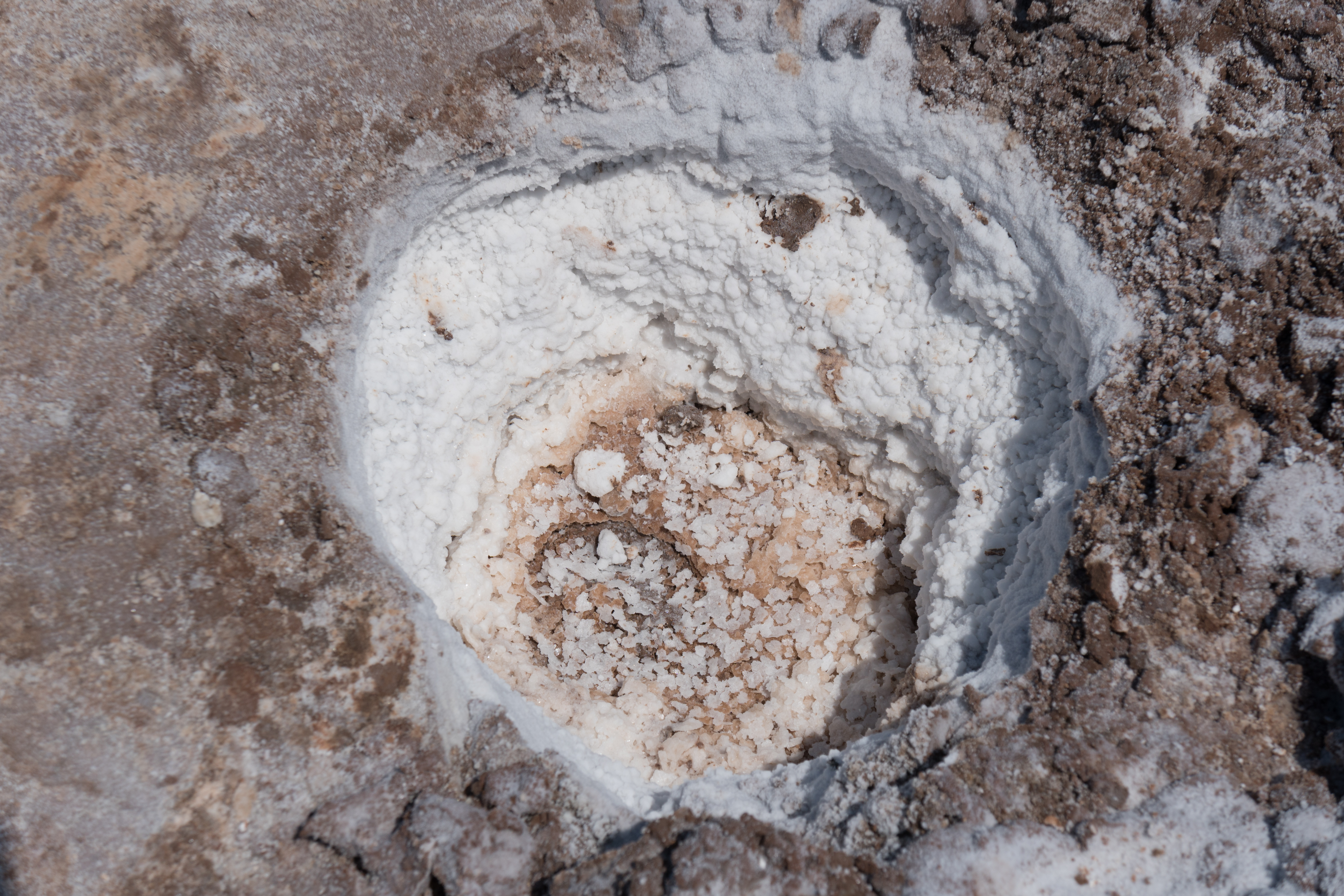
A hole dug in the Digging Area

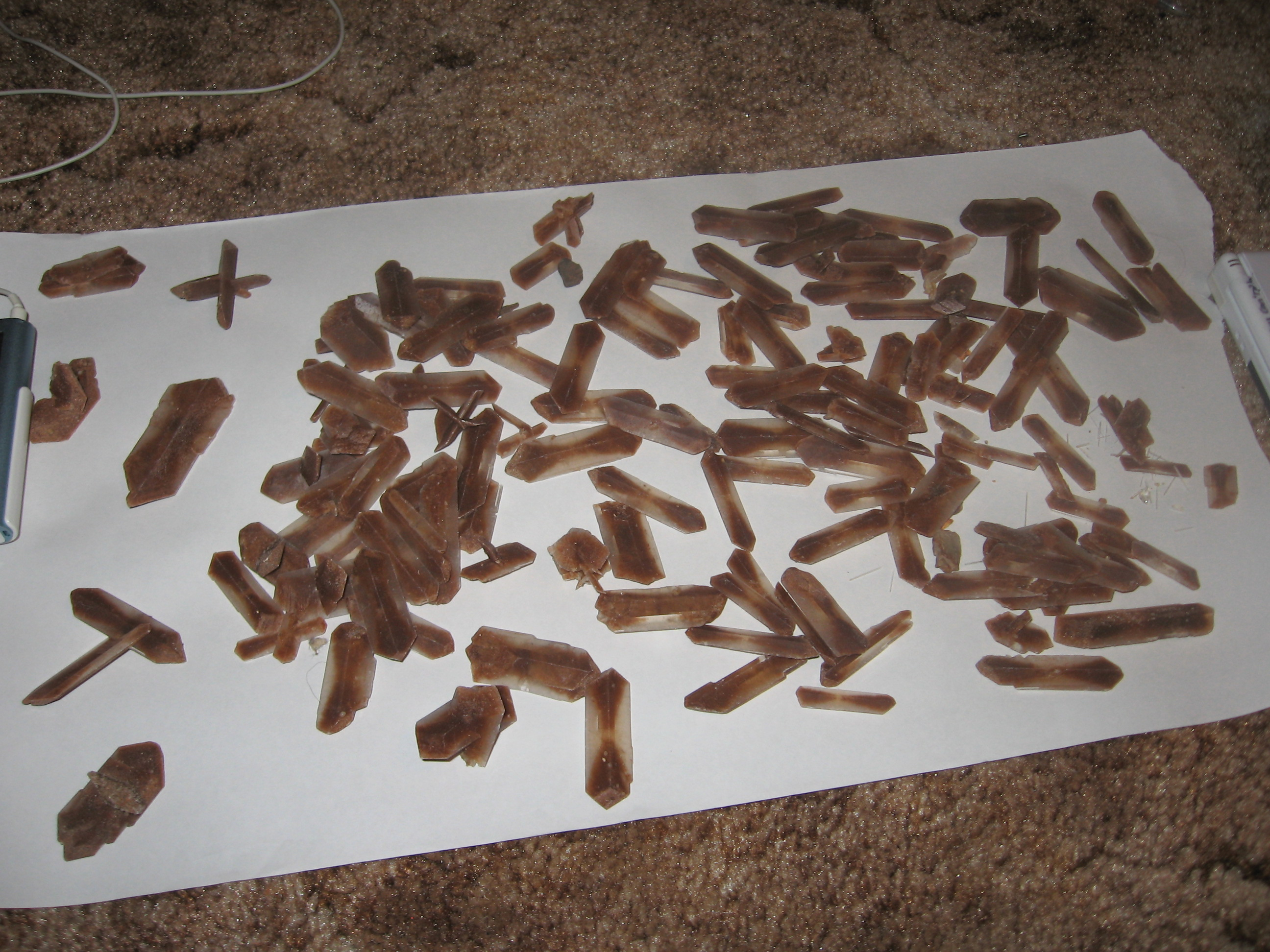
Many selenite crystals found in a single day

Blade / penetration twins type of selenite crystal

Hunting: About 1,250 acres (5 km^{2}) of the refuge north of Highway 11 are open for hunting. State laws apply, except deer may be hunted by permit only. Hunting is permitted for pheasant, northern bobwhite quail, mourning dove, ducks, geese, and sandhill cranes.

Fishing: According to the U.S. Army Corps of Engineers, the extreme drought of 2011 and 2012 has almost ended fishing as a recreational activity at the refuge. These conditions caused very large fish kills in the reservoir and restocking has been suspended. Fishing downstream of the dam is still permitted, but is greatly affected by local precipitation and the flow of the Great Salt River.

Information that follows indicate the practices in force prior to the 2011 drought, and may no longer apply: Fishing is permitted from April 1 to October 15 on most of the refuge. Closed areas are marked by buoys or signs. Fishing in Bonham Pond is permitted only for children under 14 and mobility-handicapped persons and is catch-and-release. Salt Plains Lake is noted for large channel and other catfish. Other game fish include striped bass, largemouth bass, crappie, white bass, panfish, and walleye. State laws apply for bag limits and seasons, and the use of boats in the river and creeks is prohibited.

== See also ==
- Great Salt Plains State Park
- Central Great Plains (ecoregion)
- The Great Plains Ecoregion
