= Great Salt Plains State Park =

State park in Oklahoma, United States

- Location within Oklahoma
- Location: Alfalfa County, Oklahoma, United States
- Nearest city: Jet, OK
- Coordinates: 36.7394740°N 98.1442330°W
- Area: 840 acres (340 ha)
- Visitors: 164,901 (in 2021)
- Governing body: Oklahoma Tourism and Recreation Department
- Website: www.travelok.com/listings/view.profile/id.3204

Great Salt Plains State Park is a 840-acre (3.4 km^{2}) Oklahoma state park located in Alfalfa County, Oklahoma. It is located 8 miles (13 km) north of Jet, Oklahoma on SH-38 and 12 miles (19 km) east of Cherokee. Recreational opportunities at Great Salt Plains State Park include boating, camping, picnicking, swimming, hiking, mountain biking and exploring. The Great Salt Plains Lake is located at the park and covers 9,300 acres (38 km^{2}) with 41 miles (66 km) of shoreline and is a shallow, salty lake with fishing opportunities for catfish, saugeye, sandbass and hybrid striper. The average depth is reportedly 4 feet (1.2 m) and the impoundment capacity is 31,420 acre-feet. Salinity of the water in the reservoir is one-fourth that of sea water. Personal watercraft are not recommended. The park has RV and tent sites, comfort stations with showers, cabins, picnic sites, group shelters, swimming beach, playgrounds, boat ramps, fishing dock and equestrian trails. Horse rental is not available.

The Great Salt Plains cover an area of 11,000 acres (45 km^{2}). It was so named because it is covered with a layer of salt deposited long ago by an inland sea. A saline aquifer still flows beneath the surface and replenishes the salt whenever the water table rises. The salt is left behind when the water evaporates. The first white men to visit this area were members of the Sibley expedition in 1811, who named it the Grand Saline.

President Herbert Hoover designated an area of the Salt Fork east of Cherokee, Oklahoma as a National Wildlife Refuge on March 26, 1930. The Great Salt Plains National Wildlife Refuge sits adjacent to the park and offers great bird watching and fall foliage viewing opportunities.

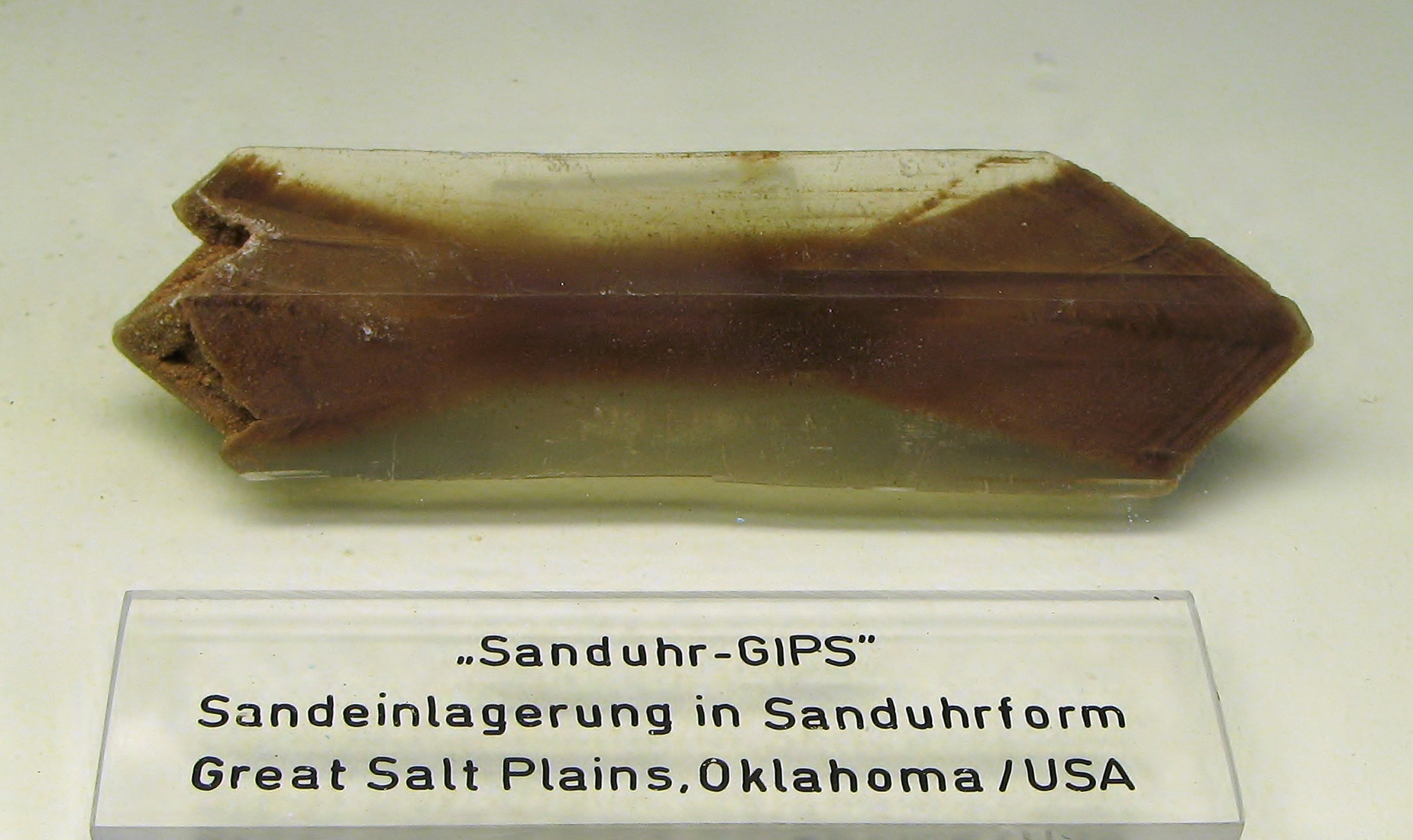
Gypsum, special variety: Hourglass-Gypsum (embedded sand in type of an hourglass) – Exposed in the Mineralogical Museum, Bonn, Germany

The refuge is the only spot in the world where crystal enthusiasts can dig for hourglass selenite, a rare and fragile form of selenite, which is a form of gypsum. Digging times are available from April 1 through October 15.

== Fees ==
To help fund a backlog of deferred maintenance and park improvements, the state implemented an entrance fee for this park and 21 others effective June 15, 2020. The fees, charged per vehicle, start at $10 per day for a single-day or $8 for residents with an Oklahoma license plate or Oklahoma tribal plate. Fees are waived for honorably discharged veterans and Oklahoma residents age 62 & older and their spouses. Passes good for three days or a week are also available; annual passes good at all 22 state parks charging fees are offered at a cost of $75 for out-of-state visitors or $60 for Oklahoma residents. The 22 parks are:

- Arrowhead Area at Lake Eufaula State Park
- Beavers Bend State Park
- Boiling Springs State Park
- Cherokee Landing State Park
- Fort Cobb State Park
- Foss State Park
- Honey Creek Area at Grand Lake State Park
- Great Plains State Park
- Great Salt Plains State Park
- Greenleaf State Park
- Keystone State Park
- Lake Eufaula State Park
- Lake Murray State Park
- Lake Texoma State Park
- Lake Thunderbird State Park
- Lake Wister State Park
- Natural Falls State Park
- Osage Hills State Park
- Robbers Cave State Park
- Sequoyah State Park
- Tenkiller State Park
- Twin Bridges Area at Grand Lake State Park
