= Cheyenne Bottoms =

Wetland in Kansas, United States

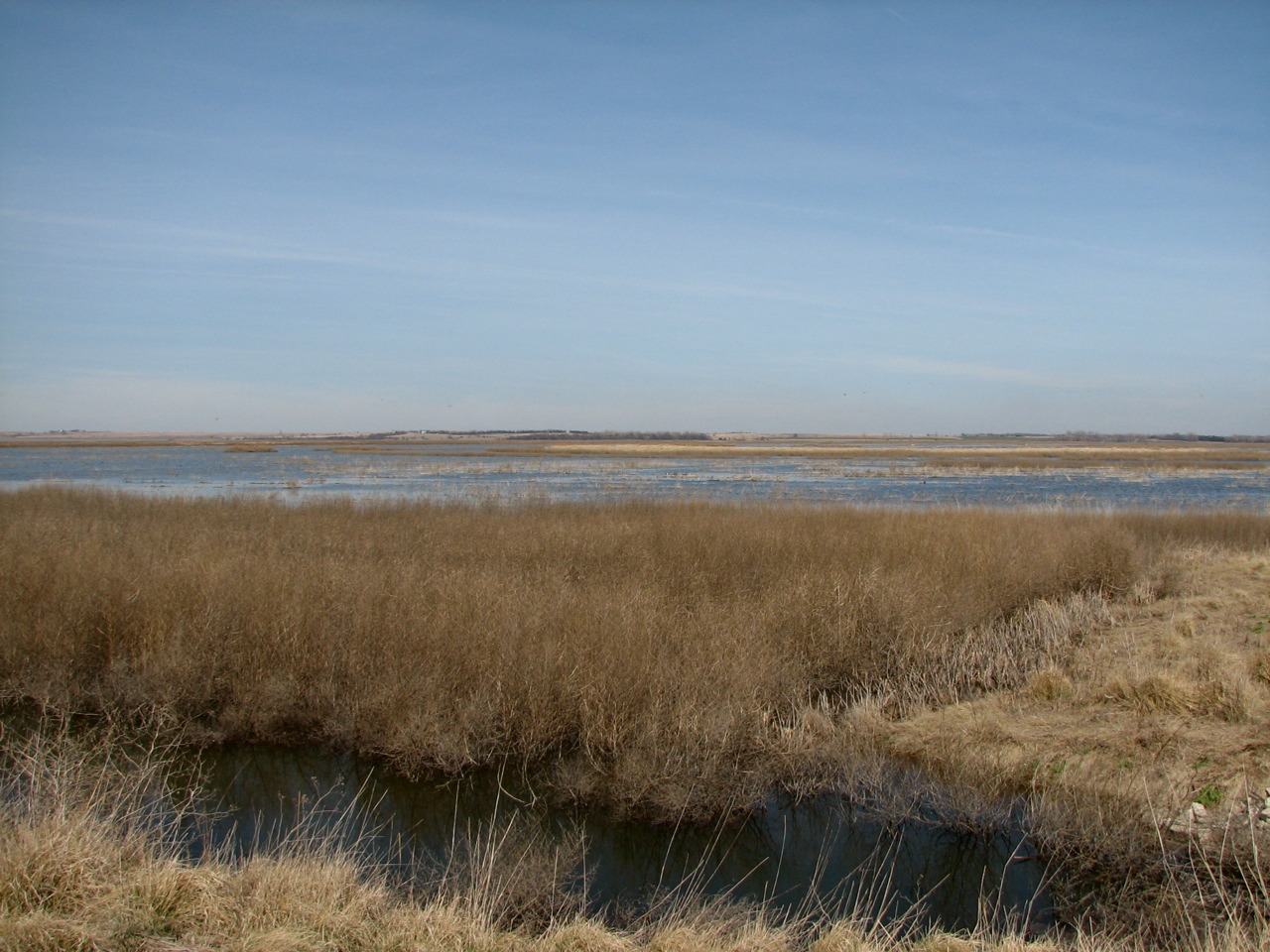
- Cheyenne Bottoms marshes are the largest wetland in the Great Plains.

- Location within Kansas

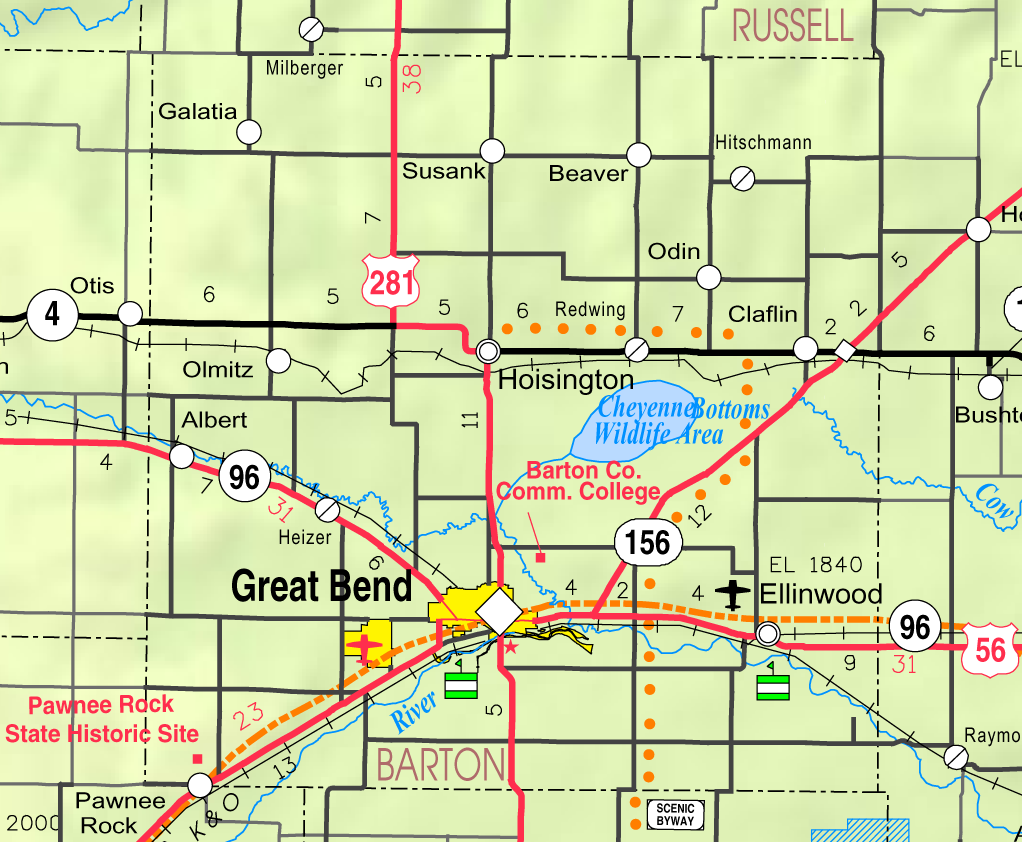
- KDOT map of Barton County (legend)
- Location: Barton County, Kansas
- Coordinates: 38°28′10″N 98°39′21″W
- Type: Wetland
- Primary inflows: Blood Creek, Deception Creek
- Primary outflows: Little Cheyenne Creek
- Basin countries: United States
- Surface area: 64 sq mi (170 km^{2})
- Average depth: 1 foot (0.30 m)
- Max. depth: 4 feet (1.2 m)
- Surface elevation: 1,795 feet (547 m)

Ramsar Wetland
- Designated: 19 October 1988
- Reference no.: 411

Cheyenne Bottoms is a wetland in the central Great Plains of North America. Occupying approximately 41,000 acres (170 km^{2}; 64 sq mi) in central Kansas, it is the largest wetland in the interior United States. The Bottoms is a critical stopping point on the Central Flyway for millions of birds which migrate through the region annually.

== History ==
According to legend, a battle in 1825 between the Cheyenne and the Kiowa (or Pawnee) turned one of the streams blood red. Blood Creek now flows into the lowlands. Greyhound racing in the United States traces its start to a coursing event in the bottoms in 1886.

In 1900, a project known as the Koen Ditch attempted to divert Arkansas River water 12 miles (19 km) to the Bottoms so that it could be used for irrigation. The ditch washed out in a flood. During the 1920s, various plans were put forth to drain the Bottoms and convert it to farmland. However, residents downstream in Hutchinson, Kansas protested that doing so would create flooding problems for them.

In 1925, the Kansas Forestry, Fish and Game Commission was created to develop and care for the Bottoms. In August 1927, 14 inches (36 cm) of rain upstream turned it overnight into "Lake Cheyenne" and caused flooding downstream of Little Cheyenne Creek. Kansas politicians including Clifford Hope, Charles Curtis, Henry Allen and Arthur Capper made an unsuccessful plea to get federal money to convert it into a National Wildlife Refuge. Following the Pittman–Robertson Federal Aid in Wildlife Restoration Act of 1937, which taxed sporting arms and ammunition, funds became available to develop the Bottoms.

In 1952, after the construction of dikes, roads and hunting blinds, part of the area was opened to public hunting. In 1957, a new canal from the Arkansas River was built. However, relatively little water from the Arkansas was pumped into the wetland because of drought and claims by other entities on the water supply. In the 1990s, an extensive renovation subdivided the marshes. The renovations allowed the marshes to be more self-sustaining, although an adequate water supply and management of water levels continue to be critical problems.

Also in the 1990s, The Nature Conservancy began acquiring land adjacent to the state wildlife area.

== Geography ==
Cheyenne Bottoms is located at 38°28′10″N 98°39′21″W (38.4694559, -98.6559125) at an elevation of 1,795 feet (547 m). It lies in central Kansas in the Arkansas River Lowlands region of the Great Plains. Its primary inflows are two small local streams, Blood Creek and Deception Creek, which flow into it from the northwest. Its other inflow is an inlet canal from Walnut Creek to the southwest. The wetland's primary outflow is an outlet canal to Little Cheyenne Creek to the southeast. Little Cheyenne Creek empties into Cow Creek, a tributary of the Arkansas River. Cheyenne Bottoms lies entirely within Barton County.

The entire wetland occupies a natural land sink spanning 41,000 acres or 64 square miles (170 km^{2}). Of that area, 19,857 acres (80.36 km^{2}) constitutes the Cheyenne Bottoms Wildlife Area. The Bottoms is impounded and divided into a set of pools by a network of dikes. Pool 1, itself subdivided into three sub-pools, comprises the center of the wetland with Pool 2 located to its west, Pools 3A and 3B to its north, Pools 4A and 4B to its east, and Pool 5 to its south.

U.S. Route 281 runs north-south 2 miles (3.2 km) west of the Bottoms. Kansas Highway 4 lies to the north and runs east-west, and Kansas Highway 156 runs northeast-southwest through the wetland's southeast portion. The Bottoms is directly accessible via a network of unpaved gravel roads, several of which run along the tops of the dikes.

== Geology ==
The formation of the wetland in a natural basin in a semi-arid area is not entirely understood. It is surrounded on the north, east, and west by bluffs as high as 100 feet (30 m). The basin traps the water of Blood and Deception Creeks. One of the most popular theories is that Cheyenne Bottoms was created as a sinkhole when incoming freshwater dissolved underground salt. However, this theory is challenged by critics who say that not enough salt is present in the base to cause this.

Other theories to explain the formation of Cheyenne Bottoms are that there was structural movement in its base, that it was part of a Pleistocene drainage system involving the Smoky Hill River, and that it was created by sand dunes that scoured the flatlands and blocked drainage.

== Description ==
Historically, Cheyenne Bottoms has been a lake of varying size, a mudflat, or dry. With management to control water and provide a secure way-station for migrating waterfowl and shore birds, it now has 5 pools, crisscrossed by dikes, canals, and pathways, that cover most of the acreage of the wildlife management area. The pools average less than one foot deep. Pools one and five are closed to all human activities. Surrounding the pools are mudflats, ponds, and islands. Elevated areas are primarily grasslands with a few trees. Waterfowl hunting, primarily for geese, is permitted along the southern border of the state wildlife management area.

== Wildlife ==
Cheyenne Bottoms is especially noted for the concentration of migratory shorebirds that come here to feed on the mudflats. As many as 600,000 shorebirds from 39 species pass through Cheyenne Bottoms during spring migration and up to 200,000 in fall. About 45 percent of all shorebirds in North America utilize the area. Cheyenne Bottoms is critical habitat for many endangered species, including the whooping crane.

At least 340 species of birds have been observed at Cheyenne Bottoms.

As a critical habitat for threatened and endangered bird species, Cheyenne Bottoms is one of 29 places in the United States on the List of Ramsar wetlands of international importance.

== Management ==
A core 19,857 acres (80.36 km^{2}; 31.03 sq mi) parcel belongs to the Kansas Department of Wildlife and Parks (KDWP). The Nature Conservancy owns an adjacent 7,300 acres (29.54 km^{2}; 11.41 sq mi). The Kansas State and Nature Conservancy lands are managed with the objective of providing a diverse marsh habitat for the use of migrating and breeding waterfowl and shorebirds.

== Tourism and recreation ==
The Kansas Wetlands Education Center within the wildlife management area interprets the wetlands and wildlife for visitors. Approximately 600 people visit Cheyenne Bottoms yearly.

On January 29, 2008, Quivira National Wildlife Refuge and Cheyenne Bottoms were jointly named as one of the 8 Wonders of Kansas.

== See also ==
- List of Kansas state parks
- List of lakes, reservoirs, and dams in Kansas
- List of rivers of Kansas
