= Great Salt Plains Lake =

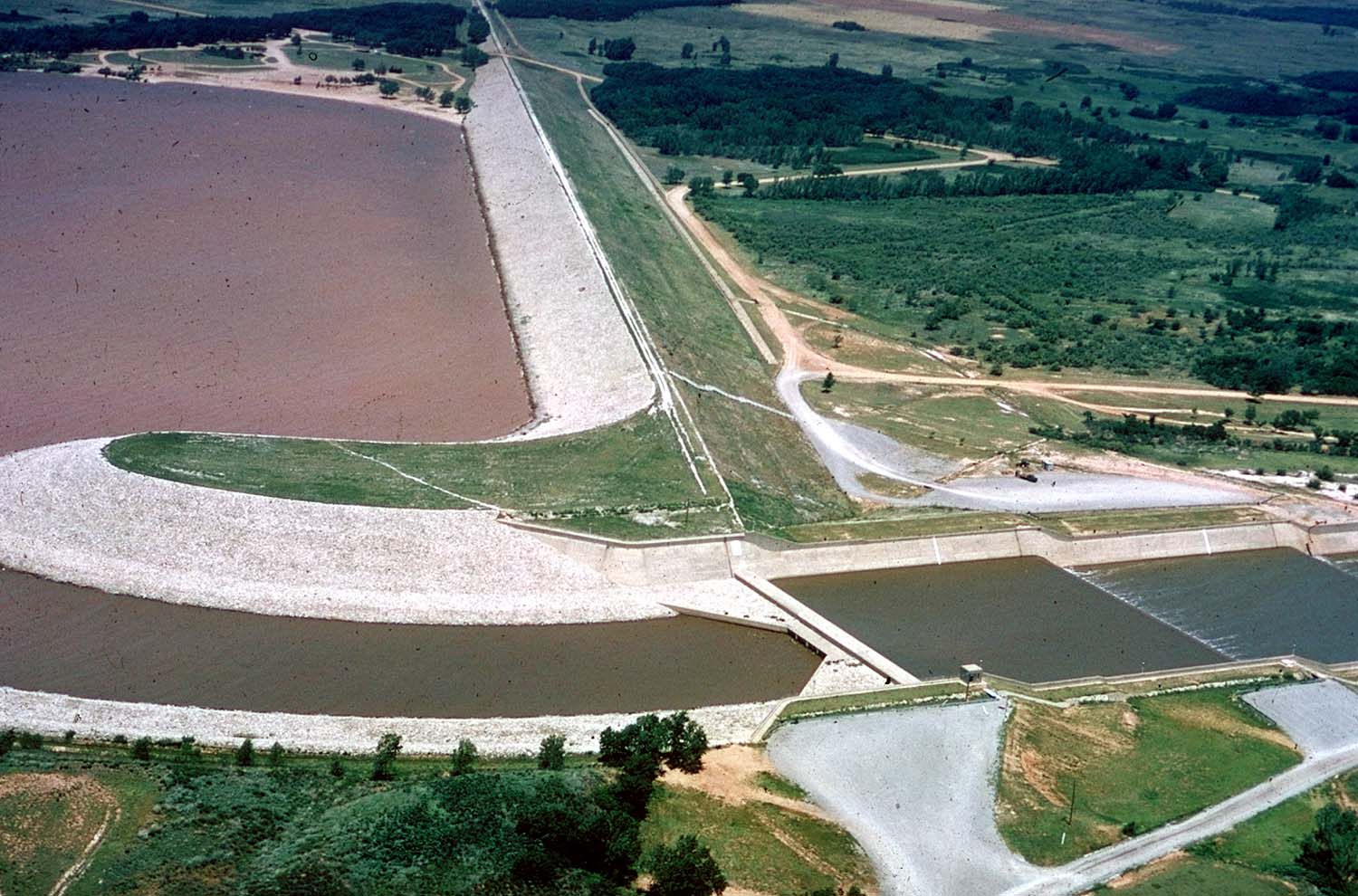
- Aerial view of Great Salt Plains Lake Dam on the Salt Fork Arkansas River

- Location within Oklahoma Location within the United States
- Location: Alfalfa County, Oklahoma
- Coordinates: 36°44′34.34″N 98°11′18.31″W
- Lake type: reservoir
- Basin countries: United States
- Surface area: 9,300 acres (3,800 ha)
- Average depth: 4 ft (1.2 m)
- Water volume: 31,420 acre⋅ft (38.76 hm^{3})
- Shore length^{1}: 91 mi (146 km)
- Islands: 1
- ^{1} Shore length is not a well-defined measure.

Great Salt Plains Lake is a reservoir located within the Salt Plains National Wildlife Refuge in Alfalfa County, Oklahoma in the United States named because of the salt flats in the area and for the Salt Fork Arkansas River, which is dammed to form the lake. It is notable for the variety of birds that are attracted to Ralstin Island (not open to the public) and also for the selenite crystals that can be collected along the shoreline. Recent droughts, most notably that of 2011, have had an adverse effect on the future of the lake.

== Physical description ==
A study made in 1931 for the United States Army Corps of Engineers proposed building a flood control dam in the Great Salt Plains area. Congress authorized its construction in 1936. Design studies began in 1937 and the Corps broke ground for construction in September 1938. The dam was completed in July 1941, with a water capacity of 31,420 acre-feet (38,760,000 m^{3}). The lake covers 9,300 acres (38 km^{2}) and has 91 miles (146 km) of shoreline. The average depth is 4 feet (1.2 m). The saline content is reportedly one-fourth that of the ocean.

Ralstin Island, created at the same time as the lake, is home to blue heron, great egret and ibis. The island is considered one of the most important colonial bird nesting habitats, and is the largest breeding site in the state for the white-faced ibis. The fish vary from catfish, saugeye (related to the walleye) sandbass and hybrid striped bass.

The State of Oklahoma leased 800 acres (3.2 km^{2}) on August 1, 1958, for a state park.

== Selenite crystals ==
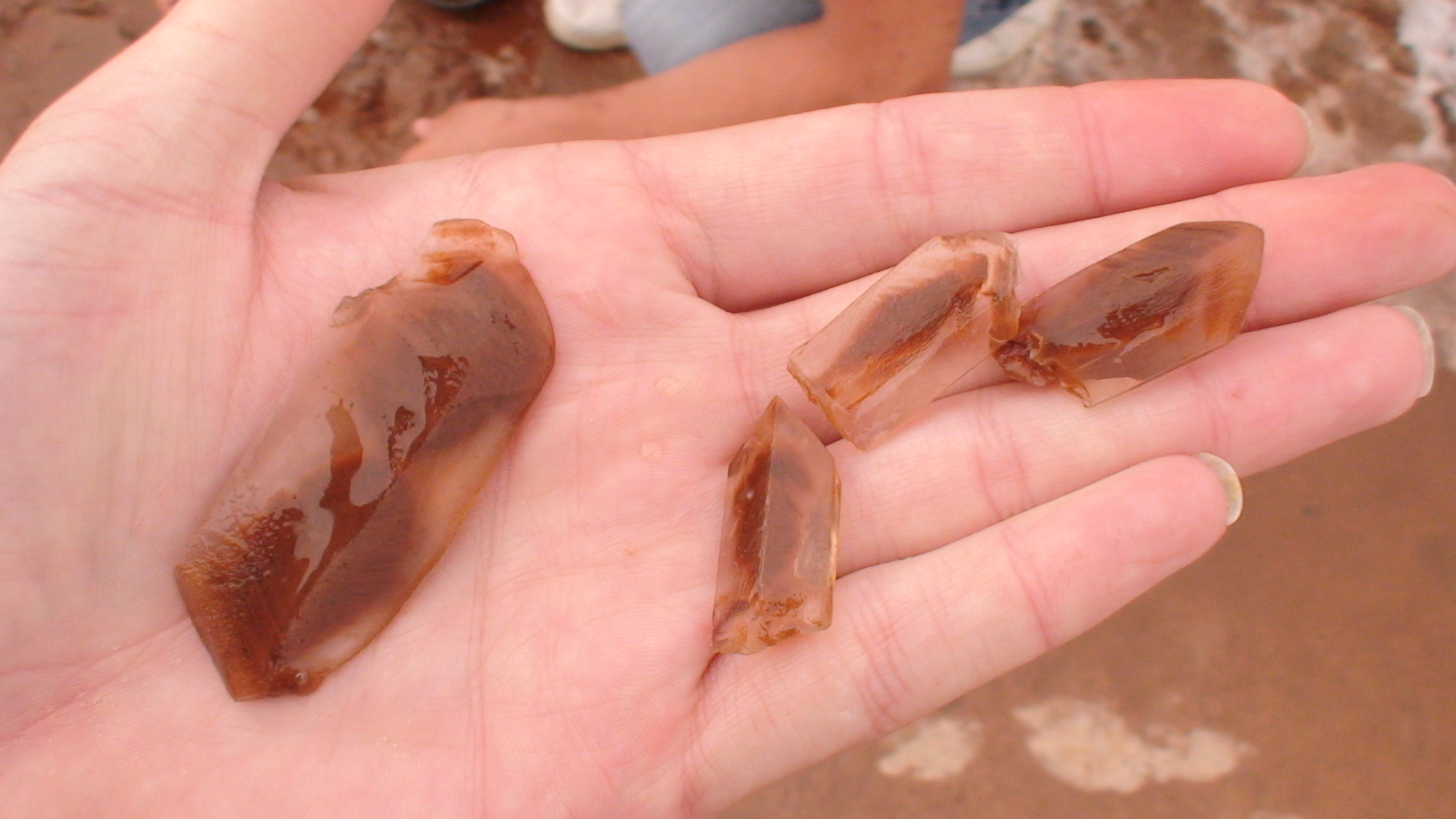
Selenite crystals dug up from the lake bed.

On the west edge of the lake, visitors can dig for selenite crystals. These crystals feature an hourglass inclusion which is unique to the Great Salt Plains. Scientists believe that salt was deposited during repeated water-level rises of a shallow sea millions of years ago. The supply of salt is kept intact by saline groundwater that flows just a few feet below the surface. When the water evaporates, a layer of salt remains on the surface. This process also plays a role in the formation of selenite crystals that visitors covet.

== Future of the lake ==
The lake is subject to periodic mass fish kills, most recently in 2011. During the extreme drought of that year, the average depth decreased to 2 feet (0.61 m). According to John Stahl, northwest fisheries supervisor for the Oklahoma Department of Wildlife Conservation, the lake has grown more shallow since its creation because of silting and agricultural runoff. That and extremely hot dry summers cause the brine to become more concentrated. Oxygen in the water is mostly consumed by bacteria that break down organic matter in the water, leaving insufficient oxygen to support the fish.

According to officials of the U.S. Army Corps of Engineers, the future of the lake appears grim if no remedial action is taken. Proposed solutions are:

- Open the dam and allow the lake to flow into the river.
- Dig the silt out of the reservoir, which could cost $5 – 10 million.
- Plug the dam to raise the water level.

There is a law requiring that a non federal partner help pay for restoration. The Corps regards this as an unlikely event. If no action is taken, the Corps has said that the seafood source will be depleted and the birds will abandon the lake.

== Recreation ==
Also located along the shores of Great Salt Plains Lake is Great Salt Plains State Park. Recreational opportunities at Great Salt Plains State Park include boating, camping, picnicking, swimming, hiking, mountain biking and exploring. The park has RV and tent sites, comfort stations with showers, cabins, picnic sites, group shelters, swimming beach, playgrounds, boat ramps, fishing dock and equestrian trails.

== See also ==
Salt Plains National Wildlife Refuge
