= English-language press of the Socialist Party of America =

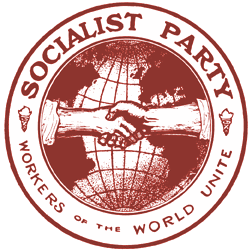
Logo of the Socialist Party of America, established August 1901

This is a list of newspapers and magazines in the United States owned by, or editorially supportive of, the Socialist Party of America (SPA, established 1901).

Also included are papers associated with the direct predecessors of the SPA — the Social Democratic Party of America with headquarters in Chicago (split from the Social Democracy of America in 1898) and the Social Democratic Party of America with headquarters in Springfield, Massachusetts (split from the Socialist Labor Party of America in 1899).

The format is: (1) Title, (2) place of publication, (3) publisher, (4) (dates).

Dates indicated are the years the papers were known to be in press and allied with the Socialist Party, not necessarily all years of publication.

== Alaska ==
- Alaska Socialist, Fairbanks (1913-19??)
- Free Press, Fairbanks (1914-1914)
- Socialist Press, Fairbanks (1914-19??)
- Tanana Valley Socialist, Fairbanks (19??-19??)

== Arkansas ==
- Arkansas Socialist, Little Rock: L.W. Lowry and S.W. Harvey (1906-1907)
- Call to Action, Paragould (1912-19??)
- Commoner, Mena (1938-19??)
- Commoner, Pine Bluff: Amasa George Hurd (1906-1907)
- Commonwealth College Fortnightly, Mena (1925-1938)
- Crawford County Star, Van Buren (1913)
- Critic, Piggott: Charles N. Walker (1912-1917)
- Fair Deal, Siloam Springs (1907)
- Greene County Socialist, Paragould (1913-1914)
- Hot Springs Clarion, Hot Springs (1913)
- Huntington Herald, Huntington: Dan Hogan (1901-1912)
  - Southern Worker, Huntington: Dan Hogan (1912-c. 1916)
- Investigator, Green Forest, Berryville: J.W. Fairchild (1911-1913)
- Jefferson County Agitator, Pine Bluff: George Washington Galloway (1913-1914)
- Monroe County Socialist, Clarendon (1913)
- People's Friend, Rogers: W.A. Daugherty, A.M. Merrill (1909-1915)
- Pioneer, Maddock (White County): John Harlan (1908-1912)
- Pulaski County Socialist, Little Rock (1913)
- Red Flag, Fort Smith (1913)
- Revolutionist, Jonesboro (1913)
- White County Worker, Judsonia (1913)
- Workers’ Weekly, Little Rock: W.H. Tanner and C.H. Reeb (1915)

== California ==
- California Progressive Leader, Los Angeles (1939-194?)
- California Social-Democrat, Los Angeles (1911-19??)
- California Socialist, San Francisco (1902-1903)
- Class Struggle, San Francisco (1899-1901)
  - Advance, San Francisco (1901-1902)
- Common Sense, Los Angeles (1904-1909)
- Forum, Stockton (1921-1959)
- Labor Action, San Francisco (1936-1937)
- Los Angeles Socialist, Los Angeles (1901-1904)
- New Charter, Santa Cruz (1893-1898)
- Revolt, San Francisco (1911-19??)
- Western Comrade, Los Angeles: Job Harriman, Frank E. Wolfe (1913-1918)

== Colorado ==
- World for the Workers, Denver (1913)

== Connecticut ==
- Bridgeport Examiner, Bridgeport (1913-19??)
- Sunbeam, Hartford (1841-18??)

== Florida ==
- The Courier, Crystal Springs
- Florida Beacon, Tampa, Frank Sullivan and later George Miller (1911-?)

== Idaho ==
- Inland Empire Echo, Lewison (1911-?)

== Illinois ==
- American Appeal, Chicago (1926-1927)
- American Socialist, Chicago: J. Louis Engdahl (1914-1917)
- Chicago Evening World, Chicago (1912-1912)
- Chicago Labor, Chicago (1893-1893)
- Chicago Socialist, Chicago (1902-1907)
- Chicago Socialist, Chicago (1912-19??)
- Christian Socialist, Danville (1903-1916)
- International Socialist Review, Chicago (1900-1918)
- Nauvoo Tribune, Nauvoo (1852-18??)
- Party Builder, Chicago (1912-1914)
- Quincy Socialist, Quincy (1913)
- Rock Island County Socialist, Moline (1913)
- Social Democratic Herald, Chicago (1898-1913)
- Social Justice, Canton (1915-19??)
- Socialist Alliance, Chicago (1896-1???)
- Socialist, Chicago (1878-18??)
- Solidarity, Chicago (1920-1921)
- Tri-City Leader, Illinois
- Workers' Call, Chicago (1899-1906)
- Chicago Daily Socialist, Chicago (1906-1912)
- Young People's Socialist Magazine, Chicago: William F. Kruse

== Indiana ==
- Coming Nation, Greensburg (1893-1913)
- Indiana Socialist, Indianapolis (1907-1907)
- Social Democrat, Terre Haute (1897-1898)

== Iowa ==
- Boone County Searchlight, Boone (1913)
- Cerro Gordo Leader, Mason City (1913)
- Clinton County Socialist, Lyons (1913)
- Council Bluffs Socialist, Council Bluffs (1913)
- Dallas County Worker, Perry (1913)
- Floyd County Socialist, Charles City (1913)
- Iowa Socialist, Dubuque (1902-1904)
- Linn County Searchlight, Cedar Rapids (1913)
- Marshall County Tocsin, Marshalltown (1913)
- Monroe County Leader, Albia (1913)
- Muscatine County Socialist, Muscatine (1913)
- Ottumwa Referendum, Ottumwa (1913)
- Scott County Socialist, Davenport (1913)
- Searchlight, Grinnell (1913)
- Vanguard, Waterloo (1913)
- Voice of the Toilers, Centerville (1913)

== Kansas ==
- Advance, Dodge City: Kramer and Joquel (1900-1901)
- American Freeman, Girard: Emanual Haldeman-Julius (1929-1951)
- American Non-Conformist, Girard: H.L. Vincent (1886-1891)
- Appeal to Reason, Girard: J.A. Wayland (1895-1922)
  - New Appeal, Girard (1917-1918)
  - Haldeman-Julius Weekly, Girard: Emanuel Haldeman-Julius (1922-1929)
- Chanute Leader, Chanute (1913)
- Coming Nation, Girard: J.A. Wayland and Fred D. Warren. (1910-1913)
- Crusader, Iola: Socialist Crusader Publishing Co. (1914-1915)
- Decatur County Socialist, Oberlin: Socialist Campaign Co. (1906)
- Emporia Convincer, Emporia: Emporia Convincer Publishing Co. (1912)
- Freedom's Banner, Iola: Socialist Co-operative Publishing Co. (1913-1914)
- Girard News, Girard: Black and Laughlin (1878-1879)
- Graham Gem, Hill City: T.H. McGill (1897-1901)
- Gunn Powder, Pittsburg: John Walker Gunn (1913-1914)
- Harvey County Socialist, Newton (1913)
- Independent News, Girard: H.P. Button (1896-1909)
- Iola Co-operator, Iola: Iola Co-operator Publishing Co. (1912-1913)
  - Freedom's Banner, Iola (1913)
- Labor Herald, Pittsburg: Sears and Leftwich (1911-1913)
- Leavenworth Socialist, Leavenworth (1913)
- Line-Up, Kansas City: Line-Up Publishing Co. (1904-1905)
- Linn County Searchlight, Pleasanton (1913)
- Long Island Leader, Long Island: J.N. Curl. (1886-1905)
- Moreland Independent, Moreland: Thomas H. McGill (1901-1902)
- National Socialist, Girard: Fred D. Warren (1914)
- News and Views, Sedan (1913)
- People's Advocate, Munden: P.J. George (1912-1913)
- Progressive Herald, Lawrence: Workers Co-operative Publishing Co. (1913-1915)
- Prolucutor, Syracuse: Prolocutor Publishing Co. (1909-1911)
- Recall, Arkansas City: H.I. Bryant (c. 1911-1914)
- Saline County Socialist, Salina (1913)
- Shawnee County Socialist, Topeka: Socialist Co-operative Publishing Co. (1913-1914)
- Social Ethics, Wichita: G. Lowthern and T.E. Will (1904-1905)
- Weekly Peoples' Forum, Lawrence: (1919)
- Worker's Call, Wichita: Wichita Socialist Press Association (1912)
- Worker's Chronicle, Pittsburg: George D. Brewer and W. T. Sears (1914-1923)

== Louisiana ==
- Socialist Light, Shreveport (1913)

== Maryland ==
- Maryland Leader, Baltimore (1929-19??)

== Massachusetts ==
- Haverhill Social Democrat, Haverhill (1899-1901)
- The Revolutionary Age, Boston: Boston Local Socialist Party (1918-1919)

== Michigan ==
- Exponent, Saginaw (1900)

== Minnesota ==
- American Bolshevik, Minneapolis (1919-1919)
- Duluth Socialist, Duluth (1913-19??)
- Eye Opener, Crookston (1911-1914)
- Minnesota Social Democratic Bulletin, Minneapolis (1900-1900)
- Minnesota Socialist, Minneapolis (19??-19??)
- New Times, Minneapolis (1910-19??)
- St. Paul Labor, St. Paul (1894-1896)
- Truth, Duluth (1917-1923)

== Mississippi ==
- Grander Age, Biloxi (1895-19??)
- New Mississippi Socialist, Kilmichael (19??-19??)

== Missouri ==
- American Vanguard, St. Louis (192?-19??)
- Boston Labor, St. Louis (1893-189?)
- East St. Louis Labor, St. Louis (1894-189?)
- Joplin Socialist, Joplin (1913)
- Kansas City Labor, St. Louis (189?-189?)
- Kansas City Socialist, Kansas City (1913)
- Labor, St. Louis (1893-19??)
- Labor News, St. Louis (1893-18??)
- Lincoln Socialist-Labor, St. Louis (1895-1896)
- Louisville Labor, St. Louis (1894-189?)
- Maplewood Herald, Maplewood Station (1911-19??)
- Milwaukee Labor, St. Louis (1893-189?)
- Missouri Labor, St. Louis (18??-18??)
- Missouri Socialist, St. Louis (1901-19??)
- National Rip-Saw, St. Louis (1913)
- People’s Appeal, St. Joseph (1913)
- People’s Voice, St. Louis (1911-19??)
- Pueblo Labor, St. Louis (1893-189?)
- Scott County Kicker, Benton: Phil A. Hafner (1901-1917)
- Social Democrat, Independence (1913)
- Social Revolution, St. Louis (1917-19??)
- Troy Labor, St. Louis (1893-189?)

== Montana ==
- Anaconda Labor-Socialist, Anaconda (1903-19??)
- Butte Socialist, Butte (1915)
- Montana Socialist, Butte (1912-191?)

== Nebraska ==
- Leader, Omaha (1934-19??)
- Nebraska Worker, Lincoln (191?-19??)
- Socialist Herald, Omaha (1907-1908)
- Weekly Enterpriser, Lincoln (191?-191?)

== Nevada ==
- Ballot Box, Fallon (1913)
- Co-operative Colonist, Fallon (1916-1918)

== New Jersey ==
- Gloucester Socialist, New Jersey
- Morris County educator, Dover (191?-19??)
- Newark leader, Newark (1915-19??)

== New York ==
Front page of an early edition of the New York Evening Call. The daily launched on May 30, 1908.

- Buffalo Socialist, Buffalo (1912-19??)
- Glove City Socialist, Gloversville (1912-19??)
- Labor Action, New York (1933-1934)
- New Age, Buffalo (1912-1925)
- New Leader, New York City (1924-1940)
- New York Socialist, New York (1908-1908)
- People [dissident William Street edition], New York City (1899-1901)
  - Worker, New York City (1901-1908)
  - New York Call, New York City (1908-1923)
  - New York Leader, New York City (1923)
- Regenerator, New York (1844-18??)
- Socialist, New York (1876-1876)
- Socialist Appeal, New York (1937-1941)
- Socialist Call, New York City (1935-1947)
- Weekly People, New York (1900-1979)
- West Side Socialist News, New York (1931-????)

== Ohio ==
- Cleveland Citizen, Cleveland: Max S. Hays (1891-current)
- Cleveland Socialist, Cleveland (1911-1914)
- Miami Valley Socialist, Ohio (1912-1929)
- New Nation, Dayton (1904-19??)
- Ohio Labor, Toledo (1894-1???)
- Ohio Socialist, Cleveland (19??-19??)
- Ohio Socialist, Dayton (1903-1904)
- Ohio Socialist, Lakewood (1917-1919)
- Socialist News, Cleveland (1914-????)

== Oklahoma ==
- Age of Reason, Oklahoma City (191?-191?)
- Agitator, Sayre (1913-191?)
- American Guardian, Oklahoma City (1931-1942)
- American Socialist, Garvin (1910-191?)
- Answer, Pawnee, Oklahoma Territory (1894-1895)
- Beacon Light, Laverne, Harper County (1912-1916)
- Challenge, Medford (190?-190?)
- Clarita Enterprise, Clarita, Coal County (1910-19??)
- Commanche County Socialist, Lawton (1913)
- Common People, Stillwater (1903-1904)
- Constructive Socialist, Alva, Woods County (191?-191?)
- Ellis County Advocate, Gage, Ellis County (1918-192?)
- Ellis County Socialist, Shattuck (1914-1917)
- Goltry Eagle, Goltry, Woods County (191?-191?)
- Goltry News, Goltry, Woods County (190?-1914)
- Grady County Socialist, Chickasha (1913)
- Grant County Socialist, Medford (1912-191?)
- Hughes County Socialist, Lamar (1913)
- Industrial Democrat, Oklahoma City (1910-19??)
- Johnston County Socialist, Tishomingo (191?-191?)
- Justice, Duncan, Indian Territory (1907-1907)
- Lancet, Norman (1904-190?)
- Lincoln County Socialist, Davenport, Lincoln County, (1915-191?)
- May Record, May, Harper County, (1912-191?)
- Musings of the Old Kuss, Sayre (1915-19??)
- Muskogee County Emancipator, Muskogee (1913)
- New Century, Sulphur: H. Grady Milner (1911-1913)
- New-State Socialist, Cornish, Jefferson County, (1908-19??)
- Nowata County Plain Talk, Nowata (1913)
- Oklahoma Daily Socialist, Newkirk (1903-19??)
- Oklahoma Leader, Oklahoma City: Dan Hogan, Oscar Ameringer, Freda Ameringer (1920-1972)
- Oklahoma Pioneer, Oklahoma City (1910-191?)
- Oklahoma Socialist Bulletin, Oklahoma City (1906-19??)
- Oklahoma Socialist, Duncan, Stephens County, (1910-191?)
- Oklahoma Weekly Leader, Oklahoma City (1928-1931)
- Otter Valley Socialist, Snyder (1914-1918)
- People’s Tribune, Pawhuska, Osage Reservation (1906-19??)
- Peoples Voice, Watonga: A. L. McRill (1906)
- Pittsburgh County Hornet, McAlester (1913)
- Progressive Worker, Henryetta (1913)
- Rogers County Voice, Claremore (1912-1914)
- Sledge Hammer, Okemah (1912-191?)
- Social Democrat, Oklahoma City (191?-19??)
- Social Democrat, Sayre (1912-191?)
- Social Iconoclast, Wagoner (1913-191?)
- Socialist Antidote Independent, Mangum (1915-191?)
- Socialist Herald, Madill (1911-1912)
- Submarine, Boswell (1912-1915)
- Sunlight, Carmen (1914-191?)
- Sword of Truth, Sentinel (1912-191?)
- Tenant Farmer, Kingfisher (1912-191?)
- Tishomingo News, Tishomingo (1915-19??)
- Wagoner County Socialist, Wagoner (1913)
- Woods County Socialist, Alva (1910-191?)
- World-wide War, Pawhuska (1915-191?)
- X-Ray, Ardmore (191?-191?)
- Yale Record, Yale (1902-1965)

== Pennsylvania ==
- Free Press, New Castle: C.H. McCarty, F.M. Hartman, Charles McKeever, William J. White (1911)
- Labor Advocate, Reading, Charles A. Maurer (1900-?)
- Labor News, York, William Kelley, (1911-?)
- Lancaster County Socialist, Lancaster County, Elmer Smith (1911-?)
- Land and Labor, Altoona, F.H. Hall (1913-?)
- People’s Press, Philadelphia (1915-19??)
- Public Ownership, Erie (1900)
- Venango County Socialist, Venango County

== Rhode Island ==
- Beacon, Johnston (1897-1898)

== South Dakota ==
- Lantern, Deadwood: Freeman Knowles (1905-1910)
- Register, Central City, Black Hills (1???-19??)
- Stanley County Socialist, Wendte (1908-19??)

== Tennessee ==
- Social Democrat, Memphis (1911-1913)

== Texas ==
- Bell County Socialist, Temple (1913)
- Builder, Shreveport (1913)
- Common Sense, Tyler (1913)
- Corpus Christi Socialist, Corpus Christi (1913)
- Eye Opener, Mt. Pleasant (1913)
- Farmers' Review, Bonham (1900)
- Freestone County Truth, Teague (1913)
- Gregg County Red Ball, Longview (1913)
- Harrison County Searchlight, Marshall (1913)
- Hill County Worker, Hillsboro (1913)
- Hopkins County Red Special, Sulphur Springs (1913)
- Kaufman County Socialist, Terrell (1913)
- Labor Journal, Dallas (1900)
- Limestone County News, Thornton (1913)
- Plain Dealer, Corsicana (1913)
- Rebel, Hallettsville: T.A. Hickey (1911-1917)
- San Antonio Socialist, San Antonio (1913)
- Searchlight, Taylor (1913)
- Texarkana Socialist, Texarkana: J.C. Thompson
- Texas Republic, Paris (1900)

== Virginia ==
- Union Star, Brookneal (1912-current)

== Washington ==
Front page of the Milwaukee Leader, Jan. 3, 1920, detailing the aftermath of the Palmer Raids

- Commonwealth, Everett: Commonwealth Pub. Co. (1911-1914)
- Co-operative News, Everett (1917-19??)
- Economic Equality, Bellingham (1932-193?)
- Lewis County Clarion, Centralia (1913)
- Northwest Worker, Everett (1915-1917)
- Party Builder, Everett (1915-1919)
- Social Vanguard, Spokane (1931-19??)
- Socialist Worker, Tacoma (1913-1914)
- Truth, Tacoma (1913-1913)

== West Virginia ==
- Labor Argus, Charleston (1906-1915)
- Socialist and Labor Star, Huntington: W.H. Thompson (1911-1915)

== Wisconsin ==
- Call, Milwaukee (1939-1947)
- Social Democratic Herald, Milwaukee: Victor L. Berger (1901-1911)
  - Milwaukee Leader, Milwaukee: Victor L. Berger (1911-1938)

== Wyoming ==
- Watchman, Evanston: J.H.Ryckman (1908)

== See also ==
- Non-English press of the Socialist Party of America
- English-language press of the Communist Party USA
- Non-English press of the Communist Party USA
