= National Register of Historic Places listings in Woods County, Oklahoma =

Location of Woods County in Oklahoma

This is intended to be a complete list of the properties on the National Register of Historic Places in Woods County, Oklahoma, United States. The locations of National Register properties for which the latitude and longitude coordinates are included below, may be seen in a map.

There are 18 properties listed on the National Register in the county, and one former listing.

This National Park Service list is complete through NPS recent listings posted October 23, 2026.

== Current listings ==
	Name on the Register	Image	Date listed	Location	City or town	Description
1	21 Crossing and Ranch	21 Crossing and Ranch	June 26, 2026 (#100012778)	Address Restricted	Waynoka	
2	Alva Armory		September 8, 1988 (#88001360)	Choctaw and 3rd Sts. 36°48′24″N 98°39′40″W	Alva	
3	Branson Building		January 5, 1984 (#84000700)	531 Barnes St. 36°48′12″N 98°40′01″W	Alva	
4	Building at 405–407 College Avenue		January 5, 1984 (#84000702)	405 College Ave. 36°48′15″N 98°40′01″W	Alva	
5	Building at 409 College Avenue		January 5, 1984 (#84000703)	409 College Ave. 36°48′15″N 98°40′01″W	Alva	
6	Building at 500 Flynn Street		January 5, 1984 (#84000704)	500 Flynn St. 36°48′18″N 98°39′55″W	Alva	
7	Central National Bank	Central National Bank	January 5, 1984 (#84000705)	401 College Ave. 36°48′17″N 98°40′02″W	Alva	
8	First Congregational Church		December 4, 2017 (#100001871)	1887 E. Cecil St. 36°35′08″N 98°52′41″W	Waynoka	
9	Hotel Bell		June 14, 2013 (#13000395)	505 Barnes; 36°48′13″N 98°39′56″W	Alva	
10	I.O.O.F. Hall		January 5, 1984 (#84000706)	527 Barnes St. 36°48′12″N 98°39′59″W	Alva	Destroyed by fire in 2004.
11	Kavanaugh and Shea Building		January 5, 1984 (#84000707)	403 College Ave. 36°48′15″N 98°40′01″W	Alva	
12	Nickel Ensor McClure House		September 3, 2010 (#10000623)	1301 Locust St. 36°48′00″N 98°40′41″W	Alva	
13	Ranger Theater		July 2, 2026 (#100013090)	416 Flynn Street; 36°48′18″N 98°39′52″W	Alva	
14	Science Hall		July 14, 1983 (#83002141)	Northwestern Oklahoma State University campus 36°47′48″N 98°40′06″W	Alva	
15	Stine Building		April 21, 1982 (#82003717)	601 Barnes St. 36°48′12″N 98°40′00″W	Alva	
16	Turkey Springs Battlefield		June 5, 2025 (#100011885)	36°54′N 99°00′W	Freedom vicinity	Site of the Battle of Turkey Springs.
17	Waynoka Santa Fe Depot and Harvey House		June 20, 1974 (#74001671)	Along the former Santa Fe railroad tracks 36°35′00″N 98°52′59″W	Waynoka	
18	Waynoka Telephone Exchange Building		September 10, 2014 (#14000597)	200 S. Main St. 36°35′01″N 98°52′49″W	Waynoka	

== Former listings ==
	Name on the Register	Image	Date listed	Date removed	Location	City or town	Description
1	Alva Municipal Swimming Pool and Bathhouse		December 13, 2022 (#100008455)	January 29, 2025	1402 Flynn St. 36°48′19″N 98°40′50″W	Alva	

== See also ==
- List of National Historic Landmarks in Oklahoma
- National Register of Historic Places listings in Oklahoma
