= Little Sahara State Park =

State park in Oklahoma, United States

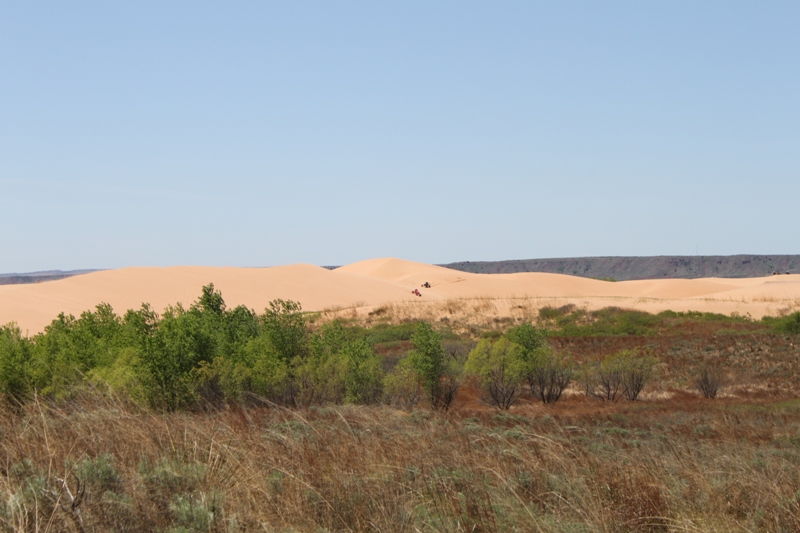
- Dunes in Little Sahara State Park

- Location within Oklahoma
- Location: Woods County, Oklahoma, United States
- Nearest city: Waynoka, OK
- Coordinates: 36°31′59″N 98°52′55″W
- Area: 1,600 acres (6.5 km^{2})
- Established: 1960
- Visitors: 138,230 (in 2021)
- Governing body: Oklahoma Tourism and Recreation Department
- Website: www.travelok.com/listings/view.profile/id.4581

Little Sahara State Park, also called Waynoka Dunes is a state park located in Woods County, Oklahoma, named for its resemblance to the Sahara Desert. The vast dunes have formed over time from terrace deposits, remnants of prehistoric times when the Cimarron River flowed over the entire area.

== Park History ==
Little Sahara was founded in the early 1950s as a city park by Grace Ward Smith, head of Alva's Chamber of Commerce. Prior to that, the dunes were primarily seen as a nuisance, encroaching on Highway 281, requiring the road to be re-routed. Smith named the park to lure visitors, hired locals to guide and act as outlaws, and in 1958 purchased a pair of camels. In September 1960, the state of Oklahoma purchased the 339 acre parcel for $12,500. Later that year, 4,000 visitors viewed a Christmas pageant starring the camels. By 1963, the park had expanded to 1,600 acres. That spring, a local auto dealer rode the dunes in a "makeshift steampunk vehicle with wide rims and balloon tires, topped by hay-rake wheels serving as roll bars." This activity quickly gained popularity and local businesses continue to offer rentals.

== Park Description ==
The park is open year-round and no permits are required to enter. Little Sahara State Park is located in northwest Oklahoma, south of Waynoka. The park offers over 1600 acres of rideable sand dunes ranging in height from 25 feet (7.6 m) to 75 ft (23 m). (Note: The Rider Planet website showed the dune area as 1800 acres.) The tallest dunes, named "Competition Hill" and "Buttercup" are in the western and northwestern section of the dunes.

Vehicles allowed include motorcycles, dirt bikes, ATVs, UTVs and SXS, SUVs and Jeeps. Vehicles must display solid orange whip flags, 6-inch by 12-inch (with no writing). Dune buggies and 4x4 vehicles must have seat belts and a roll bar. MX Riders and operators under 18 years old are required to wear a helmet (which Rider Planet strongly recommends for riders of all ages).

Amenities include showers, picnic areas, 86 RV hookups with electric/water and 143 tent sites. Seasonal concessions provide refreshment, and fuel and grocery are located nearby.
