= KRDR =

KRDR may refer to:

- KRDR (FM), a radio station (105.7 FM) licensed to serve Alva, Oklahoma, United States
- KCEI, a radio station (90.1 FM) licensed to serve Red River, New Mexico, United States, which held the call sign KRDR from 1997 to 2012
- Grand Forks Air Force Base (ICAO code KRDR)
