= KALV =

KALV may refer to:

- KALV (AM), a radio station (1430 AM) licensed to serve Alva, Oklahoma, United States
- KALV-FM, a radio station (101.5 FM) licensed to serve Phoenix, Arizona, United States
