= Waynoka station =

- Waynoka Santa Fe Depot and Harvey House
- U.S. National Register of Historic Places
- Location within Oklahoma
- Location: Santa Fe Tracks, Waynoka, Oklahoma
- Coordinates: 36°35′00″N 98°52′59″W
- Area: less than one acre
- Built: 1910
- NRHP reference No.: 74001671
- Added to NRHP: June 20, 1974

The Waynoka Santa Fe Depot and Harvey House in Waynoka, Oklahoma are substantial brick buildings from 1910 built for the Atchison, Topeka and Santa Fe Railway ("Santa Fe"). The Harvey House operated from 1910 to 1937, and was renovated to serve as a dormitory and reading room for train crewmen. The Depot was a stop for the San Francisco Chief. It was listed on the National Register of Historic Places listings in Woods County, Oklahoma in 1974.

The depot building is 84 by 22 feet (25.6 m × 6.7 m) in plan. The Harvey House building is H-shaped in plan.
