= Herbert D. Smith =

American lawyer

Herb Smith
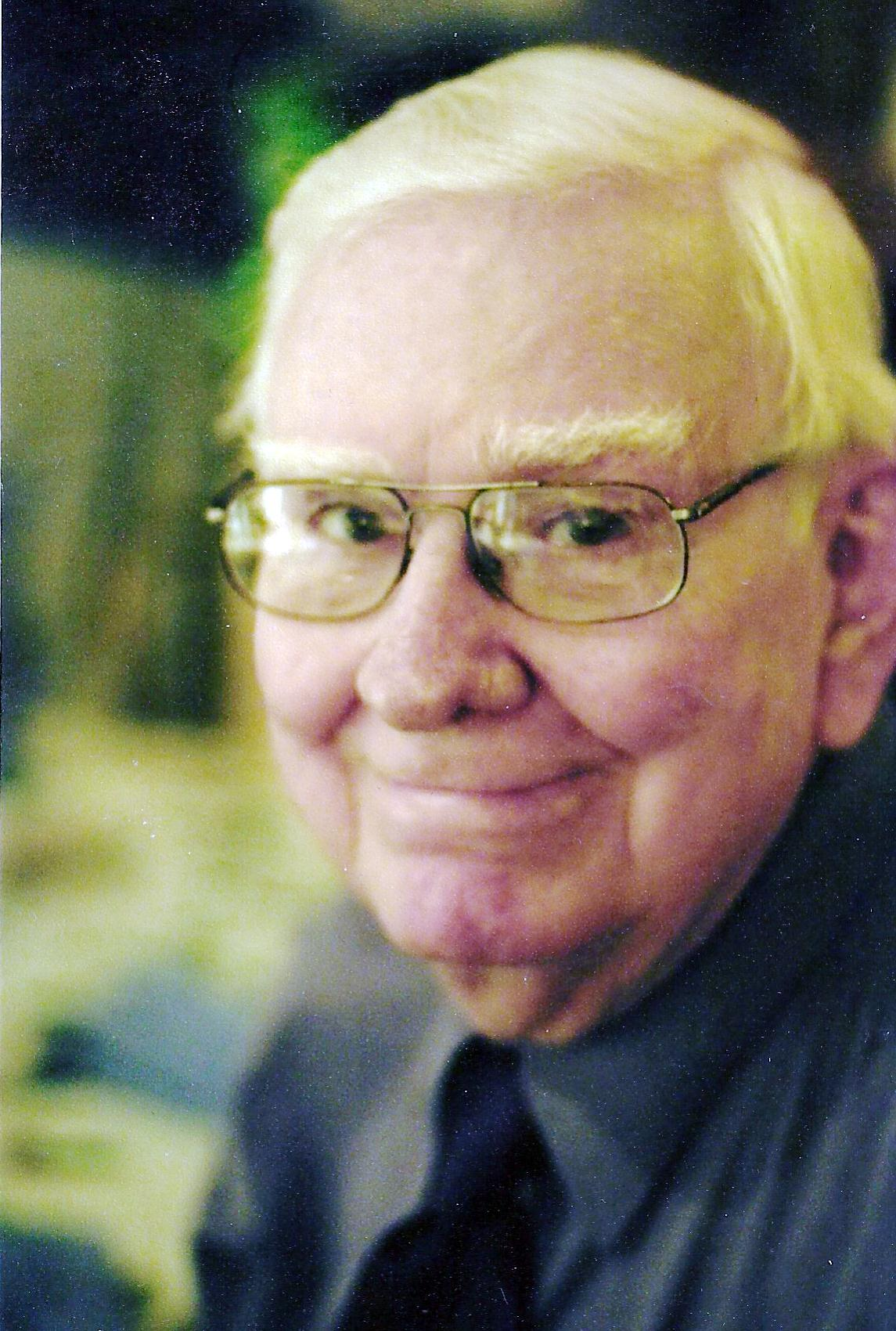
- A portrait of Herbert D. Smith
- Born: Herbert Dwight Smith; February 10, 1926; Alva, Oklahoma, US
- Died: July 1, 2011 (aged 85); Enid, Oklahoma, US
- Occupation: Attorney
- Years active: 1958–2011

Herbert Dwight Smith (February 10, 1926 – July 1, 2011) was an attorney in Alva, Oklahoma for over fifty years. He was elected to the Oklahoma House of Representatives in 1954 on the Democratic ticket and served one term representing Woods County, serving on the Enrolling and Engrossing Bills Committee as Co-Chair.

== Education ==
Smith attended Northwestern briefly, before joining the U.S. Army. The Army provided some education at Baylor University, but eventually he was sent overseas to Germany during World War II. After being sent to Fitzsimmons Hospital, he returned home and enrolled at the University of Oklahoma, obtaining his Chemical Engineering degree in 1950. Smith enrolled at the University of Oklahoma in the School of Law in 1955.

== War experience ==
Smith served as a corporal in the Infantry Co. G 232nd Inf. 42nd Div. World War II. He and his troops were captured in Germany's Black Forest, and he was a prisoner of war confined to Stalag No. IV-B for 108 days. He was eventually liberated by the Russians. His Honorable Discharge states he received the following Decorations and Citations: European-African-Middle Eastern Campaign Medal, American Theater Medal, World War II Victory Medal, and Good Conduct Medal. In November, 1988, he received his Prisoner of War Medal. His battles and campaigns were Rhineland (GO 40 WD45) Central Europe (G0 40 WD45).

== Political and law career ==
Smith was elected to the Oklahoma House of Representatives in 1954 on the Democratic ticket and served one term serving on the Enrolling and & Engrossing Bills Committee as Co-Chair. He was a member of the Oklahoma Bar Association and the American Bar Association and had served as Acting County Attorney, Acting County Judge and Alva City Attorney. In 2008, Herb received his 50 year pin from the Oklahoma Bar Association.

== Membership ==
He has served as Worshipful Master of the Masonic Lodge, And was a past Commander of the American Legion, a past member of the Alva Planning Commission and a past president of the Alva School Board.

== Personal life ==
Smith married Gerree Coley in 1955, and had three children. He died on July 1, 2011.
