= KZLF =

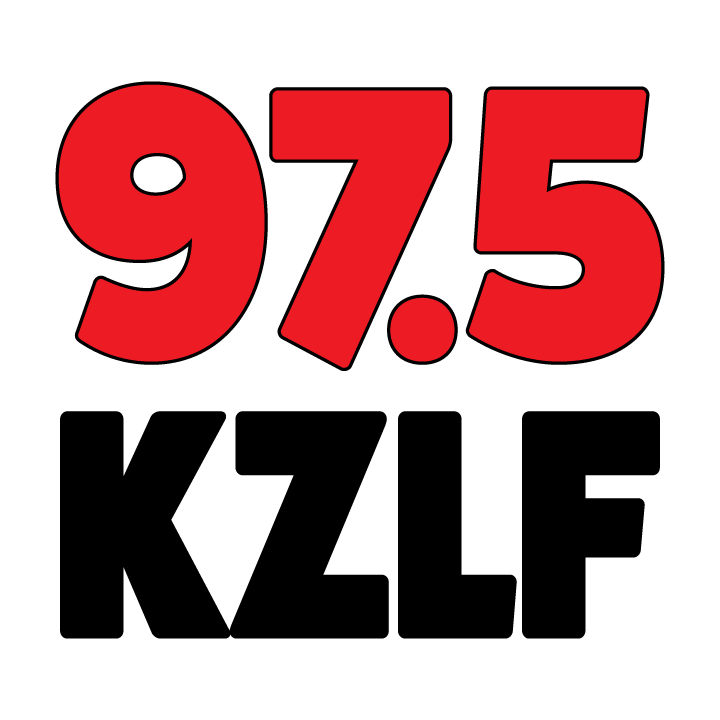
- 97.5 KZLF Logo
- Alva, Oklahoma; United States
- Frequency: 97.5 MHz
- Branding: 97.5 KZLF

Programming
- Format: Classic hits
- Affiliations: Fox News Radio

Ownership
- Owner: Running Wolf Radio LLC

History
- First air date: 2004
- Former call signs: KPAK (2002–2022)

Technical information
- Licensing authority: FCC
- Facility ID: 85771
- Class: C2
- ERP: 50,000 watts
- HAAT: 150 meters (490 ft)
- Transmitter coordinates: 37°01′27″N 98°41′22″W

Links
- Public license information: Public file; LMS
- Webcast: Listen Live
- Website: 975kzlf.com

KZLF (97.5 FM "97.5 KZLF") is a radio station broadcasting a classic hits music format licensed to Alva, Oklahoma, United States. The station is currently owned by Running Wolf Radio LLC, which purchased it from George S. Flinn, Jr. in 2022.

KZLF broadcasts local news weekdays at 20 minutes past the hour and accurate weather forecasts 7 days a week at 30 minutes past the hour. The station allows its listeners to make song requests autonomously via its website.
