= Stine Building =

- U.S. National Register of Historic Places
- Location within Oklahoma Location within the United States
- Location: 601 Barnes St., Alva, Oklahoma
- Coordinates: 36°48′12″N 98°40′00″W
- Area: less than one acre
- Built: 1906
- NRHP reference No.: 82003717
- Added to NRHP: April 21, 1982

The Stine Building, located at 601 Barnes St. in Alva, Oklahoma, was built in 1906. It was listed on the National Register of Historic Places in 1982.

It is a two-story brick structure, which is "one of the best built downtown commercial structures". It has served as "a steady anchor for the county seat's business district." It is named for J.A. Stine, its owner and a civic leader of Alva. Stine came from Pennsylvania to Alva in 1894, and served as its mayor when it became a city in 1901.
