= Branson Building =

- U.S. National Register of Historic Places
- Location within Oklahoma Location within the United States
- Location: 531 Barnes St., Alva, Oklahoma
- Coordinates: 36°48′12″N 98°40′1″W
- Area: less than one acre
- Built: 1905
- Architectural style: Plains Commercial
- MPS: Territorial Buildings in Downtown Alva TR
- NRHP reference No.: 84000700
- Added to NRHP: January 5, 1984

The Branson Building in Alva, Oklahoma is a Plains Commercial-style building which was built in 1905. It was listed on the National Register of Historic Places in 1984.

It is a two-story business block, with a flat roof bordered by a brick frieze. Second-story windows are framed by pilasters; first-story windows are tall, consistent with the high (15 feet (4.6 m)) ceilings inside. There is a corner entrance on the diagonal.
