= Alva Regional Airport =

- IATA: none; ICAO: KAVK; FAA LID: AVK

Summary
- Airport type: Public
- Owner: City of Alva
- Operator: Derrick Courson
- Serves: Alva, Oklahoma
- Elevation AMSL: 1,477 ft (450 m)
- Coordinates: 36°46′25″N 098°40′13″W
- Website: www.AlvaOK.gov/...

Map
- Location of airport in Oklahoma AVK (the United States)

Runways
Direction	Length		Surface
Direction	ft	m	Surface
18/36	5,001	1,524	Concrete
9/27	1,390	424	Turf

Statistics (2019)
- Aircraft operations (year ending 5/28/2019): 6,520
- Based aircraft: 36
- Source: Federal Aviation Administration

Alva Regional Airport (ICAO: KAVK, FAA LID: AVK) is a city-owned, public-use airport located two nautical miles (4 km) south of the central business district of Alva, a city in Woods County, Oklahoma, United States. It is included in the National Plan of Integrated Airport Systems for 2011–2015, which categorized it as a general aviation facility.

Although most U.S. airports use the same three-letter location identifier for the FAA and IATA, this airport is assigned AVK by the FAA, but has no designation from the IATA (which assigned AVK to Arvaikheer Airport in Arvaikheer, Mongolia).

== Facilities and aircraft ==
Alva Regional Airport covers an area of 850 acres (344 ha) at an elevation of 1,477 feet (450 m) above mean sea level. It has two runways: 18/36 is 5,001 by 75 feet (1,524 x 23 m) with a concrete surface and 9/27 is 1,390 by 170 foot (424 x 52 m) turf runway.

For the 12-month period ending May 28, 2019, the airport had 6,520 general aviation aircraft operations, an average of 125 per week. At that time there were 36 aircraft based at this airport: 32 single-engine, 1 multi-engine, 2 jet, and 1 helicopter.

== See also ==
- List of airports in Oklahoma
