= Waynoka, Oklahoma =

- City
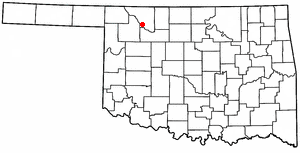
- Location of Waynoka, Oklahoma
- Coordinates: 36°34′56″N 98°52′47″W
- Country: United States
- State: Oklahoma
- County: Woods

Area
  - Total: 1.00 sq mi (2.60 km^{2})
  - Land: 1.00 sq mi (2.60 km^{2})
  - Water: 0 sq mi (0.00 km^{2})
- Elevation: 1,493 ft (455 m)

Population (2020)
  - Total: 708
  - Density: 705.4/sq mi (272.37/km^{2})
- Time zone: UTC-6 (Central (CST))
  - Summer (DST): UTC-5 (CDT)
- ZIP code: 73860
- Area code: 580
- FIPS code: 40-79350
- GNIS feature ID: 1099446
- Website: www.waynokaok.org

Waynoka is a city in Woods County, Oklahoma, United States. It is located on U.S. Highway 281 and State Highway 14, seventy miles west of Enid. The population, which peaked at 2,018 in 1950, was 708 at the time of the 2020 Census.

== History ==
=== Founding years ===
Founded in what was then known as Indian Territory, Waynoka was established in 1887 when the Southern Kansas Railroad, a subsidiary of the Atchison, Topeka and Santa Fe Railway, built a rail line through the area. Shortly thereafter, on April 10, 1888, a post office was established, having the distinction of being the first to be established in the Cherokee Outlet. Its economy was based on the railroad and the large ranches in the area. When the Cherokee Outlet opened up for non-Indian settlement in the land run of September 16, 1893, Waynoka became the area's agricultural trade center.

=== Transportation Center ===
The Santa Fe Railway made the city a major railroad center when it built Oklahoma's largest rail yard in Waynoka. Ultimately employing a thousand machinists, boilermakers, sheet metal mechanics, fire builders, car men, switchmen, and engineers, it operated twenty-four hours a day. One of the nation's largest ice plants was built to supply ice for refrigerator cars hauling perishables on Santa Fe's main line from Chicago to Los Angeles. In addition, a roundhouse, maintenance and repair shops, a reading room, a depot, and a Harvey House were built by the railroad. Although the railroad eventually moved its maintenance operations from Waynoka, it continued train crew changes there until 1986. At the turn of the twenty-first century, between fifty and one hundred trains still passed daily through Waynoka on Oklahoma's fastest and busiest rail line.

Waynoka was also the starting point of the Buffalo and Northwestern Railroad, a 52-mile line linking to Buffalo, Oklahoma, the Harper County seat. The line was finished in 1920, and acquired by the Santa Fe the same year. However, the Santa Fe abandoned the line in 1982.

The predecessor company of TWA, Transcontinental Air Transport, known as "TAT", built Oklahoma's first airport for Transcontinental in 1929 in Waynoka, at a site five miles northeast of town selected by Charles Lindbergh himself. TAT offered passengers coast-to-coast travel in forty-eight hours, and Waynoka was an important stop on the pioneering route. For the service, TAT utilized not only its own Ford Trimotor aircraft, but also Pullman sleeper cars of the Pennsylvania Railroad and the Santa Fe Railroad for the two overnight segments of the long trip. It was at Waynoka that passengers would transfer from the TAT airplane to the Santa Fe train (going westbound), or conversely, from the Santa Fe train to the TAT plane (heading eastbound). Both Lindbergh and Amelia Earhart, as officers in the company, reportedly became familiar faces in town. After losing $2.7 million in its first eighteen months of operation, TAT in October 1930 merged with Western Air Express to become Transcontinental and Western Airlines, which announced a new route from Kansas City, Kansas, by way of Tulsa, Oklahoma. This ended operations at Waynoka.

Waynoka is linked by US Route 281.

The current Waynoka Municipal Airport (FAA Identifier: 1K5) is one mile southeast of town, and features a paved 3532’ x 60’ runway.

== Geography ==
According to the United States Census Bureau, the city has a total area of 1.0 square mile (2.6 km^{2}), all land.

Little Sahara State Park is 4 miles (6.4 km) south of the city. The park offers over 1,600 acres (6.5 km^{2}) of rideable sand dunes ranging in height from 25 to 75 feet (23 m).

=== Climate ===
Climate data for Waynoka, Oklahoma (1991–2020)
Month	Jan	Feb	Mar	Apr	May	Jun	Jul	Aug	Sep	Oct	Nov	Dec	Year
Mean daily maximum °F (°C)	48.5 (9.2)	52.5 (11.4)	62.1 (16.7)	71.8 (22.1)	80.9 (27.2)	90.4 (32.4)	95.9 (35.5)	93.8 (34.3)	86.1 (30.1)	73.8 (23.2)	60.6 (15.9)	49.5 (9.7)	72.2 (22.3)
Daily mean °F (°C)	35.4 (1.9)	38.9 (3.8)	48.3 (9.1)	57.6 (14.2)	68.0 (20.0)	78.0 (25.6)	83.1 (28.4)	81.0 (27.2)	72.8 (22.7)	59.8 (15.4)	46.9 (8.3)	36.8 (2.7)	58.9 (14.9)
Mean daily minimum °F (°C)	22.2 (−5.4)	25.3 (−3.7)	34.5 (1.4)	43.5 (6.4)	55.2 (12.9)	65.6 (18.7)	70.3 (21.3)	68.1 (20.1)	59.5 (15.3)	45.7 (7.6)	33.2 (0.7)	24.1 (−4.4)	45.6 (7.6)
Average precipitation inches (mm)	0.81 (21)	0.98 (25)	1.95 (50)	2.37 (60)	4.06 (103)	4.16 (106)	3.48 (88)	3.39 (86)	2.05 (52)	2.68 (68)	1.20 (30)	1.09 (28)	28.22 (717)
Average snowfall inches (cm)	2.0 (5.1)	2.2 (5.6)	2.0 (5.1)	0.0 (0.0)	0.0 (0.0)	0.0 (0.0)	0.0 (0.0)	0.0 (0.0)	0.0 (0.0)	0.0 (0.0)	0.2 (0.51)	2.9 (7.4)	9.3 (23.71)
Source: NOAA

== Demographics ==
Historical population
Census	Pop.	Note	%±
1910	1,160		—
1920	1,500		29.3%
1930	1,840		22.7%
1940	1,584		−13.9%
1950	2,018		27.4%
1960	1,794		−11.1%
1970	1,444		−19.5%
1980	1,377		−4.6%
1990	947		−31.2%
2000	993		4.9%
2010	927		−6.6%
2020	708		−23.6%
U.S. Decennial Census

=== 2020 census ===
As of the 2020 census, Waynoka had a population of 708. The median age was 42.6 years. 23.4% of residents were under the age of 18 and 18.8% of residents were 65 years of age or older. For every 100 females there were 102.9 males, and for every 100 females age 18 and over there were 98.5 males age 18 and over.

0% of residents lived in urban areas, while 100.0% lived in rural areas.

There were 326 households in Waynoka, of which 27.3% had children under the age of 18 living in them. Of all households, 38.7% were married-couple households, 26.4% were households with a male householder and no spouse or partner present, and 26.4% were households with a female householder and no spouse or partner present. About 37.5% of all households were made up of individuals and 19.9% had someone living alone who was 65 years of age or older.

There were 539 housing units, of which 39.5% were vacant. Among occupied housing units, 70.6% were owner-occupied and 29.4% were renter-occupied. The homeowner vacancy rate was 8.0% and the rental vacancy rate was 23.8%.

Racial composition as of the 2020 census
Race	Percent
White	84.6%
Black or African American	0.4%
American Indian and Alaska Native	2.5%
Asian	0%
Native Hawaiian and Other Pacific Islander	0%
Some other race	3.1%
Two or more races	9.3%
Hispanic or Latino (of any race)	6.8%

=== 2000 census ===
As of the census of 2000, there were 993 people, 453 households, and 252 families residing in the city. The population density was 1,034.0 inhabitants per square mile (399.2/km^{2}). There were 582 housing units at an average density of 606.0 per square mile (234.0/km^{2}). The racial makeup of the city was 92.65% White, 2.32% African American, 1.51% Native American, 1.01% from other races, and 2.52% from two or more races. Hispanic or Latino of any race were 5.14% of the population.

There were 453 households, out of which 22.1% had children under the age of 18 living with them, 44.6% were married couples living together, 8.8% had a female householder with no husband present, and 44.2% were non-families. 42.6% of all households were made up of individuals, and 24.3% had someone living alone who was 65 years of age or older. The average household size was 2.07 and the average family size was 2.84.

In the city, the population was spread out, with 22.6% under the age of 18, 7.5% from 18 to 24, 22.4% from 25 to 44, 22.2% from 45 to 64, and 25.5% who were 65 years of age or older. The median age was 43 years. For every 100 females, there were 84.2 males. For every 100 females age 18 and over, there were 79.3 males.

The median income for a household in the city was $20,708, and the median income for a family was $28,833. Males had a median income of $24,063 versus $16,731 for females. The per capita income for the city was $12,493. About 13.5% of families and 16.6% of the population were below the poverty line, including 26.8% of those under age 18 and 9.5% of those age 65 or over.

== Notable places and events ==
Waynoka is the home to the Cimarron River Stampede, a rodeo held annually since 1936. It is held on the second weekend of August.

The passenger and freight railroad stations originally built by the Santa Fe remain intact. The Waynoka Santa Fe Depot and Harvey House is listed on the National Register of Historic Places listings in Woods County, Oklahoma.

Other NRHP-listed locations in town are the First Congregational Church at 1887 E. Cecil St., and the Waynoka Telephone Exchange Building at 200 S. Main St.
