= KALV (AM) =

- Alva, Oklahoma; United States
- Frequency: 1430 kHz
- Branding: Big Country 99.5 and Stereo 1430 KALV

Programming
- Format: Progressive country
- Affiliations: Oklahoma News Network; First OK AG Network

Ownership
- Owner: Ben Buckland; (Remember Radio, LLC)

History
- First air date: October 18, 1956
- Former call signs: DKALV (2006–2007)
- Call sign meaning: Alva

Technical information
- Licensing authority: FCC
- Facility ID: 43280
- Class: B
- Power: 500 watts
- Transmitter coordinates: 36°49′6″N 98°38′38″W
- Translator: 99.5 K258GZ (Alva)

Links
- Public license information: Public file; LMS
- Webcast: Listen live
- Website: www.kalvradio.com

KALV (1430 AM) is a commercial radio station licensed to Alva, Oklahoma, United States. The station, established in 1956, is currently owned by Ben Buckland, through licensee Remember Radio, LLC.

KALV broadcasts a progressive country format of new and classic country with state news from the Oklahoma News Network and agriculture news from First OK AG. Weekend shows include Red Steagall's Cowboy Corner and the Sunday Night KALV Sock Hop.

== Translators ==
Broadcast translator for KALV
Call sign	Frequency	City of license	FID	ERP (W)	HAAT	Class	FCC info
K258GZ	99.5 FM	Alva, Oklahoma	203242	250	146 m (479 ft)	D	LMS
