= First Congregational Church (Waynoka, Oklahoma) =

Historic church in Oklahoma, United States

- U.S. National Register of Historic Places
- Location within Oklahoma
- Location: 1887 E. Cecil St., Waynoka, Oklahoma
- Coordinates: 36°35′08″N 98°52′41″W
- NRHP reference No.: 100001871
- Added to NRHP: December 4, 2017

The First Congregational Church at 1887 E. Cecil St. in Waynoka, Oklahoma was listed on the National Register of Historic Places in 2017.

It was deemed "significant as an excellent local example of the late 19th- and 20th-century Revival style. The church building is a subtle combination of the Mission and Late Gothic Revival styles."
