= KRDR (FM) =

- Alva, Oklahoma; United States
- Frequency: 105.7 MHz
- Branding: 105.7 KRDR

Programming
- Format: Classic hits

Ownership
- Owner: Blue Sky Media, LLC

Technical information
- Licensing authority: FCC
- Facility ID: 190420
- Class: C2
- ERP: 50,000 watts
- HAAT: 150 metres (490 ft)
- Transmitter coordinates: 36°47′6″N 98°33′1″W

Links
- Public license information: Public file; LMS
- Webcast: Listen Live
- Website: alvaradio.com

KRDR (105.7 FM) is a radio station licensed to serve the community of Alva, Oklahoma. The station is owned by Blue Sky Media, LLC. It airs a classic hits format.

The station was assigned the KRDR call letters by the Federal Communications Commission on November 15, 2012.
