= American Appeal =

Weekly communist newspaper in Chicago (1926–1927)

- Type: Weekly newspaper
- Publisher: Socialist Party of America
- Founded: 1926
- Ceased publication: 1927
- Political alignment: Socialism
- Language: English
- Headquarters: Chicago
- OCLC number: 20772748

American Appeal was a weekly socialist newspaper that was published briefly in Chicago between 1926 and 1927. The paper was semi-official organ of the Socialist Party of America which was the publisher. The editor was Eugene V. Debs. In 1927 the paper merged with New Leader.
