= The Alaska Socialist =

American socialist newspaper

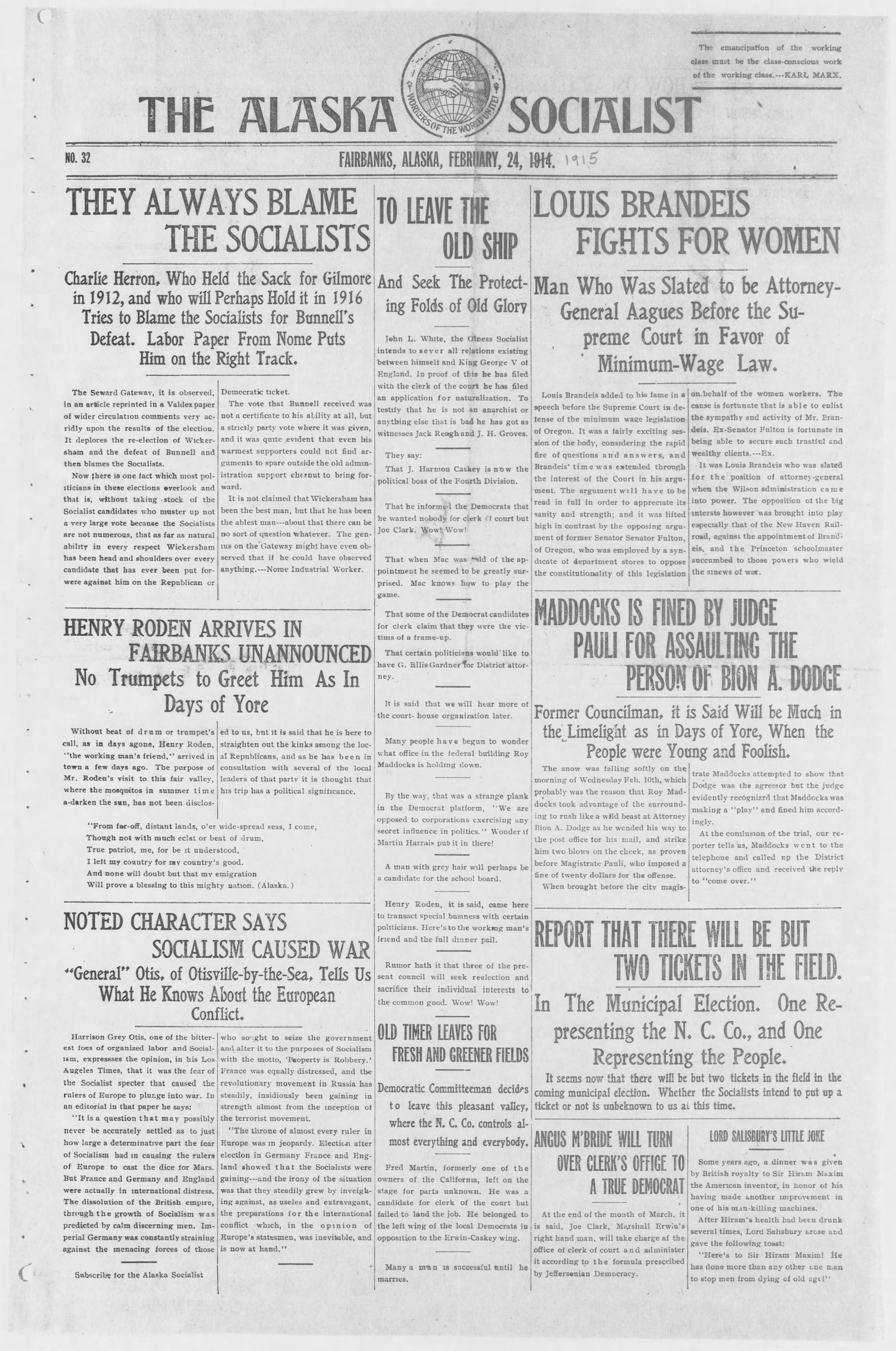
- February 24, 1915, front page
- Type: Newspaper
- Publisher: Socialist Publishing Company
- Editor: Lena Morrow Lewis; Andrew Knowles (1914); Bion Dodge (1914–1915)
- Founded: 1913
- Ceased publication: 1915
- City: Fairbanks, Alaska
- Country: United States
- ISSN: 2771-2532
- OCLC number: 34775168

The Alaska Socialist was an American semi-monthly newspaper published in Fairbanks, Alaska. After moving to Alaska following a scandal, Lena Morrow Lewis established the paper in 1913. Its first issue was published on September 29, 1913, and was associated with the Socialist Party of America. In April 1914, following elections in Fairbanks, a man named Andrew Knowles seized editorship over The Alaska Socialist from Lewis, cut ties with the Socialist Party, and began heavily criticizing Lewis. Under Knowles, the paper also feuded with publisher George Hinton Henry, who accused Knowles of falsifying stories and personally attacking Lewis. In November 1914, Bion Dodge became editor of the paper, and in February 1915, it published its final issue.

== History ==
In 1913, American socialist and activist Lena Morrow Lewis moved to Alaska following a scandal where she was accused of being in a romantic relationship with J. Mahlon Barnes, the national secretary of the Socialist Party of America. Several Alaskan residents at the time had advocated for a newspaper dedicated to the working class. As a result, shortly after moving there, Lewis founded The Alaska Socialist in order to teach and promote socialism in Alaska. The paper itself stated that it was published to support Alaska's working class and advocate for "political and industrial action." The paper printed its first issue on September 29, 1913. It was published by the Socialist Publishing Company. Although its intended schedule was semi-monthly, its issues were often published irregularly. Reporters for The Alaska Socialist included a politician, two former detectives, a former preacher, and several working-class people.

In April 1914, following elections in Fairbanks, socialist politician Andrew Knowles seized editorial control over The Alaska Socialist from Lewis. Under his control, Knowles alleged that John M. Brooks, who was elected to be the Socialist Party's candidate for Alaska Territory's delegate to the United States Congress, had not won the election. But rather, a miner named Dan McCabe did. Knowles further claimed that Lewis had conspired with Brooks in order to win the election, calling the supposed partnership the "Lewis-Brooks Machine." He also referred to Brooks as a "Seattle carpetbagger," despite having first arrived in Alaska in 1897. Also in April 1914, Lewis was accused by a socialist group in Olnes, a mining town north of Fairbanks, of having "sneaked into Fairbanks" and attempting to take control of the Socialist Party's structure. The group further claimed that she conspired with several of her allies to abandon "the principles of Socialism" and humiliate Tamanend politicians. Lastly, the Olnes group alleged that Lewis had only organized one faction of the Socialist Party, despite raising funds from fellow party members to establish several. As a result, The Alaska Socialist severed all connections to the Socialist Party and declared itself as an "independent Socialist paper devoted to political and industrial action."

The Alaska Socialist was often in feuds with The Free Press and The Socialist Press, both ran by a publisher named George Hinton Henry. In April 1914, Henry accused Knowles of falsifying stories and personally attacking Lewis. The Alaska Socialist responded three days later by insulting Henry, calling him a "would-be-editor" and an "outcast." The Alaska Socialist was condemned by several local socialist groups, including the Socialists of Fairbanks and Socialists of the Fourth Division, the latter of which described the publication as "pseudo-Socialist" and claimed that Knowles was an expelled member of the Socialist Party. In November 1914, Bion Dodge, a former assistant district attorney, became The Alaska Socialist's new editor. It published its final issue on February 24, 1915. The Fairbanks chapter of the Socialist Party was disestablished roughly that year.
