= Alva Review-Courier =

- Type: Weekly newspaper
- Format: Tabloid
- Owner: Martin Broadcasting
- Publisher: Marione Martin
- Editor: Marione Martin
- Language: English
- Headquarters: Alva, Oklahoma
- Circulation: 11,300
- Website: alvareviewcourier.com

The Alva Review-Courier is a weekly newspaper for Alva, Oklahoma, and surrounding areas. The newspaper was purchased in 1990 by Martin Broadcasting Corporation. The President was Lynn L. Martin and the vice-president was Marione E. Martin. In 2023, the Publisher and Editor was Marione Martin.

The Alva Review-Courier is made up of two publications. The legal newspaper entered as second class matter at the U.S. Post Office is the Alva Review-Courier. It is published Fridays. A Wednesday edition is a combined publication with The Newsgram, a total market coverage product, and carries a masthead of Alva Review-Courier/Newsgram."

== History ==
The paper's name can be traced back to the 1890s. A weekly publication called the Alva Courier was published in Alva, Oklahoma, beginning in 1896 (The First 100 Years of Alva, Oklahoma states it dates back to January 21, 1897). It published from January 13, 1899, to January 23, 1903. An Alva Weekly Courier published from January 30, 1903, to January 24, 1908, and then merged with the Alva Review to become the Alva Review Courier on January 31, 1908. The Alva Review had been published from July 7, 1894, through February 6, 1908. A Alva Review Courier was published from February 13, 1908, to December 31, 1914. Three other papers are worth mentioning. An Alva Weekly News was merged with the Dacoma Herald, to become the Woods County News, which published from June 20, 1968, to May 25, 1989.

The newspapers that merged to become the Alva Courier-Review of today included the Alva Daily News, published from March 5, 1908 to December 31, 1908, and the Morning Times, published from April 7, 1912, to November 21, 1914. Both were absorbed by what became the Daily Review Courier. Published by Logan A. Wilhite and edited by Kent Eubanks, the Morning Times competed with the Alva Daily Pioneer. Eubanks also published and co-edited the Alva Courier with Walter Rossin in 1907 and The Daily Times with Harry Bardshaw in 1908. The Daily Review Courier and Daily Alva Review Courier were used off and on from August 25, 1919, through April 22, 1929. In September 1929, the paper merged with the Alva Review Courier, a daily published from April 23, 1929, through June 4, 1989. On October 1, 1985, the paper used a six-column format, standard advertising unit. The newspaper was also called the Alva Review-Courier & Woods County News from June 7, 1989, through December 13, 1989. In July 1986, it changed from an evening to morning paper, published Tuesday through Friday with a Sunday edition. The paper's current name was used beginning on December 17, 1989, until today, meaning the Alva Review-Courier has provided news coverage for more than 115 years. It absorbed both the Alva Advocate and, on June 5, 1985, the Newsgram.
