= Alva, Oklahoma =

- City
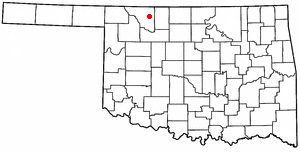
- Location of Alva within Oklahoma
- Coordinates: 36°48′21″N 98°40′04″W
- Country: United States
- State: Oklahoma
- County: Woods
- Incorporated: 1893; 133 years ago
- Named for: Alva Adams

Government
  - Type: Aldermanic
  - Mayor: Billy Joe Melton
  - City manager: Kelly Parker

Area
  - Total: 6.31 sq mi (16.33 km^{2})
  - Land: 6.31 sq mi (16.33 km^{2})
  - Water: 0 sq mi (0.00 km^{2})
- Elevation: 1,345 ft (410 m)

Population (2020)
  - Total: 5,028
  - Density: 797.5/sq mi (307.91/km^{2})
- Time zone: UTC-6 (CST)
  - Summer (DST): UTC-5 (CDT)
- ZIP code: 73717
- Area code: 580
- FIPS code: 40-01800
- GNIS ID: 2409690
- Website: www.alvaok.gov

Alva is a city in and the county seat of Woods County, Oklahoma, United States, along the Salt Fork Arkansas River. The population was 5,028 at the time of the 2020 Census, up from 4,945 at the 2010 census. The main campus of Northwestern Oklahoma State University is in Alva.

== History ==
Alva was established in 1893 as a United States General Land Office for the Cherokee Outlet land run, the largest of the land rushes that settled western and central Oklahoma. The site was chosen for its location on the Atchison, Topeka & Santa Fe Railway and likely named for a railroad attorney, Alva Adams, who had become governor of Colorado.

When the Southern Kansas Railway began extending its line from Kiowa, Kansas, across the Cherokee Outlet in 1886, Alva became the first railroad station southwest of Kiowa. The line was operational in 1887, in time for the opening of the Unassigned Lands.

The United States Secretary of the Interior chose Alva as the seat of County M when Oklahoma Territory was organized in 1890. A U.S. government land office opened there before a presidential proclamation on August 19, 1893, opened the Cherokee Outlet for general settlement. The actual land run occurred September 16, 1893. By then, Alva's 320 acres (1.3 km^{2}) site had been formally surveyed and platted.

In 1896, three years after the land run, George Cromwell and "Coal Oil Johnny" Broughan created and managed the Alva Giants, the city's first traveling baseball team including pitcher Bill McGill, who went on to join the St. Louis Browns in 1907.

Northwestern Territorial Normal School, now Northwestern Oklahoma State University ("NWOSU"), was established in 1897 in Alva by the Oklahoma Territorial Legislature.

During World War II, Alva was the site of a prisoner of war camp for German POWs. On July 19, 1943, the United States Department of War ordered that Camp Alva would be the place for the internment of the most troublesome German prisoners of war – "Nazi leaders, Gestapo agents, and extremists".

Alva is also the location of the Oklahoma Department of Corrections minimum-security Charles E. Johnson Correctional Center housing 630 male felon drug offenders.

== Geography ==
Alva is located in the northeastern quadrant of Woods County, 65 miles (105 km) northeast of Woodward, 72 miles (116 km) northwest of Enid and 119 miles (192 km) southwest of Wichita, Kansas. Its geographic coordinates are 36°48′7″N 98°39′57″W (36.801931, -98.665959). According to the United States Census Bureau, the city has a total area of 2.4 square miles (6.2 km^{2}), all land.

=== Climate ===
Alva has a humid subtropical climate (Köppen: Cfa), with cool winters and hot, sometimes sweltering, summers. At least some days every year have temperatures above 100 degrees Fahrenheit.

Climate data for Alva, Oklahoma, 1991–2020 normals, extremes 1894–present
Month	Jan	Feb	Mar	Apr	May	Jun	Jul	Aug	Sep	Oct	Nov	Dec	Year
Record high °F (°C)	85 (29)	89 (32)	99 (37)	101 (38)	106 (41)	114 (46)	120 (49)	118 (48)	115 (46)	103 (39)	92 (33)	85 (29)	120 (49)
Mean maximum °F (°C)	71.0 (21.7)	76.6 (24.8)	84.4 (29.1)	91.4 (33.0)	95.7 (35.4)	101.3 (38.5)	105.9 (41.1)	104.8 (40.4)	100.2 (37.9)	91.8 (33.2)	80.4 (26.9)	69.9 (21.1)	107.8 (42.1)
Mean daily maximum °F (°C)	47.0 (8.3)	51.5 (10.8)	61.1 (16.2)	70.7 (21.5)	80.0 (26.7)	89.9 (32.2)	95.2 (35.1)	92.6 (33.7)	86.1 (30.1)	72.8 (22.7)	59.1 (15.1)	47.7 (8.7)	71.1 (21.8)
Daily mean °F (°C)	34.8 (1.6)	38.8 (3.8)	47.8 (8.8)	57.2 (14.0)	67.9 (19.9)	77.9 (25.5)	82.9 (28.3)	80.4 (26.9)	72.9 (22.7)	59.7 (15.4)	46.7 (8.2)	36.4 (2.4)	58.6 (14.8)
Mean daily minimum °F (°C)	22.7 (−5.2)	26.0 (−3.3)	34.5 (1.4)	43.7 (6.5)	55.8 (13.2)	65.9 (18.8)	70.5 (21.4)	68.2 (20.1)	59.7 (15.4)	46.0 (7.8)	34.3 (1.3)	25.1 (−3.8)	46.0 (7.8)
Mean minimum °F (°C)	6.7 (−14.1)	9.1 (−12.7)	16.8 (−8.4)	28.1 (−2.2)	39.3 (4.1)	53.0 (11.7)	60.4 (15.8)	57.7 (14.3)	43.6 (6.4)	28.1 (−2.2)	16.8 (−8.4)	8.4 (−13.1)	1.5 (−16.9)
Record low °F (°C)	−17 (−27)	−16 (−27)	−6 (−21)	16 (−9)	25 (−4)	41 (5)	51 (11)	42 (6)	28 (−2)	10 (−12)	5 (−15)	−11 (−24)	−17 (−27)
Average precipitation inches (mm)	0.99 (25)	1.22 (31)	2.44 (62)	2.93 (74)	4.05 (103)	4.51 (115)	3.31 (84)	3.60 (91)	2.02 (51)	2.45 (62)	1.49 (38)	1.31 (33)	30.32 (769)
Average snowfall inches (cm)	2.8 (7.1)	1.7 (4.3)	2.6 (6.6)	0.0 (0.0)	0.0 (0.0)	0.0 (0.0)	0.0 (0.0)	0.0 (0.0)	0.0 (0.0)	0.0 (0.0)	0.1 (0.25)	4.1 (10)	11.3 (28.25)
Average precipitation days (≥ 0.01 in)	3.2	4.2	5.9	6.1	7.8	7.5	6.0	7.3	5.4	4.5	3.8	3.7	65.4
Average snowy days (≥ 0.1 in)	1.1	1.1	0.8	0.0	0.0	0.0	0.0	0.0	0.0	0.0	0.1	1.3	4.4
Source 1: NOAA
Source 2: National Weather Service

== Demographics ==
Historical population
Census	Pop.	Note	%±
1900	1,499		—
1910	3,688		146.0%
1920	3,913		6.1%
1930	5,121		30.9%
1940	5,055		−1.3%
1950	6,505		28.7%
1960	6,258		−3.8%
1970	7,440		18.9%
1980	6,416		−13.8%
1990	5,495		−14.4%
2000	5,288		−3.8%
2010	4,945		−6.5%
2020	5,028		1.7%
U.S. Decennial Census

=== 2020 census ===
As of the 2020 census, Alva had a population of 5,028. The median age was 31.2 years. 19.9% of residents were under the age of 18 and 18.0% of residents were 65 years of age or older. For every 100 females there were 95.6 males, and for every 100 females age 18 and over there were 90.3 males age 18 and over.

99.4% of residents lived in urban areas, while 0.6% lived in rural areas.

There were 2,011 households in Alva, of which 27.3% had children under the age of 18 living in them. Of all households, 40.6% were married-couple households, 22.5% were households with a male householder and no spouse or partner present, and 30.5% were households with a female householder and no spouse or partner present. About 35.7% of all households were made up of individuals and 14.6% had someone living alone who was 65 years of age or older.

There were 2,579 housing units, of which 22.0% were vacant. Among occupied housing units, 57.6% were owner-occupied and 42.4% were renter-occupied. The homeowner vacancy rate was 6.2% and the rental vacancy rate was 20.5%.

Racial composition as of the 2020 census
Race	Percent
White	82.7%
Black or African American	3.1%
American Indian and Alaska Native	2.5%
Asian	1.4%
Native Hawaiian and Other Pacific Islander	<0.1%
Some other race	2.7%
Two or more races	7.5%
Hispanic or Latino (of any race)	8.2%

=== 2010 census ===
As of the census of 2010, there were 4,945 people, 2,107 households, 1,134 families residing in the city. The population density was 2,100 people per square mile (810 people/km^{2}). There were 2,568 housing units at an average density of 1,110 per square mile (430/km^{2}). Self-identified white residents made up 90% of the population, with the remainder composed of 2% African American, 2.1% Native American, 1.1% Asian, less than 0.1% Pacific Islander, 2% from other races, and 2.7% from two or more races. Hispanic or Latino of any race were 4.6% of the population.

Of the 2,107 households, a quarter (24.9%) included individuals under the age of 18, 40.8% were married couples, 13.1% had a householder with no spouse present, and 46.2% were non-families. More than a third of households (36%) consisted of a single individual. Less than a quarter (13.2%) consisted of an individual age 65 or older living alone. The average household size was 2.17. The average family size was 2.86.

=== 2000 census ===
As of the census of 2000, there were 5,288 people, 2,205 households, and 1,261 families residing in the city. The population density was 2,228.6 people per square mile (860.5 people/km^{2}). There were 2,644 housing units at an average density of 1,114.3 per square mile (430.2/km^{2}). The racial makeup of the city was 94.99% White, 1.30% African American, 1.34% Native American, 0.78% Asian, 0.04% Pacific Islander, 0.23% from other races, and 1.32% from two or more races. Hispanic or Latino of any race were 1.82% of the population.

There were 2,205 households, out of which 23.9% had children under the age of 18 living with them, 46.1% were married couples living together, 8.4% had a female householder with no husband present, and 42.8% were non-families. 34.7% of all households were made up of individuals, and 16.0% had someone living alone who was 65 years of age or older. The average household size was 2.16 and the average family size was 2.81.

In the city the population was spread out, with 18.9% under the age of 18, 21.7% from 18 to 24, 20.5% from 25 to 44, 18.9% from 45 to 64, and 20.0% who were 65 years of age or older. The median age was 35 years. For every 100 females, there were 93.8 males. For every 100 females age 18 and over, there were 88.5 males.

The median income for a household in the city was $27,432, and the median income for a family was $38,041. Males had a median income of $27,531 versus $17,981 for females. The per capita income for the city was $17,966. About 9.1% of families and 17.1% of the population were below the poverty line, including 13.8% of those under age 18 and 7.0% of those age 65 or over.

== Economy ==
Agriculture has been the basis of the city's economy since it was founded. Initially, the local farms produced a variety of crops and livestock. The original 160-acre farms have mostly been consolidated into much larger units, concentrating on production of beef and wheat.

Aeronautics firm Vantage Plane Plastics, located at the airport, claims the title of "the world's largest supplier of FAA Approved interior components for most all general aviation aircraft", employing 24 people with 2016 gross sales of $3.8 Million.

In 1998 a group of local wheat farmers founded the frozen dough manufacturing facility, Value Added Products, a cooperative that in 2017 employed 83 people with an annual payroll of $2.2 Million.

Northwestern Oklahoma State University (NWOSU) is the largest employer in Alva.

Currently Alva has a city sales tax of 4.35%, the Woods County tax rate of 0.5% and a State tax rate of 4.5% for a combined tax rate of 9.25%

== Government ==
Alva has an aldermanic form of government.

== Education ==
The Alva Independent School District oversees the five public school facilities and a district office in the Alva area.

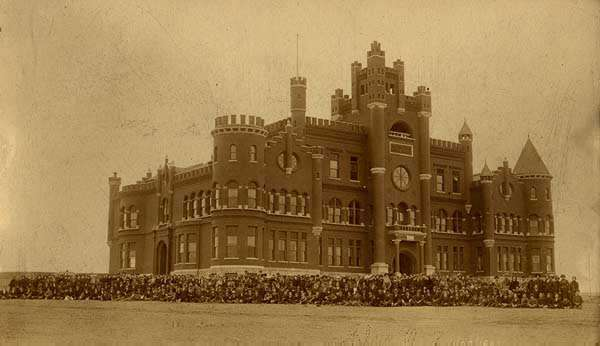
Northwestern Normal School, 1901

Alva is home to Northwestern Oklahoma State University (NWOSU), founded in 1897 as a 'Northwestern Normal School'. President James E. Ament and two teachers made up the first faculty, with classes meeting in the Congregational Church. The college's main building was built in 1899 and known as the "Castle on the Hill," a huge, fanciful brick building, modeled after a Norman castle, that towered over much of the town. The Castle burned down in 1935 and was replaced by Jesse Dunn Hall, which was dedicated in 1937 by Eleanor Roosevelt. By 1939, all of the normal schools, including Northwestern State College, offered bachelor's degrees and were reclassified as state colleges. In the 1950s, Northwestern added a fifth-year program culminating in a master's degree. In 1974, the name changed to its present 'Northwestern Oklahoma State University'. In 1996, branch campuses in Woodward and Enid expanded the university's useful service area. The university also boasts a proud tradition in athletics, competing as the Northwestern Oklahoma State Rangers in the Great American Conference. Formerly residing in the Sooner Athletic Conference in the NAIA, the Rangers made the move to NCAA Division II membership in 2012 under the direction of current university president Dr. Janet Cunningham, and former director of athletics Andrew Carter.

Northwest Technology Center is based in Alva.

== Transportation ==
U.S. Route 64 runs east–west through the center of the city, intersecting U.S. Route 281, which runs north–south. Route 281 joins Route 64 for one mile between College Boulevard (west) and Lane Boulevard (east) on Oklahoma Boulevard.

Alva Regional Airport, a 650-acre general aviation facility owned and operated by the city, is immediately south of the city on the west side of U.S. Route 281.

Alva is located on the Panhandle Subdivision of the Southern Transcon route of the BNSF Railway. This is the main transcontinental route between Los Angeles and Chicago, and carries an average of 90 freight trains per day. In January 2015 BNSF Railway announced an expansion project to add a second track between Wellington, Kansas and Avard, Oklahoma passing through Alva as part of a $175 million expansion in the South Region. By October 2018, the entire Southern Transcon was double-tracked, except for the crossing of the Salt Fork Arkansas at Alva and one other bridge; over the Missouri River at Sibley, Missouri.

== Media ==
- Alva Review-Courier - published Friday, and The Newsgram - published on Wednesday.
- KALV 1430
- KRDR 105.7
- KZLF 97.5

== Notable people ==
- Jessie Thatcher Bost (1875-1963), first female student at Oklahoma A&M university (now Oklahoma State University) moved to Alva in 1908.
- Scott Case, former NFL player.
- Jesse James Dunn, settled in Alva after 1893 Land Run; became one of the first justices named to the Oklahoma State Supreme Court.
- Lex Frieden, disability activist, was born in Alva.
- Mitchell Gale, former quarterback for Abilene Christian University and the Saskatchewan Roughriders, was born in Alva and graduated from Alva High School.
- Jack Ging, actor, was born in Alva.
- Joe L. Heaton, United States federal judge seated on the United States District Court for the Western District of Oklahoma, was born in Alva.
- Hugh Johnson, Army officer, businessman, speech writer, government official, newspaper columnist, graduated from Alva High School in 1897.
- Marilyn Mason, concert organist, was born in Alva.
- Bill McGill, former Major League Baseball player with St. Louis Browns.
- Lester Raymer, multidisciplinary artist
- Herbert D. Smith, former member of Oklahoma House of Representatives elected in 1954, was born in Alva.
- Randy Terrill, former member of Oklahoma House of Representatives, was born in Alva and graduated from Alva High School.

== In popular culture ==
- In the television series Mad Men, lead character Don Draper spends most of the penultimate episode, "The Milk and Honey Route", in Alva.

== See also ==
- National Register of Historic Places listings in Woods County, Oklahoma
- Northwestern Oklahoma State University
- Northwest Technology Center
- Alva Regional Airport
