= National Register of Historic Places listings in Atoka County, Oklahoma =

Location of Atoka County in Oklahoma

This is a list of the National Register of Historic Places listings in Atoka County, Oklahoma.

This is intended to be a complete list of the properties on the National Register of Historic Places in Atoka County, Oklahoma, United States. The locations of National Register properties for which the latitude and longitude coordinates are included below, may be seen in a map.

There are 17 properties listed on the National Register in the county. Another 4 properties were once listed but have since been removed.

This National Park Service list is complete through NPS recent listings posted October 23, 2026.

== Current listings ==
	Name on the Register	Image	Date listed	Location	City or town	Description
1	Atoka Armory	Atoka Armory	September 8, 1988 (#88001372)	Ohio and C Sts. 34°23′17″N 96°07′22″W	Atoka	
2	Isaac Billy Homestead and Family Cemetery		April 17, 1980 (#80003256)	Northeast of Daisy; 34°32′45″N 95°41′44″W	Daisy	
3	Boggy Depot Site		April 19, 1972 (#72001050)	14 miles southwest of Atoka; 34°19′13″N 96°18′51″W	Atoka	
4	Claud Collier Chevrolet & Buick Company		March 17, 2023 (#100008767)	115 East Court St. 34°23′09″N 96°07′38″W	Atoka	
5	Dunbar School	Dunbar School	June 14, 2016 (#16000369)	NE. corner of OK 3 and S. Dunbar St. 34°22′30″N 96°07′34″W	Atoka	
6	First Methodist Church Building	First Methodist Church Building	June 30, 1980 (#80003250)	105 W. 1st St. 34°23′06″N 96°07′40″W	Atoka	
7	First Oil Well in Oklahoma		April 13, 1972 (#72001053)	4 miles northeast of Wapanucka; 34°24′06″N 96°22′25″W	Wapanucka	
8	First Presbyterian Church		September 6, 2007 (#07000914)	212 E. 1st St. 34°23′02″N 96°07′35″W	Atoka	Demolished or moved
9	Indian Citizen Building		October 4, 1979 (#79001984)	115 N. Ohio Ave. 34°23′08″N 96°07′28″W	Atoka	
10	Capt. Charles LeFlore House		June 13, 1972 (#72001052)	0.5 miles north of Limestone Gap on U.S. Route 69; 34°36′17″N 95°58′33″W	Limestone Gap	
11	Masonic Temple	Masonic Temple	September 8, 1980 (#80003251)	301 Court St. 34°23′07″N 96°07′29″W	Atoka	
12	Bo McAlister Site	Bo McAlister Site	April 21, 1978 (#78002217)	Address Restricted	Wapanucka	An archaeological site
13	Middle Boggy Battlefield Site and Confederate Cemetery		April 19, 1972 (#72001051)	1 mile north of Atoka; 34°23′55″N 96°06′58″W	Atoka	
14	Old Atoka State Bank	Old Atoka State Bank	August 29, 1980 (#80003252)	Court and Ohio Sts. 34°23′06″N 96°07′29″W	Atoka	The photo does not match the NRHP nomination photo and description. The photo to the left says "Bank 1901". The nomination says 1906 and its photo is of the building on the northwest corner.
15	Pioneer Club	Pioneer Club	June 27, 1980 (#80003253)	1st and Mississippi Sts. 34°23′04″N 96°07′42″W	Atoka	
16	Joe Ralls House	Joe Ralls House	June 27, 1980 (#80003254)	303 S. Pennsylvania St. 34°22′58″N 96°07′32″W	Atoka	
17	Waddell's Station Site		April 13, 1972 (#72001054)	About 3 miles southwest of Wesley; 34°34′01″N 95°56′02″W	Wesley	

== Former listings ==
	Name on the Register	Image	Date listed	Date removed	Location	City or town	Description
1	Atoka Community Building		September 8, 1988 (#88001373)	December 29, 2005	First and Delaware Streets	Atoka	
2	Old Atoka County Courthouse	Old Atoka County Courthouse	December 6, 1979 (#79001985)	December 29, 2005	Pennsylvania and Court Streets	Atoka	
3	Captain James S. Standley House		December 11, 1979 (#79001986)	December 29, 2005	207 N. Ohio Avenue	Atoka	
4	Zweigel Hardware Store Building		September 8, 1980 (#80003255)	December 29, 2005	405 and 407 Court Street	Atoka	

== See also ==
- List of National Historic Landmarks in Oklahoma
- National Register of Historic Places listings in Oklahoma
