= McGee Creek =

McGee Creek may refer to:

- McGee Creek, California, a census designated place
- McGee Creek (Missouri), a stream in Missouri
- McGee Creek (Oklahoma), a stream in Oklahoma
- McGee Creek Reservoir, Oklahoma
- McGee Creek State Park, Oklahoma
