= Redden, Oklahoma =

Ghost town in Oklahoma, US

Redden
- Ghost town
- Location within the state of Oklahoma
- Coordinates: 34°30′23″N 95°50′41″W
- Country: United States
- State: Oklahoma
- County: Atoka
- Time zone: UTC-6 (Central (CST))
  - Summer (DST): UTC-5 (CDT)

Redden was a town located in northeastern Atoka County, Oklahoma, United States, on State Highway 43, approximately 13 miles northeast of Stringtown.

The Postal Service established a post office at Redden, Indian Territory on June 1, 1903, in what was then Atoka County, Choctaw Nation. It was named for John A. Redden (1873), a local resident who was appointed the first postmaster. The Statehood Proclamation was signed November 16, 1907. The post office at Redden, Oklahoma, was closed permanently on October 31, 1954.
