= Harmony, Oklahoma =

Unincorporated community in Oklahoma, US

Harmony is an unincorporated community to the south-east of Atoka in Atoka County, Oklahoma, United States. It is a mostly rural and farming community

Harmony has a small, K-8 school located in the community. The school was audited, as all schools are periodically, for the 2011-2012 school year.

Students of high school age either go to Atoka, Stringtown, or Tushka high schools.

Harmony is located at 34°19′00″N 96°04′32″W.

Harmony also has a country store and a volunteer fire department. The fire department has recently gotten one new truck and are expecting another within the year. This brings their total to five trucks and 12 firemen, who have recently all gone through firefighter 1 classes and two of the fireman just became state certified first responders. The fire department trains at the McAlester Army Base.

== See also ==
- Osage Reservation
- The red road
