= Chockie, Oklahoma =

Unincorporated community in Oklahoma, US

Coordinates: 34°34′55″N 95°59′54″W

Chockie (formerly Chickiechockie) is an unincorporated community 11 miles northeast of Stringtown, in Atoka County, Oklahoma, United States.

A post office was established at Chickiechockie, Indian Territory on June 17, 1891. Its name was changed to Chockie on February 8, 1904. The post office closed on March 15, 1905. The post office was three miles south of Limestone Gap. At the time of its founding, the community was located in Atoka County, Choctaw Nation.

On August 30, 1916, a nearby post office, Rich, was renamed Chockie. It was discontinued on November 30, 1934.

The community was named for Chickie and Chockie, the two daughters of Charles LeFlore. Chickie was later the wife of Lee Cruce, Oklahoma's second governor.

Singer and actress Reba McEntire lived in Chockie for a period of time.
