= Fritz Johann Hansgirg =

Austrian electrochemist and metallurgist (1891–1949)

- Born: 1891; Graz, Austria
- Died: June 23, 1949 (aged 57–58); New York City
- Education: University of Graz
- Scientific career
- Fields: Electrochemistry, metallurgy

Fritz Johann Hansgirg (1891–1949) was an Austrian electrochemist and metallurgist who in 1928 invented a carbothermic magnesium reduction process. In 1934, he left Austria for the Empire of Japan where he worked with industrialist Shitagau Noguchi to set up a magnesium plant, and then helped build a pilot plant to produce heavy water using a combined electrolysis catalytic exchange process he had invented. He moved to the United States in 1940, where he worked with industrialist Henry J. Kaiser to design a magnesium plant in California. In 1941, Hansgirg was arrested by the FBI on a presidential warrant and interned for "the duration of the war". After the war, the Soviet Union captured Hansgirg's plants in northern Korea, using the plants' processes and equipment for their atomic bomb project.

== Early life ==
Hansgirg was born in Graz, Austria in 1891 and received a PhD degree in chemistry from the University of Graz. He was married to Josephine Marie (née Heller). Heller's son from her first marriage, Peter Robert Hofstätter, graduated from the University of Vienna, and served as a military psychologist in the German army during World War II.

== Austria ==
In 1928, Hansgirg invented, and patented, a carbothermic magnesium reduction process while working in his Radenthein laboratory. This was a less costly method of mass-producing magnesium of extremely high purity. After setting up a pilot plant in Radenthein to produce magnesium, his senior partner, Emil Winter of the Pittsburgh Steel Company, urged Hansgirg to sell the patent rights to the highest bidder. This he did in 1934, and then left Austria for the Empire of Japan. The pilot plant never worked at full strength – it took a lot of accessories, and working with magnesium requires sophisticated equipment and increased caution due to the reactivity of magnesium dust.

== Empire of Japan ==
In 1934, Hansgirg arrived in the Empire of Japan where he worked with industrialist Shitagau Noguchi to set up a magnesium plant at the Chosen Nitrogen fertilizer complex in what is now the northern Korean city of Hungnam. Noguchi (through his company Nichitsu) and Winter (American Magnesium Metals corporation) established a subsidiary Japanese magnesium company. Hansgirg took the post of vice president of both American and Japanese magnesium companies, but there were problems with financing. Hansgirg's work was not limited to magnesium. In 1936, he founded a new firm Nitehiuu gemstones, because of the increased demand for jewel bearings for military purposes.

Hansgirg also developed a cracking plant, to break down crude oil into its various component parts. Before leaving Austria, he had designed two applications of a method of producing heavy water using a water gas shift reaction. It is thought that Hansgirg helped the Japanese to produce heavy water in Hungnam, and was suspected by the United States of aiding the Japanese nuclear weapon program.

== United States ==
In May 1940, Hansgirg left Japan for the United States after the political mood became "hostile to foreigners". In the United States, Hansgirg joined forces with American industrialist Henry J. Kaiser. Before the war, the demand for aircraft engineering had increased the need for light magnesium alloys. Kaiser had paid $750,000 to Winter for the patent in the carbothermic process and received government credits of about $22 million to build a plant for Permanente Metals Corporation (PMC) in California By 1941, the first unit at Kaiser's plant was producing about 5 short tons (4.5 long tons) of magnesium per day.

However, getting the Permanente plant working was dangerous and fraught with problems. The technology for the Hansgirg process was still as unreliable as it had been in Radenthein, as it required handling magnesium dust which ignites explosively in air. PMC engineers built a pilot plant to improve the process. However, instead of modifying the approach, PMC chemists found a new use for the magnesium dust. They invented a new incendiary mixture of "goop" – a paste of magnesium dust gelled with gasoline and additives, which could be used as a bomb. Government controls allowed PMC to price the "goop" in competition with napalm, and avoid large financial losses. By September 1943, only 10% of the dust was being used to produce magnesium as ingots. For the entire war period, PMC issued 20 million lbs. of magnesium and 86 million lbs. of "goop". The proportion of incendiary bombs with "goop" constituted about 8% of the total tonnage of incendiary devices used in the bombing of Japan and Germany. After the war, the Permanente plant was halted, and at the end of 1945 Kaiser repaid his credits. Nine days after the December 7, 1941, attack on Pearl Harbor plunged the United States into World War II, Hansgirg was arrested by the FBI on a presidential warrant accused of being "potentially dangerous to the public peace and safety of the United States".

After arrest, Hansgirg was first held in jail in Santa Clara County, California, and later at U.S. alien internment camps in San Antonio, Texas and Stringtown, Oklahoma.

During Hansgirg's wartime internment, U.S. attorney general Francis Biddle denied permission for his wife to visit him. Heller appealed in a hand-written woman-to-woman letter to First Lady Eleanor Roosevelt seeking leniency, explaining that her husband could not criticize Adolf Hitler because their son was still in the German army and would be retaliated against if he did so. She ended this letter by stating:

If it is within your jurisdiction to aid in reinstating my husband to his rightful place of usefulness, that his loyalty and integrity may again be recognized in this country, you may know you will have the undying gratitude of his wife.

== Black Mountain College ==
Heller's letter was forwarded by Eleanor Roosevelt to FBI director J. Edgar Hoover, who in turn consulted with the director of the alien enemy control unit. This resulted in Hansgirg being released under parole to Theodore Dreier, the treasurer of Black Mountain College, a progressive experimental educational community in North Carolina. Hansgirg was appointed as chemistry professor to replace Charles Lindsley, who took a position with the US department of defense doing research for the war department in 1942. This decision was taken on the advice of Austrian scientist Karl Terzaghi. Hansgirg's parolee sponsorship was transferred in 1943 to Dr. W. R. Wunsch, another employee at Black Mountain College, and then to Isaac Van Horn in July 1944.

At Black Mountain College, Hansgirg combined teaching of chemistry and physics with research and business activities. In 1943, an extension was added to the school's science building to make room for a photography darkroom and for Hansgirg's experiments in extracting magnesium from olivine, a locally abundant mineral. Later in the same year, he developed a modified method of magnesium production that used calcium carbide as a reducing agent. Hansgirg created and applied for patents under the name of the North Carolina Magnesium Development Corporation, and gave 20% of the shares of this business to the college.

Although many of his colleagues had fled Europe during the rise of fascism, Hansgirg was the only Black Mountain College community member with "enemy alien" status. He was known for letting the college community use his grand piano, his organ, his photographic equipment and his extensive collection of opera recordings. He was also one of the few faculty with personal wealth, and provided champagne and strawberries for special celebrations.

In September 1948, the building that housed Hansgirg's equipment and experiments burned down in a fire rumored to have been the result of a fellow faculty member's vodka still.

== Death ==
After Black Mountain College, Hansgirg moved to New York. There he worked as chief engineer for the Electro-Metal Corporation and the Bach Corporation, and provided consulting services to the Standard Oil Company of New Jersey.

On July 23, 1949, Hansgirg died unexpectedly at the age of 58. The cause of death is unknown, but is suspected to be related to his decades of ingestion of magnesium, resulting in hypermagnesemia.

== Postwar use of Hansgirg technology ==
Immediately after the war, the Soviet Union invaded and occupied northern Korea and took possession of Hansgirg's magnesium and heavy water plants in Hungnam. They transferred the technology back to Russia for integration into their own atomic bomb program. The U.S. Manhattan Project also utilized Hansgirg's electrolytic (CECE) process for heavy water production during the war and for many years thereafter. Many aspects of the postwar history related to both the U.S. and Soviet (now Russian) use of Hansgirg's processes remain classified.

== See also ==
- US 4572736 Process for producing magnesium

== Bibliography ==
- F. Hansgirg, "Thermal Reduction of Magnesium Compounds", Pt. 1, The Iron Age, Vol. 152, No. 21, pp. 52–63, November 18, 1943.
- Fritz Hansgirg, "Korea's Industrial Development", originally appeared in Korea Economic Digest (April 1945).
- Production of magnesium during carbothermal reduction of magnesium oxide by differential condensation of magnesium and alkali vapors
- Merton C. Flemings; George B. Kenney; Donald R. Sadoway; Joel P. Clark; Julian Szekely (February 1, 1981). "An Assessment of Magnesiumm Primary Production Technology: Final Report". U.S. DOE Division of Industrial Energy Conservation Via MIT Materials Processing Center: 124. doi:10.2172/6509836. OSTI 6509836.
- Yang, Cheng-bo; Tian, Yang; Qu, Tao; Yang, Bin; Xu, Bao-Qiang; Dai, Yong-Nian (December 2013). "Production of magnesium during carbothermal reduction of magnesium oxide by differential condensation of magnesium and alkali vapours". Journal of Magnesium and Alloys. 1 (4): 323–329. doi:10.1016/j.jma.2014.01.002.
