= Lake Stanley Draper =

- Location within Oklahoma Location within the United States
- Location: Oklahoma City, Oklahoma, United States
- Coordinates: 35.3413°N 97.3519°W
- Lake type: reservoir
- Basin countries: United States
- Surface area: 2,900 acres (1,200 ha)
- Average depth: 35 ft (11 m)
- Max. depth: 98 ft (30 m)
- Water volume: 87,296 acre⋅ft (107,678,000 m^{3})
- Shore length^{1}: 34 miles (55 km)
- Surface elevation: 1,191 ft (363 m)
- Settlements: Oklahoma City
- ^{1} Shore length is not a well-defined measure.

Lake Stanley Draper is a reservoir in southeast Oklahoma City, United States. It is one of three municipal reservoirs in the city. (Note: The other municipal reservoirs are Lake Hefner and Lake Overholser.) Principal construction on the reservoir occurred between 1962-1963. Upon completion it was named after the long-time director of the Oklahoma City Chamber of Commerce, Stanley Draper. Located between Midwest Boulevard and Post Road, near I-240, it receives water by pipeline from Atoka Lake and McGee Creek Reservoir.

== History ==
The lake was begun in 1962 to serve as a reservoir for Oklahoma City.

== Description ==
It has a surface area of 2,900 acres (1,200 ha), an average depth of 34 feet (10 m) and a maximum depth of 98 feet (30 m). The volume is 87,296 acre-feet (107,678,000 m^{3})

== Recreation ==
The lake is open for a number of things including, fishing, ATVs or dirt bikes, R.C. airplanes, boating (sailing, Water skiing, and jet skiing). Water skiing is allowed in the main body of the lake, but swimming is prohibited everywhere in the lake. There are four covered fishing piers, primitive campgrounds, picnic grounds, grills and rest rooms.

== Maintenance ==
In March 2010 City of Oklahoma City began work for the Atoka Pump Station Rehabilitation Project (APSRP). During the project 24 new pumps were installed while six others were refurbished along the 100 mi (160 km) Atoka Pipeline. During that time, the pumps were periodically shut down to allow for installation and refurbishment, which caused lake water levels to drop well below its normal pool depth of 1,187 ft (362 m). Because of the low water levels all boating is prohibited, with only authorized personnel allowed on the water. On February 25, 2011, the pipeline was brought back to full service allowing water to be pumped from Lake Atoka to Draper. From February 2011 the lake's water level remained low due to the lack of heavy rainfall because of the then ongoing drought and water usage by residents of Oklahoma City. The City expected that the lake would return to levels high enough to allow recreational use by late fall 2013. In April 2015 following substantial rainfall, the lake reached and passed its pool depth, bringing the lake back to full capacity.

== In popular culture ==
Lake Stanley Draper is featured prominently in a Free Nights and Weekends Podcast episode in 2024.
