= 1968 United States presidential election in Oklahoma =

- November 5, 1968

Nominee	Richard Nixon	Hubert Humphrey	George Wallace
Party	Republican	Democratic	American Independent
Home state	New York (Note: Although he was born in California and he served as a U.S. senator from California, in 1968 Richard Nixon's official state of residence was New York, because he moved there to practice law after his defeat in the 1962 California gubernatorial election. During his first term as president, Nixon re-established his residency in California. Consequently, most reliable reference books list Nixon's home state as New York in the 1968 election and his home state as California in the 1972 (and 1960) election.)	Minnesota	Alabama
Running mate	Spiro Agnew	Edmund Muskie	Curtis LeMay
Electoral vote	8	0	0
Popular vote	449,697	301,658	191,731
Percentage	47.68%	31.99%	20.33%
County results
Nixon
30–40%
40–50%
50–60%
60–70%
70–80%
Humphrey
30–40%
40–50%
50–60%
Wallace
30–40%
President before election
Lyndon B. Johnson
Democratic
Elected President
Richard Nixon
Republican

The 1968 United States presidential election in Oklahoma took place on November 5, 1968. All fifty states and the District of Columbia were part of the 1968 United States presidential election. Voters chose eight electors to the Electoral College, which selected the president and vice president of the United States.

Former Vice President Richard Nixon, the Republican nominee, won the state of Oklahoma with 449,697 votes and 47.68 percent of the vote, with Vice President Hubert Humphrey, the Democratic nominee, taking 301,658 votes and 31.99 percent of the vote, followed by American Independent George Wallace, who took 191,731 votes and 20.33 percent of the vote. Nixon was the first Republican to ever carry Marshall County.

Wallace’s performance is the second-best by a third-party candidate in Oklahoma, behind Ross Perot in 1992. Oklahoma was also Wallace's best performance in a state that had not been a part of the Confederacy. The Wallace pluralities in Atoka and Pushmataha Counties in the southeast marked the only occasion that a third-party candidate has ever carried any Oklahoma county.

== Results ==
Electoral results
Presidential candidate	Party	Home state	Popular vote		Electoral vote	Running mate		
Presidential candidate	Party	Home state	Count	Percentage	Electoral vote	Vice-presidential candidate	Home state	Electoral vote
Richard Nixon	Republican	New York	449,697	47.68%	8	Spiro Agnew	Maryland	8
Hubert Humphrey	Democrat	Minnesota	301,658	31.99%	0	Edmund Muskie	Maine	0
George Wallace	American	Alabama	191,731	20.33%	0	Curtis LeMay	California	0
Total			943,086	100%	8			8
Needed to win					270			270

=== Results by county ===
County	Richard Nixon Republican		Hubert Humphrey Democratic		George Wallace American Independent		Margin		Total votes cast
County	#	%	#	%	#	%	#	%	Total votes cast
Adair	2,877	53.02%	1,549	28.55%	1,000	18.43%	1,328	24.47%	5,426
Alfalfa	2,672	69.46%	865	22.49%	310	8.06%	1,807	46.97%	3,847
Atoka	1,131	27.29%	1,400	33.78%	1,613	38.92%	-213	-5.14%	4,144
Beaver	2,114	68.70%	624	20.28%	339	11.02%	1,490	48.42%	3,077
Beckham	2,935	42.92%	2,354	34.42%	1,550	22.66%	581	8.50%	6,839
Blaine	3,036	60.08%	1,285	25.43%	732	14.49%	1,751	34.65%	5,053
Bryan	2,727	33.24%	3,214	39.17%	2,264	27.59%	-487	-5.93%	8,205
Caddo	4,712	43.70%	4,212	39.07%	1,858	17.23%	500	4.63%	10,782
Canadian	5,891	49.12%	3,577	29.83%	2,525	21.05%	2,314	19.29%	11,993
Carter	5,127	35.73%	5,807	40.47%	3,414	23.79%	-680	-4.74%	14,348
Cherokee	3,971	47.32%	2,554	30.44%	1,866	22.24%	1,417	16.88%	8,391
Choctaw	1,414	26.03%	2,268	41.74%	1,751	32.23%	-517	-9.51%	5,433
Cimarron	1,122	53.81%	436	20.91%	527	25.28%	595	28.53%	2,085
Cleveland	12,446	48.29%	8,617	33.43%	4,711	18.28%	3,829	14.86%	25,774
Coal	669	29.64%	963	42.67%	625	27.69%	-294	-13.03%	2,257
Comanche	9,225	39.82%	8,061	34.80%	5,879	25.38%	1,164	5.02%	23,165
Cotton	1,016	32.64%	1,192	38.29%	905	29.07%	-176	-5.65%	3,113
Craig	2,686	44.67%	2,098	34.89%	1,229	20.44%	588	9.78%	6,013
Creek	6,934	43.34%	5,151	32.20%	3,913	24.46%	1,783	11.14%	15,998
Custer	4,709	56.31%	2,717	32.49%	936	11.19%	1,992	23.82%	8,362
Delaware	3,168	47.29%	2,129	31.78%	1,402	20.93%	1,039	15.51%	6,699
Dewey	1,508	53.46%	773	27.40%	540	19.14%	735	26.06%	2,821
Ellis	1,601	62.54%	533	20.82%	426	16.64%	1,068	41.72%	2,560
Garfield	14,370	61.99%	5,802	25.03%	3,011	12.99%	8,568	36.96%	23,183
Garvin	3,786	36.75%	3,845	37.33%	2,670	25.92%	-59	-0.58%	10,301
Grady	4,242	38.15%	4,760	42.81%	2,117	19.04%	-518	-4.66%	11,119
Grant	2,403	61.82%	1,047	26.94%	437	11.24%	1,356	34.88%	3,887
Greer	1,225	35.26%	1,419	40.85%	830	23.89%	-194	-5.59%	3,474
Harmon	644	30.04%	1,097	51.17%	403	18.80%	-453	-21.13%	2,144
Harper	1,483	63.00%	518	22.01%	353	15.00%	965	40.99%	2,354
Haskell	1,516	37.05%	1,563	38.20%	1,013	24.76%	-47	-1.15%	4,092
Hughes	1,897	33.60%	2,578	45.67%	1,170	20.73%	-681	-12.07%	5,645
Jackson	2,248	30.36%	3,371	45.52%	1,786	24.12%	-1,123	-15.16%	7,405
Jefferson	780	25.09%	1,628	52.36%	701	22.55%	-848	-27.27%	3,109
Johnston	1,048	32.37%	1,216	37.55%	974	30.08%	-168	-5.18%	3,238
Kay	12,751	59.06%	6,031	27.93%	2,809	13.01%	6,720	31.13%	21,591
Kingfisher	3,558	64.64%	1,226	22.27%	720	13.08%	2,332	42.37%	5,504
Kiowa	2,418	43.22%	2,219	39.67%	957	17.11%	199	3.55%	5,594
Latimer	1,091	32.73%	1,350	40.50%	892	26.76%	-259	-7.77%	3,333
LeFlore	3,600	32.83%	4,020	36.66%	3,345	30.51%	-420	-3.83%	10,965
Lincoln	3,855	47.43%	2,304	28.35%	1,969	24.22%	1,551	19.08%	8,128
Logan	3,960	48.55%	2,508	30.75%	1,689	20.71%	1,452	17.80%	8,157
Love	677	28.52%	931	39.22%	766	32.27%	-165	-6.95%	2,374
McClain	2,047	36.98%	1,842	33.27%	1,647	29.75%	205	3.71%	5,536
McCurtain	2,795	32.43%	2,944	34.16%	2,880	33.41%	-64	-0.75%	8,619
McIntosh	1,532	33.71%	1,759	38.70%	1,254	27.59%	-227	-4.99%	4,545
Major	2,550	72.84%	594	16.97%	357	10.20%	1,956	55.87%	3,501
Marshall	1,209	35.71%	1,191	35.17%	986	29.12%	18	0.54%	3,386
Mayes	4,260	44.63%	2,855	29.91%	2,431	25.47%	1,405	14.72%	9,546
Murray	1,454	34.18%	1,773	41.68%	1,027	24.14%	-319	-7.50%	4,254
Muskogee	8,707	38.39%	9,377	41.34%	4,596	20.26%	-670	-2.95%	22,680
Noble	2,911	58.92%	1,412	28.58%	618	12.51%	1,499	30.34%	4,941
Nowata	2,116	46.92%	1,314	29.14%	1,080	23.95%	802	17.78%	4,510
Okfuskee	1,686	37.94%	1,777	39.99%	981	22.07%	-91	-2.05%	4,444
Oklahoma	93,212	49.73%	60,395	32.22%	33,834	18.05%	32,817	17.51%	187,441
Okmulgee	4,709	34.81%	6,089	45.02%	2,728	20.17%	-1,380	-10.21%	13,526
Osage	5,499	46.50%	3,919	33.14%	2,407	20.36%	1,580	13.36%	11,825
Ottawa	5,000	44.48%	4,820	42.88%	1,421	12.64%	180	1.60%	11,241
Pawnee	2,437	51.09%	1,343	28.16%	990	20.75%	1,094	22.93%	4,770
Payne	9,577	53.73%	5,772	32.38%	2,475	13.89%	3,805	21.35%	17,824
Pittsburg	3,978	28.79%	6,112	44.24%	3,726	26.97%	-2,134	-15.45%	13,816
Pontotoc	4,161	38.26%	4,291	39.45%	2,425	22.29%	-130	-1.19%	10,877
Pottawatomie	6,899	39.44%	6,721	38.42%	3,873	22.14%	178	1.02%	17,493
Pushmataha	1,225	32.72%	1,232	32.91%	1,287	34.38%	-55	-1.47%	3,744
Roger Mills	1,102	45.31%	720	29.61%	610	25.08%	382	15.70%	2,432
Rogers	4,631	44.37%	2,665	25.53%	3,141	30.09%	1,490	14.28%	10,437
Seminole	3,711	38.09%	3,889	39.92%	2,142	21.99%	-178	-1.83%	9,742
Sequoyah	2,797	36.93%	2,618	34.57%	2,158	28.50%	179	2.36%	7,573
Stephens	5,508	38.46%	5,249	36.65%	3,566	24.90%	259	1.81%	14,323
Texas	3,729	63.65%	1,176	20.07%	954	16.28%	2,553	43.58%	5,859
Tillman	1,748	35.71%	1,771	36.18%	1,376	28.11%	-23	-0.47%	4,895
Tulsa	81,476	57.11%	32,748	22.95%	28,443	19.94%	48,728	34.16%	142,667
Wagoner	3,187	41.76%	2,183	28.60%	2,262	29.64%	925	12.12%	7,632
Washington	12,812	62.36%	4,641	22.59%	3,091	15.05%	8,171	39.77%	20,544
Washita	2,592	49.65%	1,771	33.92%	858	16.43%	821	15.73%	5,221
Woods	3,449	63.81%	1,439	26.62%	517	9.57%	2,010	37.19%	5,405
Woodward	3,748	64.01%	1,444	24.66%	663	11.32%	2,304	39.35%	5,855
Totals	449,697	47.68%	301,658	31.99%	191,731	20.33%	148,039	15.69%	943,086

==== Counties that flipped from Democratic to American Independent ====
- Atoka
- Pushmataha

==== Counties that flipped from Democratic to Republican ====
- Adair
- Beckham
- Caddo
- Canadian
- Cherokee
- Cleveland
- Comanche
- Custer
- Craig
- Creek
- Delaware
- Dewey
- Grant
- Kiowa
- Lincoln
- Logan
- McClain
- Mayes
- Marshall
- Nowata
- Noble
- Oklahoma
- Osage
- Ottawa
- Pawnee
- Payne
- Pottawatomie
- Roger Mills
- Rogers
- Sequoyah
- Stephens
- Wagoner
- Washita

== See also ==
- United States presidential elections in Oklahoma
