= Decelis =

Decelis or DeCelis

- Anthony Agius Decelis, Maltese politician
- DeCelis Branch, a stream in Missouri, USA
