= McGee, Missouri =

McGee
- Unincorporated community
- Location within the state of Missouri
- Coordinates: 37°04′28″N 90°11′44″W
- Country: United States
- State: Missouri
- County: Wayne
- Elevation: 390 ft (119 m)
- Time zone: UTC-6 (Central (CST))
  - Summer (DST): UTC-5 (CDT)
- ZIP codes: 63763
- GNIS feature ID: 741053

McGee is an unincorporated community in eastern Wayne County, Missouri, United States. It is located approximately twenty-three miles northeast of Poplar Bluff, at an elevation of 387 feet (118 m). The community lies on the south bank of McGee Creek on Missouri Route TT. The Mingo Swamp and wildlife reserve is about three miles to the southeast.

A post office called McGee has been in operation since 1906. The community has the name of Tom McGhee, a local postal worker.

== Geography ==
McGee Creek and its tributaries, Rocky Creek and DeCelis Branch, flow here.
