= Limestone Gap, Oklahoma =

Former community in Oklahoma, US

- Unincorporated community
- Location within the state of Oklahoma Limestone Gap, Oklahoma (the United States)
- Coordinates: 34°36′02″N 95°58′17″W
- Country: United States
- State: Oklahoma
- County: Atoka
- Elevation: 663 ft (202 m)
- Time zone: UTC-6 (Central (CST))
  - Summer (DST): UTC-5 (CDT)
- GNIS feature ID: 1100581

Limestone Gap was an unincorporated community in Atoka County, Oklahoma, United States. The town is now abandoned. A type of limestone is named after the site on Limestone Creek.

A post office was established at Limestone Gap, Indian Territory on March 29, 1875; it closed on February 28, 1922. From September 22, 1897, to July 15, 1901, the name of the post office was Limestone. The area is now known as Gap.

At the time of its founding, Limestone Gap was located in Atoka County, Choctaw Nation.

Gravestones in a cemetery there had deaths dating from 1886 to 1940. Charles LeFlore, a deputy US marshal, who served as captain of the Indian Police, had a ranch there.
