= Bentley, Oklahoma =

Unincorporated community in Oklahoma, US

Bentley
- Unincorporated community and Census designated place
- Location within the state of Oklahoma Bentley (the United States)
- Coordinates: 34°13′03″N 96°04′47″W
- Country: United States
- State: Oklahoma
- County: Atoka

Area
  - Total: 0.34 sq mi (0.88 km^{2})
  - Land: 0.34 sq mi (0.88 km^{2})
  - Water: 0 sq mi (0.00 km^{2})
- Elevation: 581 ft (177 m)

Population (2020)
  - Total: 42
  - Density: 124.1/sq mi (47.91/km^{2})
- Time zone: UTC-6 (Central (CST))
  - Summer (DST): UTC-5 (CDT)
- FIPS code: 40-05450
- GNIS feature ID: 2805306

Bentley is an unincorporated community in Atoka County, Oklahoma, United States, located east of the county seat of Atoka County, off Highway 3. As of the 2020 census, Bentley had a population of 42.

Bentley's post office was established in Indian Territory on June 1, 1903, and named after Alva Bentley, a territorial-era educator. At the time of its founding, the community was within Atoka County, Choctaw Nation.

A school once operated in Bentley but has since closed. The post office also closed on August 30, 1963.

Bentley's main street features a fire department, community center, and Southern Baptist Church.

== Demographics ==
Historical population
Census	Pop.	Note	%±
2020	42		—
U.S. Decennial Census

=== 2020 census ===
As of the 2020 census, Bentley had a population of 42. The median age was 41.5 years. 26.2% of residents were under the age of 18 and 19.0% of residents were 65 years of age or older. For every 100 females there were 121.1 males, and for every 100 females age 18 and over there were 138.5 males age 18 and over.

All residents lived in rural areas.

There were 14 households in Bentley, of which 14.3% had children under the age of 18 living in them. Of all households, 7.1% were married-couple households, 42.9% were households with a male householder and no spouse or partner present, and 35.7% were households with a female householder and no spouse or partner present. About 57.2% of all households were made up of individuals and 28.6% had someone living alone who was 65 years of age or older.

There were 20 housing units, of which 30.0% were vacant. The homeowner vacancy rate was 0.0% and the rental vacancy rate was 0.0%.

Racial composition as of the 2020 census
Race	Number	Percent
White	31	73.8%
Black or African American	0	0.0%
American Indian and Alaska Native	7	16.7%
Asian	0	0.0%
Native Hawaiian and Other Pacific Islander	0	0.0%
Some other race	0	0.0%
Two or more races	4	9.5%
Hispanic or Latino (of any race)	0	0.0%

== Education ==
Bentley falls within the Harmony Public School district.
