= Mount Olive, Oklahoma =

Ghost town in Oklahoma, US

Mount Olive
- Ghost town
- Location within the state of Oklahoma
- Coordinates: 34°27′31″N 96°0′31″W
- Country: United States
- State: Oklahoma
- County: Atoka
- Time zone: UTC-6 (Central (CST))
  - Summer (DST): UTC-5 (CDT)

Mount Olive is a Church to the east of Stringtown in Atoka County, Oklahoma, United States.
