= McGee Creek (Oklahoma) =

Coordinates: 34°16′54″N 95°53′32″W

McGee Creek is a tributary of Muddy Boggy Creek, an important waterway in southeastern Oklahoma. It flows primarily in Atoka County, Oklahoma. Muddy Boggy Creek, in turn, flows into the Red River of the South.

== Headwaters and tributaries ==
McGee Creek's headwaters may be traced to various points north and west of the unincorporated community of Wesley, Oklahoma. Wesley is located in northwestern Atoka County, Oklahoma. From there it flows in a generally southeasterly direction toward its confluence with Muddy Boggy Creek.

Tributaries, from south to north, include Medicine, Blue, Cat, Potapo, Panther, Bog Springs, Bear, Bugaboo, Little Caney, Grassy, Greasy, Ray, Ingersol, Doyal, and Nolleytubby creeks.

No information regarding the length of the creek, volume of water it carries, or officially determined point of origin, if any, is available.

== Watershed characteristics ==
McGee Creek and its tributaries flow through Sharp Hollow, Ray Hollow, Whiskey Hollow, Wildcat Canyon, and Bugaboo Canyon before reaching McGee Creek Lake, as well as through McGee Valley (as the western end of Jacksfork Valley is known), which is thought to be named for the creek. Two hollows—Grassy Hollow and Prairie Hollow—are now submerged beneath McGee Creek Lake.

The terrain of the McGee Creek watershed is very rough, hilly and isolated. This geographical characteristic means the region has few roads and is sparsely populated. Large portions of the watershed are now occupied by McGee Creek Lake and the McGee Creek State Park, McGee Creek State Natural Scenic Recreation Area, and McGee Creek Wildlife Management Area which surround it.

Protected areas surround the lake on all sides. McGee Creek Wildlife Management Area covers 10,000 acres. Terrain within the WMA ranges from steep to moderately steep. The wildlife management area surrounds the western arm of the lake. The adjacent state natural scenic recreation area, also called the Bugaboo Canyon natural scenic area, consists of approximately 8,900 acres. It surrounds the eastern arm of the lake.

== Impoundment ==
McGee Creek is impounded by McGee Creek Lake. Groundbreaking ceremonies were held on July 10, 1982, and the project was dedicated on August 22, 1986. The lake was built to help establish flood control in the Muddy Boggy and Red River basins, and to supply the city of Oklahoma City with water. Water from the lake reaches the state capital via an 18-mile-long aqueduct to Atoka Lake, from which it is piped to the Oklahoma City metropolitan area.

McGee Creek reservoir consists of two major arms: an eastern arm, which is the flooded valley of McGee Creek, and a western arm, which is the flooded valley of Potapo Creek.

The reservoir extends about 14 miles up McGee Creek and about 12 miles up Potapo Creek. Its shoreline measures 80.30 miles, and its volume is 100,146 acre feet. The lake's maximum depth is 103.50 feet and its surface area is 3,709 acres.

The lake dam is 1,968.5 feet long and 160.7 feet high. The dam was built one mile below the confluence of McGee and Potapo creeks and 3.4 miles above McGee Creek's confluence with Muddy Boggy Creek. In addition to the dam, a significant dike was constructed to block several small "saddles" on the west side of the reservoir rim. This dike is 4,800 feet long and 59 feet high.

== History ==
French fur trappers and traders named the most significant rivers and waterways in eastern Oklahoma during the 1700s. Several, such as the Poteau River and Kiamichi River, retain their original names. The French are thought to have called Muddy Boggy Creek the Vazzures. This was a corruption of the French word vaseaux, which meant boggy or "miry", because of the deep mud or mire in the channel bottom. Later, English-speaking traders named the stream, using the English translation. Many years later Choctaw Indians, who reestablished the Choctaw Nation in the region beginning in the 1830s, found that fish and game remained abundant along McGee and Muddy Boggy creeks, and considered the area a prime hunting ground.

No French name is known to have been assigned to McGee Creek, and it is possible they considered it as merely an extension of the Vazzures. The name “McGee Creek” first appears on official maps during the late 1890s, along with those of its principal tributaries.

Its present-day name is thought to be derived from that of local farmer Charles McGee, who lived on the bank of the creek during the latter days of the Indian Territory. His farm, located in what one local resident at the time called “rich bottom land”, produced several hundred bushels of corn, Irish potatoes, and sweet potatoes each year.
