= Muddy Boggy Creek =

Muddy Boggy Creek Muddy Boggy River

Location
- Country: United States of America
- State: Oklahoma

Physical characteristics
- Source
  - coordinates: 34°46′56″N 96°37′30″W
  - elevation: 300 m (980 ft)
- Mouth
  - coordinates: 33°56′16″N 95°36′40″W
  - elevation: 120 m (390 ft)
- Length: 175 km (109 mi)
- Discharge
  - location: Unger
  - average: 2,002 cu ft/s (56.7 m^{3}/s)

Basin features
- River system: Red River of the South

Muddy Boggy Creek, also known as the Muddy Boggy River, is a 175-mile-long (282 km) river in south central Oklahoma. The stream headwaters arise just east of Ada in Pontotoc County. It is a major tributary of the Red River in south central Oklahoma. Clear Boggy Creek is a major tributary which enters the Muddy Boggy at a location known as River Mile 24 (Note: River mile designates the distance from the mouth of the river.) in Choctaw County. The river is inhabited by over one hundred species of fish.

== Geography ==
Muddy Boggy Creek is located in the counties of Pontotoc, Hughes, Coal, Atoka, and Choctaw.

It begins on the eastern edge of Ada, and comes within 3 miles (5 km) of the Canadian River before turning southeast and passing through the Arkoma Basin and the western edge of the Ouachita Mountains. It is located in an area once known as the Cross Timbers. It joins the Red River at a point southwest of Hugo, just a few miles upriver from where Highway 271 crosses the Red River at the unincorporated town of Arthur City, Texas.

Lake Atoka and McGee Creek Lake are the only major impoundments on Muddy Boggy Creek.

=== Tributaries ===
Tributaries of Muddy Boggy Creek include Sand, Caney Boggy, Rock, East Fork, Coal, Caney (Coon), North Boggy, McGee, Cold Spring, Lick and Crowder creeks. Major tributaries of Clear Boggy Creek are Jackfork, Coal, Goose, Leader, Delaware, Sandy, Caney, Fronterhouse, Cowpen, Bois d'Arc and Mayhew creeks. According to Pigg, all of the tributaries in the headwaters are short and deep, while those in the lower elevations are short, shallow and filled with dead timber.

=== Topography ===
Near the source, the Muddy Boggy passes through the Arbuckle Mountains, and has a gradient of about 100 feet per mile (19 m/km). By the time it flows through the Cretaceous area, the gradient is only 5 feet per mile (0.95 m/km). It then flows through the Ouachita Mountains.

Clear Boggy Creek has a gradient of about 15 feet per mile (2.8 m/km) near its source and 1.5 feet per mile (0.28 m/km) near its mouth.

=== Watershed ===
The river basin is about 80 miles (130 km) long by 40 miles (64 km) wide. The drainage area is 2,429 square miles (6,290 km^{2}), and includes parts of Coal, Pontotoc, Hughes, Pittsburg, Atoka, Johnson, Bryan, Pushmataha, and Choctaw counties.

== History ==
=== Origin and Use of Name ===
Muriel H. Wright wrote that Doctor John Sibley had reported in 1805, that this stream had been called Vazzures by French explorers. She said this was a corruption of the French word vaseaux, which meant boggy or "miry", because of the deep mud or mire in the channel bottom. Later, English-speaking traders named the stream, using the English translation.

During territorial times, Choctaw Indians and white settlers alike referred to what are today called Clear Boggy Creek and Muddy Boggy Creek as the “forks of the Boggy”. The area between the two was known as being “between the Boggies”, a slight departure from the early-day convention of referring to the two as a single creek. Clear Boggy Creek did not achieve separate distinction until much later.

Another territorial-era name for Muddy Boggy Creek, "Middle Boggy Creek," is no longer in use. Area residents who used it as a naming convention tended to refer to different sections of the creek as the North Boggy, Middle Boggy, and South Boggy. This usage appears to have referred more to specific regions of the watershed than to characteristics of the creek itself.

Choctaw Indians began relocating to the Indian Territory and the Muddy Boggy basin during the 1830s, reestablishing what is today called the Choctaw Nation of Oklahoma and its government. Choctaws divided their nation into three administrative and judicial provinces, or districts, with each province being subdivided into counties. The Pushmataha District used the creek or its tributaries to form boundaries between Atoka County, Jack's Fork County, Jackson County and Kiamitia County. The District's administrative and judicial capital, Mayhew, was said to be positioned "between the forks of the Boggies".

=== Ferries and Bridges ===
Muddy Boggy was historically an impediment to travel in the region, due to its forks and also its main characteristic: muddy banks enclosing a fairly deep channel, making it difficult to ford. Three ferry boats plied the river during much of the territorial and early statehood days. Ferry operations were licensed by the Choctaw Government via Acts of the General Council, which determined pricing for each crossing and established each ferry operation as an individual franchise. An important ferry operated north of what is now Boswell, Oklahoma, along the road from Nelson, then an important farming center, to the capital of the Pushmataha District, or province, at Mayhew.

A second ferry operated along the same road, where it crossed Muddy Boggy just below the mouth of McGee Creek.

A third ferry operated one mile north of Atoka, Indian Territory (now Atoka, Oklahoma), near Harkins Spring. This may have been the busiest ferry of the three as it was closest to a town, and was along the Bullerfield Overland Mail, an important stagecoach line between Fort Smith, Arkansas and Boggy Depot, Indian Territory. At some point during the late territorial period the ferry boat was replaced by a toll bridge.

Bridges across the Muddy Boggy and its forks remained a novelty until a concerted period of highway planning and construction began to accompany the expanding private ownership of automobiles following World War One. The first bridge to cross Muddy Boggy east of Atoka, between Lane and Farris, was built in 1919. The first bridge over the creek along the highway between Durant and Hugo was built near Boswell in 1930.

=== Impounding the Waters ===
Following World War II, a series of dams was authorized by Congress along the main stem of the Red River of the South and its major tributaries, including the Muddy Boggy. These were primarily for flood control, but also for recreation and tourism. The dam on Muddy Boggy would have been three miles west of Soper, immediately north of the state highway, and created a lake called the Boswell Reservoir. Although the dam continues to be authorized, no funds have ever been appropriated for it due to a perceived lack of enthusiasm by local residents. Other dams authorized by Congress as part of the flood control project were built at Denison, Texas (Lake Texoma) and Sawyer, Oklahoma (Hugo Lake), among other locations.

=== Events of Note ===
During the American Civil War in the Indian Territory, a military engagement between Union and Confederate forces took place in the Choctaw Nation north of Boggy Depot, Indian Territory. The Battle of Middle Boggy, in February 1864, was fought over control of an important crossing of Muddy Boggy (or Middle Boggy) Creek and resulted in a Union victory. After the battle the Confederate army ceased to be an organized military force in the Indian Territory, leading in part to the Battle of Fort Smith in August 1864 and the fort's surrender to Union forces.
