= Wards Chapel, Oklahoma =

Unincorporated community in Oklahoma, US

Wards Chapel
- Unincorporated community
- Location within the state of Oklahoma Wards Chapel (the United States)
- Coordinates: 34°22′0″N 96°10′38″W
- Country: United States
- State: Oklahoma
- County: Atoka
- Time zone: UTC-6 (Central (CST))
  - Summer (DST): UTC-5 (CDT)

Wards Chapel is an unincorporated community in Atoka County, Oklahoma, United States. There are a few people, a few houses, and a church, Ward's Chapel Baptist Church. The community is located approximately five miles west of Atoka.
