= First Presbyterian Church (Atoka, Oklahoma) =

Historic church in Oklahoma, United States

- U.S. National Register of Historic Places
- Location within Oklahoma Location within the United States
- Location: 212 E. 1st St., Atoka, Oklahoma
- Coordinates: 34°23′2″N 96°7′35″W
- Area: less than one acre
- Built by: Faudree, Alderman Faudree
- Architectural style: Romanesque
- NRHP reference No.: 07000914
- Added to NRHP: September 6, 2007

The First Presbyterian Church is a historic Presbyterian church at 212 East 1st Street in Atoka, Oklahoma, United States, that is listed on the National Register of Historic Places (NRHP).

It was built in a Romanesque style and was added to the NRHP in 2007.

== See also ==
- National Register of Historic Places listings in Atoka County, Oklahoma
