= McGee Creek State Park =

State park in Oklahoma, United States

- Location within Oklahoma
- Location: Atoka County, Oklahoma, United States
- Nearest city: Antlers, OK
- Coordinates: 34°19′48″N 95°51′42″W
- Area: 2,600 acres (1,100 ha)
- Visitors: 55,609 (in 2021)
- Governing body: Oklahoma Tourism and Recreation Department
- Website: www.travelok.com/listings/view.profile/id.4972

McGee Creek State Park is a state park in southern Oklahoma. The park is on the south side of McGee Creek Reservoir, which impounds the waters of McGee Creek. Created in 1985 the reservoir provides flood control. The park is approximately 2,600 acres (1,100 ha) and the reservoir is approximately 3,800 acres (1,500 ha). Its main staple is recreational and sport fishing. The main fish fished for in this park include Crappie, Sunfish, Largemouth bass, and Channel catfish. The McGee Creek Wildlife Management area is located between the two arms of the reservoir.

Bear and deer are among the animals present. Shortleaf pine, though near its western limit, is abundant.

When the park, the lake and the Wildlife Management Area are considered together, the total protected area around the lake is about 20,000 acres (8,100 ha).

McGee Creek Natural Scenic Recreation Area is connected to with McGee Creek State Park. Both are a part of the McGee Creek Wildlife Management Area. The Natural Scenic Recreation Area is located in the top northeast area of the wildlife refuge. Activities in the Scenic Recreation Area include horseback riding, hiking, mountain biking, camping, fishing, canoeing, kayaking, and bouldering.
