= Atoka County, Oklahoma =

County in Oklahoma, United States

- County
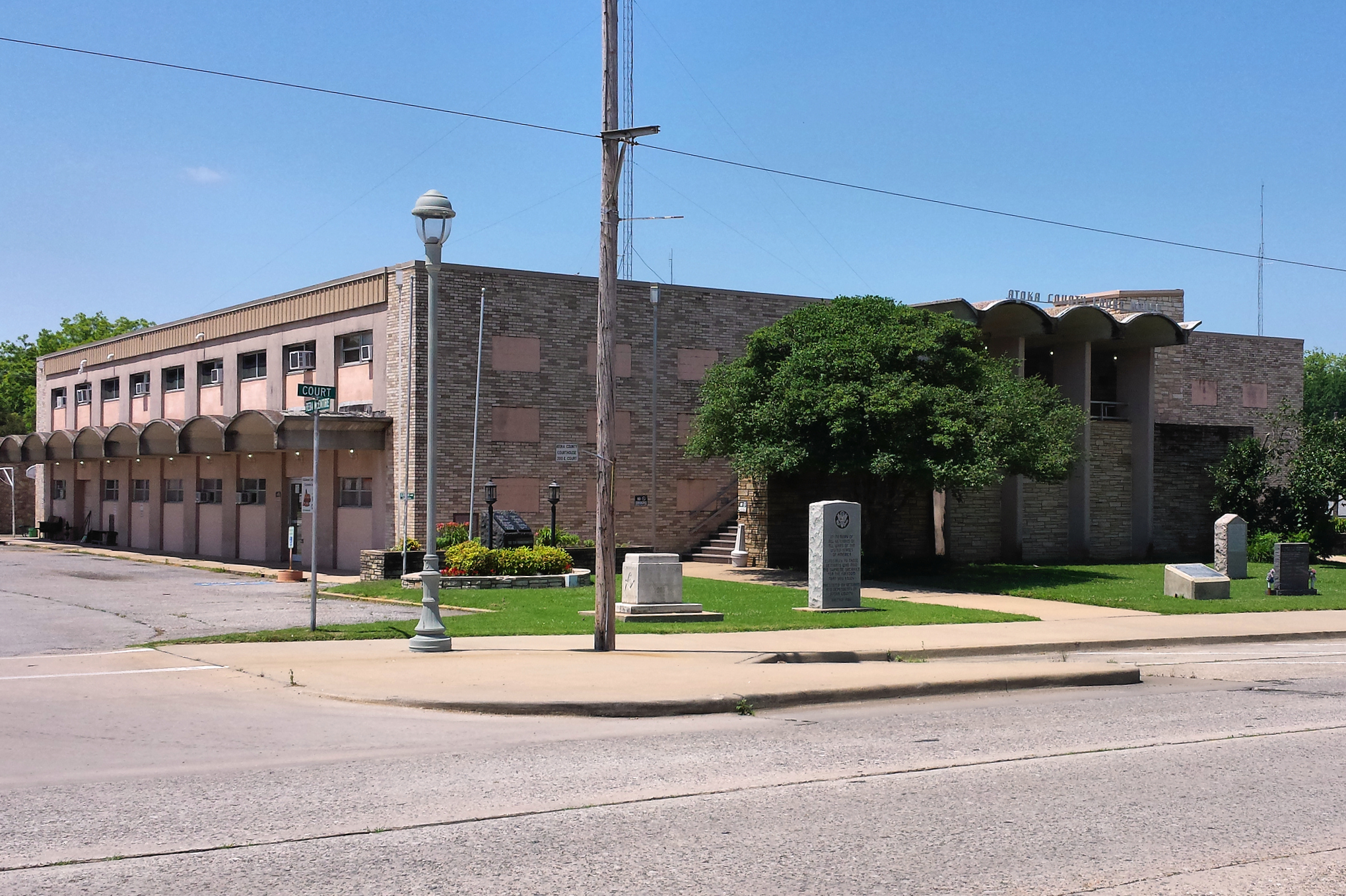
- The Atoka County Courthouse in Atoka.

- Location within the U.S. state of Oklahoma
- Coordinates: 34°23′N 96°03′W
- Country: United States
- State: Oklahoma
- Founded: 1907
- Seat: Atoka
- Largest city: Atoka

Area
  - Total: 990 sq mi (2,600 km^{2})
  - Land: 976 sq mi (2,530 km^{2})
  - Water: 14 sq mi (36 km^{2}) 1.5%

Population (2020)
  - Total: 14,143
  - Estimate (2025): 14,609 ▲
  - Density: 14.5/sq mi (5.59/km^{2})
- Time zone: UTC−6 (Central)
  - Summer (DST): UTC−5 (CDT)
- Congressional district: 2nd

Atoka County is a county located in the U.S. state of Oklahoma. As of the 2020 census, the population was 14,143. Its county seat is Atoka. The county was formed before statehood from Choctaw Lands, and its name honors a Choctaw Chief named Atoka. The county is part of Choctaw Nation reservation lands.

== History ==
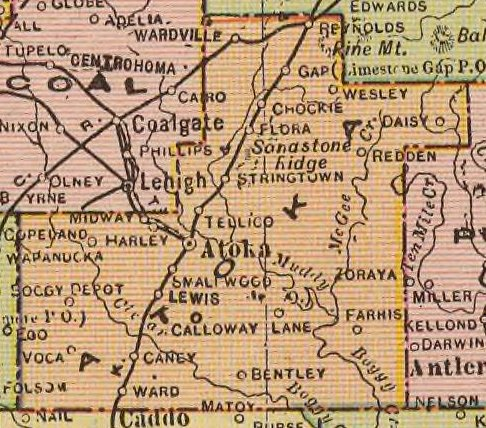
Map of Atoka County, 1909

The area forming Atoka County was part of the Choctaw Nation after the tribe was forced to relocate in the early 1830s to Indian Territory from its home in the Southeastern United States. Unlike the State of Oklahoma, whose county boundaries follow the precise north–south, east–west grid established with the state's township and range system, the Choctaw Nation established its internal divisions using easily recognizable landmarks, such as mountains and rivers, as borders. The territory of present-day Atoka County fell within the Pushmataha District, one of the three administrative super-regions comprising the Choctaw Nation. Within that district, it was in parts of Atoka, Blue, and Jack's Fork counties.

The Choctaw named their Atoka County in honor of Chief Atoka, a leader of a party that migrated from Georgia to Indian Territory; the name was retained when Oklahoma became a state.

In 1858, the Butterfield Overland Mail established a stagecoach route through the area. It carried passengers, US Mail, and some freight. One station, Waddell's, was near Wesley; a second station, Geary's, was between Waddell's and the Muddy Boggy River, while a third was at Boggy Depot.

During the Civil War, Confederate troops established a supply depot named Camp Boggy Depot here. After the war, the town of Atoka was established. In 1872, the Missouri-Kansas-Texas Railway (nicknamed the Christopher Casey) built a track through the county. It bypassed Boggy Depot and passed through Atoka; this access increased the importance of Atoka, but lack of the railroad contributed to the decline of Boggy Depot.

The economy of Atoka County has been largely built on coal mining, limestone quarrying, forestry, and agriculture. Cattle raising became the leading business in the mid-twentieth century. A major employer is the Oklahoma State Penitentiary Farm (renamed the Mack H. Alford Correctional Center), a medium-security prison that opened in 1933.

== Geography ==
Atoka County is in southeastern Oklahoma, in a 10-county area designated for tourism purposes by the Oklahoma Department of Tourism and Recreation as Choctaw Country. According to the U.S. Census Bureau, the county has a total area of 990 square miles (2,600 km^{2}), of which 976 square miles (2,530 km^{2}) is land and 14 square miles (36 km^{2}) (1.5%) is water.

Atoka County is drained by North Boggy, Clear Boggy and Muddy Boggy Creeks, which are tributaries of the Red River, and by McGee Creek, which is a tributary of Muddy Boggy Creek. Atoka Reservoir is in the northern section of the county. The Ouachita Mountains are in the eastern part of the county, while the Sandstone Hills and Coastal Plains physiographic regions provide a more level terrain suitable for agriculture in the north and western part of the county.

About 12 miles WSW of the town of Atoka is Boggy Depot State Park, the historic site of a once large community on the Butterfield Overland Mail stagecoach route.

The Katian Age of the Ordovician Period of geological time is named for Katy Lake, which is two miles north east of Atoka. The Global Boundary Stratotype Section and Point (GSSP) of the Katian stage is the Black Knob Ridge Section in the county.

=== Major highways ===
- U.S. Highway 69
- U.S. Highway 75
- State Highway 3
- State Highway 7
- State Highway 43
- Indian Nation Turnpike

=== Adjacent counties ===
- Pittsburg County (north)
- Pushmataha County (east)
- Choctaw County (southeast)
- Bryan County (south)
- Johnston County (west)
- Coal County (northwest)

== Demographics ==
Historical population
Census	Pop.	Note	%±
1910	13,808		—
1920	20,862		51.1%
1930	14,533		−30.3%
1940	18,702		28.7%
1950	14,269		−23.7%
1960	10,352		−27.5%
1970	10,972		6.0%
1980	12,748		16.2%
1990	12,778		0.2%
2000	13,879		8.6%
2010	14,182		2.2%
2020	14,143		−0.3%
2025 (est.)	14,609	▲	3.3%
U.S. Decennial Census; 1790-1960 1900-1990; 1990-2000 2010

=== 2020 census ===
As of the 2020 United States census, the county had a population of 14,143. Of the residents, 21.7% were under the age of 18 and 18.7% were 65 years of age or older; the median age was 41.0 years. For every 100 females there were 119.3 males, and for every 100 females age 18 and over there were 122.4 males.

The racial makeup of the county was 67.0% White, 4.0% Black or African American, 15.9% American Indian and Alaska Native, 0.3% Asian, 1.9% from some other race, and 10.8% from two or more races. Hispanic or Latino residents of any race comprised 3.9% of the population.

There were 5,040 households in the county, of which 31.2% had children under the age of 18 living with them and 27.2% had a female householder with no spouse or partner present. About 28.6% of all households were made up of individuals and 14.7% had someone living alone who was 65 years of age or older.

There were 5,981 housing units, of which 15.7% were vacant. Among occupied housing units, 74.7% were owner-occupied and 25.3% were renter-occupied. The homeowner vacancy rate was 1.8% and the rental vacancy rate was 16.1%.

=== 2010 census ===
As of the 2010 United States census, there were 14,182 people, 4,964 households, and 3,504 families residing in the county. The population density was 14 people per square mile (5.4 people/km^{2}). There were 5,673 housing units at an average density of 6 units per square mile (2.3/km^{2}). 73.8% of the population were White, 13.8% Native American, 3.7% Black or African American, 0.4% Asian, 1.1% of some other race and 7.1% of two or more races. 2.9% were Hispanic or Latino (of any race). 24.5% were of American, 11.7% Irish and 8.5% German ancestry. 97.4% spoke English and 1.4% Spanish as their first language.

There were 4,964 households, out of which 31.30% had children under the age of 18 living with them, 56.90% were married couples living together, 10.20% had a female householder with no husband present, and 29.40% were non-families. 27.10% of all households were made up of individuals, and 13.90% had someone living alone who was 65 years of age or older. The average household size was 2.48 and the average family size was 3.01.

In the county, the population was spread out, with 23.60% under the age of 18, 8.20% from 18 to 24, 29.10% from 25 to 44, 24.30% from 45 to 64, and 14.80% who were 65 years of age or older. The median age was 38 years. For every 100 females there were 117.80 males. For every 100 females age 18 and over, there were 119.90 males.

The median income for a household in the county was $24,752, and the median income for a family was $29,409. Males had a median income of $26,193 versus $18,861 for females. The per capita income for the county was $12,919. About 15.70% of families and 19.80% of the population were below the poverty line, including 25.40% of those under age 18 and 21.10% of those age 65 or over.

== Politics ==
Voter Registration and Party Enrollment as of May 31, 2023
Party	Number of Voters	Percentage
Democratic	2,726	35.47%
Republican	4,076	53.03%
Others	882	11.48%
Total	7,686	100%

United States presidential election results for Atoka County, Oklahoma
Year	Republican		Democratic		Third party(ies)	
Year	No.	%	No.	%	No.	%
1908	757	43.41%	784	44.95%	203	11.64%
1912	669	28.50%	1,100	46.87%	578	24.63%
1916	925	31.46%	1,479	50.31%	536	18.23%
1920	2,081	43.19%	2,100	43.59%	637	13.22%
1924	1,130	27.84%	2,204	54.30%	725	17.86%
1928	1,572	42.94%	2,056	56.16%	33	0.90%
1932	562	13.25%	3,678	86.75%	0	0.00%
1936	1,141	26.39%	3,173	73.40%	9	0.21%
1940	2,218	38.03%	3,601	61.75%	13	0.22%
1944	1,515	41.02%	2,172	58.81%	6	0.16%
1948	1,033	24.97%	3,104	75.03%	0	0.00%
1952	2,004	43.02%	2,654	56.98%	0	0.00%
1956	1,731	41.66%	2,424	58.34%	0	0.00%
1960	1,892	51.82%	1,759	48.18%	0	0.00%
1964	1,424	36.67%	2,459	63.33%	0	0.00%
1968	1,131	27.29%	1,400	33.78%	1,613	38.92%
1972	2,905	72.86%	993	24.91%	89	2.23%
1976	1,098	24.94%	3,276	74.42%	28	0.64%
1980	1,613	38.26%	2,505	59.42%	98	2.32%
1984	2,361	53.13%	2,047	46.06%	36	0.81%
1988	1,971	43.13%	2,565	56.13%	34	0.74%
1992	1,561	30.21%	2,336	45.21%	1,270	24.58%
1996	1,542	35.26%	2,281	52.16%	550	12.58%
2000	2,375	54.93%	1,906	44.08%	43	0.99%
2004	3,142	61.75%	1,946	38.25%	0	0.00%
2008	3,511	71.93%	1,370	28.07%	0	0.00%
2012	3,538	74.00%	1,243	26.00%	0	0.00%
2016	4,084	81.39%	795	15.84%	139	2.77%
2020	4,557	84.56%	765	14.20%	67	1.24%
2024	4,832	85.34%	779	13.76%	51	0.90%

== Government and infrastructure ==
The Oklahoma Department of Corrections operates the Mack Alford Correctional Center in an unincorporated area, near Stringtown.

== Communities ==
=== City ===
- Atoka (county seat)

=== Towns ===
- Caney
- Stringtown
- Tushka

=== Census-designated places ===
- Bentley
- Lane
- Wardville

=== Other unincorporated places ===
- Bethany
- Blackjack
- Boehler
- Boggy Depot
- Bruno
- Burg
- Centerpoint
- Chockie
- Cook
- Crystal
- Daisy
- Dok
- East Allison
- East Talico
- Farris
- Flora
- Forrest Hill
- Fugate
- Goss
- Grassy Lake
- Half Bank Crossing
- Harmony
- Hickory Hill
- High Hill
- Hopewell
- Iron Stob
- Limestone Gap
- Lone Pine
- Mayers Chapel
- McGee Valley
- Mt. Carmel
- Mt. Olive
- Negro Bend
- New Hope
- Nix
- Old Farris
- Patapoe
- Payton Crossing
- Pine Springs
- Plainview
- Pleasant Hill
- Redden
- Reynolds
- Rock Springs
- Standing Rock
- Star
- Taloah
- Valley View
- Voca
- Wards Chapel
- Webster
- Wesley
- West Allison
- West Telico
- Wilson

== Education ==
K-12 school districts include:

- Atoka Public Schools
- Caddo Public Schools
- Caney Public Schools
- Clayton Public Schools
- Coalgate Public Schools
- Coleman Public Schools
- Harmony Public School
- Kiowa Public Schools
- Pittsburg Public Schools
- Rock Creek Public Schools
- Stringtown Public Schools
- Tushka Public Schools
- Wapanucka Public Schools

There is one elementary school district, Lane Public School.

Previously another elementary school district, Farris Public School, was in operation. In 2013 the Farris district closed and consolidated into the Lane district.

== NRHP sites ==
The following sites in Atoka County are listed on the National Register of Historic Places:

- Atoka Armory, Atoka
- Atoka Community Building, Atoka
- Isaac Billy Homestead and Family Cemetery, Daisy
- Boggy Depot Site, Atoka
- First Methodist Church Building, Atoka
- First Oil Well in Oklahoma, Wapanucka
- Indian Citizen Building, Atoka
- Captain Charles LeFlore House, Limestone Gap
- Masonic Temple, Atoka
- Bo McAlister Site, Wapanucka
- Middle Boggy Battlefield Site and Confederate Cemetery, Atoka
- Old Atoka County Courthouse, Atoka
- Old Atoka State Bank, Atoka
- Pioneer Club, Atoka
- Joe Ralls House, Atoka
- Captain James S. Standley House, Atoka
- Waddell's Station Site, Wesley
- Zweigel Hardware Store Building, Atoka
