= Mack Alford Correctional Center =

Prison in Oklahoma, United States

Coordinates: 34°31′31″N 96°02′10″W

- Location in Oklahoma
- Location: Stringtown, Oklahoma
- Status: Operational
- Security class: Medium & Minimum
- Capacity: 933
- Population: 789 (April 10, 2017)
- Opened: 1973; 53 years ago
- Managed by: Oklahoma Department of Corrections
- Warden: Margaret Green
- Website: Oklahoma Department of Corrections - Mack Alford Correctional Center

Mack H. Alford Correctional Center (MACC, originally the Stringtown Correctional Center) is an Oklahoma Department of Corrections prison in unincorporated Atoka County, Oklahoma, near Stringtown. The medium security prison, which opened in 1973, is named after Mack H. Alford, who once served as the prison's warden.

Oklahoma Corrections Industry operates a factory for furniture renovation and sign production at the facility. A 150 herd cow/calf operation is also operated by the Department of Corrections Agri-Services.

On May 14, 1988 inmates rioted while preparing to be transported, taking 8 guards hostage. The rioters started fires in 3 buildings, causing extensive damage. One guard and an inmate were wounded.

== Notable inmates ==
- Glen Gore - convicted of the murder of Debbie Carter following the exoneration of Ron Williamson and Dennis Fritz
