= Boggy Depot, Oklahoma =

Ghost town in Oklahoma, US

- Boggy Depot Site
- U.S. National Register of Historic Places
- Location within Oklahoma Location within the United States
- Nearest city: Atoka, Oklahoma
- Coordinates: 34°19′13″N 96°18′51″W
- Built: 1838
- NRHP reference No.: 72001050
- Added to NRHP: April 19, 1972

Boggy Depot is a ghost town and Oklahoma State Park that was formerly a significant city in the Indian Territory. It grew as a vibrant and thriving town in present-day Atoka County, Oklahoma, United States, and became a major trading center on the Texas Road and the Butterfield Overland Mail route between Missouri and San Francisco. After the Civil War, when the MKT Railroad came through the area, it bypassed Boggy Depot and the town began a steady decline. It was soon replaced by Atoka as the chief city in the area. By the early 20th century, all that remained of the community was a sort of ghost town.

== History ==
Choctaw and Chickasaw Indians founded the town in 1837. The United States government had moved the Choctaws and Chickasaws to Indian Territory from Mississippi and Alabama in the 1830s. While at first the two tribes lived together on the Choctaw land, the Chickasaws later emigrated to the western portions of the Indian Territory and formed their own separate nation on land transferred to them by the Choctaw.

Boggy Depot was located in Atoka County, Choctaw Nation, a territorial-era government unit that included portions of today's Atoka, Coal, Hughes and Pittsburg counties.

In 1834, General Henry Leavenworth built the military road from Camp Washita (later Fort Washita) to Fort Gibson. For years this road served as a dividing line between the Choctaw and Chickasaw lands. Afterwards a treaty created a formal dividing line between the nations, with Boggy Depot on the east side of the line in Choctaw lands. The Reverend Cyrus Kingsbury established the church in Boggy Depot in 1840. The church building was the temporary capitol of the Choctaw Nation in 1859. Boggy Depot received a post office in 1848, (Note: Historian George H. Shirk wrote that the Boggy Depot post office was established November 5, 1849.) and in 1858 became a stop on the Butterfield Overland Stage line. During the Civil War, a Union raiding party fought a Confederate group at the Battle of Middle Boggy Depot a few miles northeast of Boggy Depot, which had become the major supply depot in Indian Territory for the Confederates. After the Civil War with Boggy Depot in the Choctaw Nation, many of the original settlers, mostly Chickasaws, abandoned Boggy Depot. A small community formed near this time two miles (3 km) south of Boggy Depot named New Boggy Depot. The former Boggy Depot post office was moved to the new location and renamed New Boggy Depot on March 22, 1872. It was renamed as Boggy Depot on December 26, 1883. Choctaw Chief Allen Wright, who lived at Boggy Depot, coined the word 'Oklahoma' in 1866 to describe the Indian Territory. The name was officially used for the state in 1907. In 1869 Oklahoma's first Masonic Lodge was founded in Boggy Depot.

As part of the treaty between the Five Civilized Tribes and the United States government at the end of the Civil War the tribes had to allow the construction of a north to south railroad across their lands. This railroad became a reality in 1872. The Missouri, Kansas and Texas Railway, or Katy, ran 12 miles (19 km) east of Boggy Depot and was the end of the town's importance. The city of Atoka, on the railroad, flourished while Boggy Depot languished and became a ghost town. The Boggy Depot post office officially closed on July 31, 1934.

== Current status ==
Today little remains of the original town except for a few stone foundations and the cemetery. Choctaw Chief Allen Wright and the Reverend Cyrus Kingsbury are buried there. Boggy Depot Park 34°19′14″N 96°18′28″W, formerly known as Boggy Depot State Park, is a recreation area that commemorates the old town and the history of the area. The park gets its name from Clear Boggy Creek and from its use as a Confederate commissary depot during the Civil War. The park features a fishing lake, nature trail, baseball diamond, playground, picnic tables, group picnic shelters, charcoal grills, and comfort stations with showers. After the state announced that it would close the park as a budget-cutting measure, the Choctaw tribe took over ownership and management responsibilities. This is no longer a state park. Boggy Depot was added to the National Register of Historic Places (#72001050) in 1972.

The Chickasaw nation was reluctant to spend its funds on major capital improvements unless it had clear title to the property. In 2013, the Oklahoma House of Representatives considered a bill to transfer ownership of the property to the Chickasaws.

== Media ==
Jerry Cantrell from the rock band Alice in Chains, named his first solo album Boggy Depot after the area where his father grew up. The album cover shows Cantrell covered in mud standing waist-deep in a branch of the Boggy River.

Author Harold Keith features the town in Chapter 21 of his Newbery Medal-winning novel Rifles for Watie, which is set during the American Civil War.
