= Caney, Oklahoma =

Town in Oklahoma, US

- Town
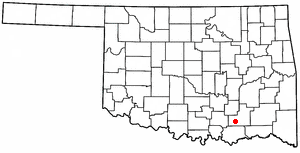
- Location of Caney, Oklahoma
- Coordinates: 34°14′09″N 96°13′02″W
- Country: United States
- State: Oklahoma
- County: Atoka

Area
  - Total: 0.76 sq mi (1.96 km^{2})
  - Land: 0.76 sq mi (1.96 km^{2})
  - Water: 0 sq mi (0.00 km^{2})
- Elevation: 591 ft (180 m)

Population (2020)
  - Total: 185
  - Density: 244.8/sq mi (94.52/km^{2})
- Time zone: UTC-6 (Central (CST))
  - Summer (DST): UTC-5 (CDT)
- ZIP code: 74533
- Area code: 580
- FIPS code: 40-11550
- GNIS feature ID: 2413157

Caney is a town in Atoka County, Oklahoma, United States. The population was 185 as of the 2020 Census.

== History ==
A post office was established at Caney Switch, Indian Territory for a short time in 1879. The post office took its name from nearby Caney Creek, and referred to the cane brakes along the course of the waterway. The post office was reestablished one mile south as Caney, Indian Territory on June 20, 1888, taking its name from the former post office at Caney Switch. The communities were both station stops on the Missouri, Kansas and Texas Railroad.

At the time of their founding, the communities were located in Atoka County, Choctaw Nation, a part of the Pushmataha District.

== Geography ==
According to the United States Census Bureau, the town has a total area of 0.81 square miles (2.1 km^{2}), all land.

Caney is not directly served by the Oklahoma state highway system; however, U.S. Highway 69 is located just west of town.

== Demographics ==
Historical population
Census	Pop.	Note	%±
1910	295		—
1920	432		46.4%
1930	274		−36.6%
1940	361		31.8%
1950	252		−30.2%
1960	128		−49.2%
1970	200		56.3%
1980	203		1.5%
1990	184		−9.4%
2000	199		8.2%
2010	205		3.0%
2020	185		−9.8%
U.S. Decennial Census

As of the census of 2000, there were 199 people, 85 households, and 57 families residing in the town. The population density was 237.8 inhabitants per square mile (91.8/km^{2}). There were 94 housing units at an average density of 112.3 per square mile (43.4/km^{2}). The racial makeup of the town was 80.90% White, 14.57% Native American, 0.50% Asian, and 4.02% from two or more races. Hispanic or Latino of any race were 1.01% of the population.

There were 85 households, out of which 31.8% had children under the age of 18 living with them, 48.2% were married couples living together, 14.1% had a female householder with no husband present, and 31.8% were non-families. 31.8% of all households were made up of individuals, and 10.6% had someone living alone who was 65 years of age or older. The average household size was 2.34 and the average family size was 2.95.

In the town, the population was spread out, with 26.6% under the age of 18, 10.1% from 18 to 24, 25.6% from 25 to 44, 26.1% from 45 to 64, and 11.6% who were 65 years of age or older. The median age was 39 years. For every 100 females, there were 95.1 males. For every 100 females age 18 and over, there were 92.1 males.

The median income for a household in the town was $14,063, and the median income for a family was $17,045. Males had a median income of $18,438 versus $18,125 for females. The per capita income for the town was $6,825. About 25.0% of families and 36.5% of the population were below the poverty line, including 46.8% of those under the age of eighteen and 45.8% of those 65 or over.
