= McGee Creek (Missouri) =

Stream in the U.S. state of Missouri

McGee Creek is a stream in northeastern Wayne County in the U.S. state of Missouri. The stream is a tributary to the Mingo Swamp.

The stream headwaters arise in northern Wayne County (at 37°05′33″N 90°15′42″W) and the stream flows east-southeast parallel to Missouri Route P. It crosses under Route TT just north of McGee and continues to the southeast crossing under Route Z just prior to entering the swamp (at 37°02′54″N 90°07′46″W).

McGee Creek has the name of the local McGhee family.

== See also ==
- List of rivers of Missouri
