= Wesley, Oklahoma =

Unincorporated community in Oklahoma, US

Wesley
- Unincorporated community
- Location within the state of Oklahoma Wesley (the United States)
- Coordinates: 34°35′16″N 95°53′52″W
- Country: United States
- State: Oklahoma
- County: Atoka
- Elevation: 810 ft (250 m)
- Time zone: UTC-6 (Central (CST))
  - Summer (DST): UTC-5 (CDT)
- GNIS feature ID: 1100930

Wesley is an unincorporated community in Atoka County, Oklahoma, United States. It is ten miles south of Kiowa.

A post office was established at Wesley, Indian Territory on October 2, 1903. It closed on May 15, 1955. At the time of its founding, Wesley was located in Atoka County, Choctaw Nation.
