= McGee Creek Reservoir =

- Location within Oklahoma Location within the United States
- Location: Atoka County, Oklahoma
- Coordinates: 34°21′41″N 95°53′36″W
- Lake type: reservoir
- Primary inflows: McGee Creek
- Primary outflows: McGee Creek
- Basin countries: United States
- Surface area: 3,810 acres (15.4 km^{2})
- Max. depth: 116 ft (35 m)
- Water volume: 113,980 acre⋅ft (0.14059 km^{3})
- Shore length^{1}: 64 km (40 mi)
- Surface elevation: 577 ft (176 m)
- Settlements: Atoka, Oklahoma; Antlers, Oklahoma
- ^{1} Shore length is not a well-defined measure.

McGee Creek Reservoir is a reservoir in Atoka County, Oklahoma. It impounds the waters of McGee Creek and several smaller streams, including Potapo, (Note: The name of Potapo Creek is said to be from the Choctaw word, potaapo, which means "floor" or "bridge" in English.) Panther, Little Bugaboo, Bear, Blue, Mill, and Crooked creeks, all of which are tributaries of Muddy Boggy River. According to the Bureau of Reclamation (BuRec), the reservoir was designed to extend 14 miles (23 km) up McGee Creek and 9 miles (14 km) up Potapo Creek when the water is at "conservation level.

McGee Creek Lake is bordered by the McGee Creek Wildlife Management Area, the McGee Creek Natural State Scenic Recreation Area, and McGee Creek State Park. The combined effect of these protected lands is to afford the area the same rural and isolated nature it has always known.

== Description ==
=== Reservoir ===
McGee Creek Lake is 17 miles (27 km) east of Atoka; 18 miles (29 km) west of Antlers and 3 miles (4.8 km) north of Farris, Oklahoma

The reservoir, which filled at the completion of the United States Bureau of Reclamation McGee Dam in 1987, consists of 3,810 acres (15.4 km^{2}) surface area and 64 miles (103 km) of shoreline. Its pool elevation is 577 feet (176 m) above sea level and it holds 113,930 acre-feet (140,530,000 m^{3}). At flood stage its pool elevation is 595.5 feet (181.5 m) above sea level and its storage capacity rises to 199,270 acre-feet (245,800,000 m^{3}). The reservoir has a maximum depth of 116 feet (35 m) at the dam when the water is at conservation pool level.

=== Dam and river outlet ===
The dam is an earth-filled structure that is 1,968.5 feet (600.0 m) long and 160.7 feet (49.0 m) high across McGee Creek. An earthen dike 4,800 feet (1,500 m) long and 59 feet (18 m) high, blocks several saddles on the west side of the reservoir rim. A riprap blanket prevents erosion of the upstream sides of both the dam and the dike. The river outlet works located on the east side of the dam release water to McGee Creek under extreme conditions. The works include an intake structure, three conduits (each about 15 feet (4.6 m) in diameter), a stilling basin, associated gates and controls. The discharge channel to McGee Creek can pass flows ranging from 6,500 cubic feet (180 m^{3}) to 50,000 cubic feet (1,400 m^{3}) per second.

=== Municipal water outlet ===
Water from the lake is routinely pumped to municipal consumers via pipeline. The municipal outlet works has a bypass that diverts 11 cubic feet (0.31 m^{3}) directly downstream to McGee Creek. This provides a constant stream of water that is beneficial to marine life. The river outlet works, located on the east side of the dam, handle this function. A separate intake leads to three conduits (each 15 feet (4.6 m) diameter), which terminate in a stilling basin, that has a single pipe leading to the three variable-capacity centrifugal discharge pumps. The pumps discharge into a surge tank at the Atoka Lake, 18 miles (29 km) away, via a concrete pipe that is 5 feet (1.5 m) diameter. Other pumps then transfer the water to Oklahoma City.

== History ==
The McGee Creek Project and McGee Creek Authority were established in 1978 to develop and maintain the McGee Creek Reservoir to provide a municipal and industrial water supply for areas in central and southern Oklahoma, including Oklahoma City and Atoka County. Under the direct supervision of superintendent Glen Russell, the authority has operated and maintained the reservoir and associated facilities, including an attached water pipeline, a surge tank, a regulating tank, a maintenance complex, and land easements surrounding these facilities. The U.S. Department of Interior, Bureau of Reclamation owns the reservoir, but has granted McGee Creek Authority ownership title to the project office, aqueduct and appurtenances, and other operation and maintenance related facilities.
