= 1992 United States presidential election in Oklahoma =

- November 3, 1992
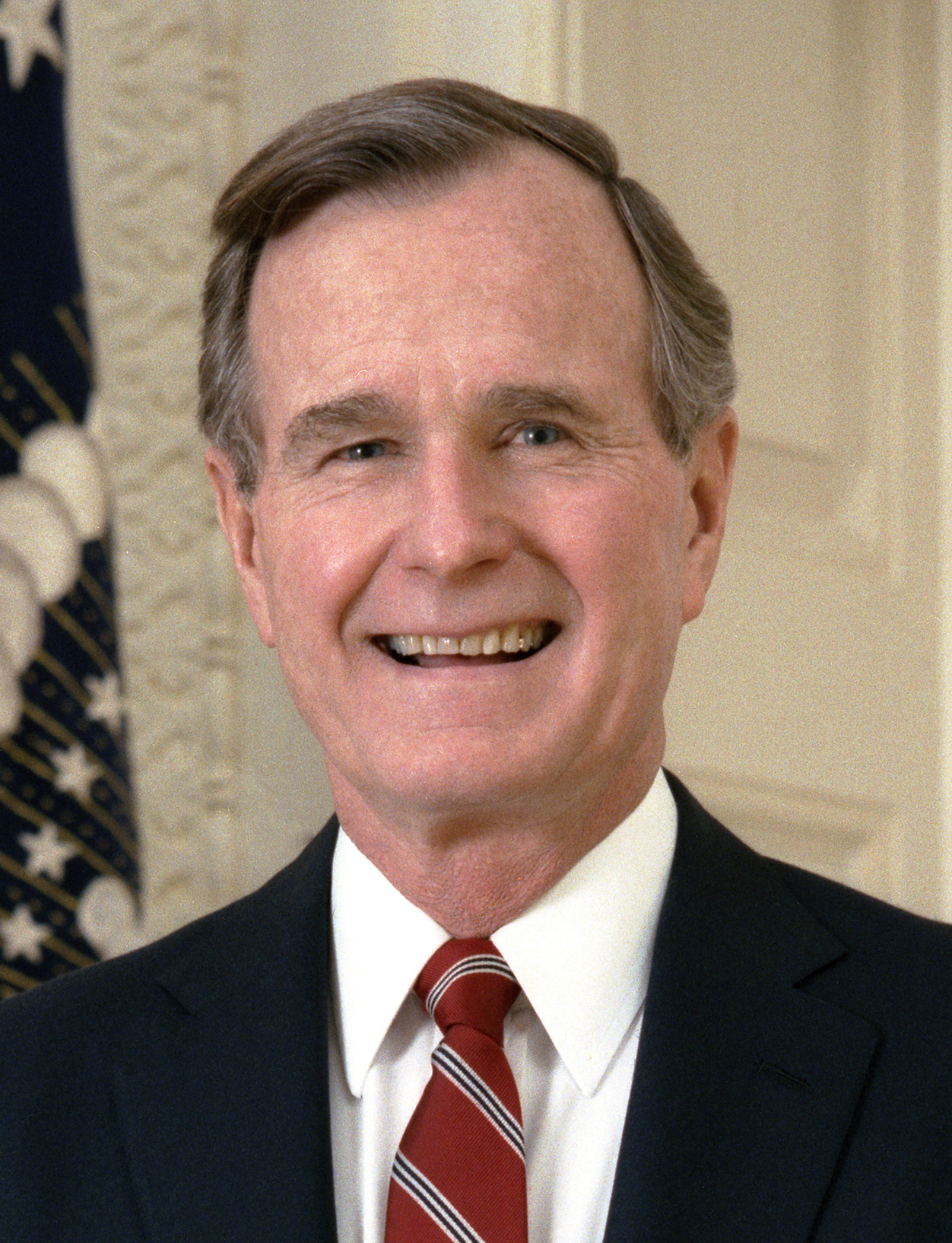

Nominee	George H. W. Bush	Bill Clinton	Ross Perot
Party	Republican	Democratic	Independent
Home state	Texas	Arkansas	Texas
Running mate	Dan Quayle	Al Gore	James Stockdale
Electoral vote	8	0	0
Popular vote	592,929	473,066	319,878
Percentage	42.65%	34.02%	23.01%
County results
Bush
30–40%
40–50%
50–60%
Clinton
30–40%
40–50%
50–60%
President before election
George H. W. Bush
Republican
Elected President
Bill Clinton
Democratic

The 1992 United States presidential election in Oklahoma took place on November 3, 1992, as part of the 1992 United States presidential election. Voters chose eight representatives, or electors to the Electoral College, who voted for president and vice president.

Oklahoma was won by incumbent President George H. W. Bush (R-Texas) with 42.65 percent of the popular vote over Governor Bill Clinton (D-Arkansas) with 34.02 percent. Businessman Ross Perot (I-Texas) finished in third, with 23.01 percent of the popular vote. Clinton ultimately won the national vote, defeating both incumbent President Bush and Perot. As of the 2024 presidential election, this is the last election in which Beckham County, Delaware County, Washita County, and Stephens County voted for a Democratic presidential candidate. This was the first time that the Democrats won the White House without Jackson County and the first time since Oklahoma statehood that a losing Republican managed to carry any of the 10 counties bordering the Red River. This is the most recent time that a Democrat has carried a majority of Oklahoma's counties in a presidential election.

== Campaign ==
Perot was required to submit 35,132 signatures to appear on the ballot. His campaign submitted over 124,000 signatures on June 19, 1992, and qualified to appear on the ballot on July 13. 106,127 signatures were validated.

== Results ==
1992 United States presidential election in Oklahoma
Party	Candidate	Votes	Percentage	Electoral votes
Republican	George H. W. Bush (incumbent)	592,929	42.65%	8
Democratic	Bill Clinton	473,066	34.02%	0
Independent	Ross Perot	319,878	23.01%	0
Libertarian	Andre Marrou	4,486	0.32%	0
Totals		1,390,359	100.0%	8
Voter turnout (Voting age/Registered Voters)				60%/60%

=== Results by county ===
County	George H.W. Bush Republican		Bill Clinton Democratic		Ross Perot Independent		Andre Marrou Libertarian		Margin		Total votes cast
County	#	%	#	%	#	%	#	%	#	%	Total votes cast
Adair	2,994	45.48%	2,645	40.18%	914	13.88%	30	0.46%	349	5.30%	6,583
Alfalfa	1,567	51.46%	741	24.33%	722	23.71%	15	0.49%	826	27.13%	3,045
Atoka	1,561	30.21%	2,336	45.21%	1,255	24.29%	15	0.29%	-775	-15.00%	5,167
Beaver	1,699	59.61%	580	20.35%	565	19.82%	6	0.21%	1,119	39.26%	2,850
Beckham	2,913	37.25%	2,947	37.69%	1,929	24.67%	31	0.40%	-34	-0.44%	7,820
Blaine	2,209	43.73%	1,564	30.96%	1,258	24.90%	21	0.42%	645	12.77%	5,052
Bryan	3,452	25.63%	6,259	46.47%	3,713	27.57%	44	0.33%	2,546 (Note: In this county where Perot ran ahead of Bush, margin given is Clinton vote minus Perot vote.)	-18.90%	13,468
Caddo	3,664	31.89%	4,861	42.31%	2,911	25.34%	52	0.45%	-1,197	-10.42%	11,488
Canadian	16,756	50.70%	7,215	21.83%	8,985	27.19%	94	0.28%	7,771 (Note: In this county where Perot ran ahead of Clinton, margin given is Bush vote minus Perot vote.)	23.51%	33,050
Carter	5,947	32.38%	7,171	39.04%	5,188	28.24%	62	0.34%	-1,224	-6.66%	18,368
Cherokee	4,977	32.94%	6,794	44.96%	3,297	21.82%	43	0.28%	-1,817	-12.02%	15,111
Choctaw	1,641	25.73%	3,413	53.52%	1,298	20.35%	25	0.39%	-1,772	-27.79%	6,377
Cimarron	965	59.42%	395	24.32%	254	15.64%	10	0.62%	570	35.10%	1,624
Cleveland	35,561	44.10%	24,404	30.27%	20,352	25.24%	312	0.39%	11,157	13.83%	80,629
Coal	714	25.50%	1,448	51.71%	618	22.07%	20	0.71%	-734	-26.21%	2,800
Comanche	15,704	44.21%	12,237	34.45%	7,463	21.01%	116	0.33%	3,467	9.76%	35,520
Cotton	910	29.44%	1,314	42.51%	853	27.60%	14	0.45%	-404	-13.07%	3,091
Craig	2,106	33.86%	2,780	44.70%	1,316	21.16%	17	0.27%	-674	-10.84%	6,219
Creek	10,055	39.84%	9,118	36.13%	5,984	23.71%	81	0.32%	937	3.71%	25,238
Custer	5,362	45.85%	3,540	30.27%	2,741	23.44%	51	0.44%	1,822	15.58%	11,694
Delaware	4,840	38.95%	4,842	38.97%	2,689	21.64%	55	0.44%	-2	-0.02%	12,426
Dewey	1,244	44.72%	845	30.37%	684	24.59%	9	0.32%	399	14.35%	2,782
Ellis	1,072	46.47%	594	25.75%	632	27.39%	9	0.39%	440	19.08%	2,307
Garfield	13,095	51.38%	6,720	26.37%	5,559	21.81%	111	0.44%	6,375	25.01%	25,485
Garvin	3,983	33.57%	4,811	40.55%	3,014	25.41%	55	0.46%	-828	-6.98%	11,863
Grady	6,997	39.40%	6,177	34.79%	4,528	25.50%	55	0.31%	820	4.61%	17,757
Grant	1,311	42.90%	864	28.27%	871	28.50%	10	0.33%	440	14.40%	3,056
Greer	964	34.69%	1,162	41.81%	640	23.03%	13	0.47%	-198	-7.12%	2,779
Harmon	496	30.79%	783	48.60%	326	20.24%	6	0.37%	-287	-17.81%	1,611
Harper	1,038	51.01%	486	23.88%	501	24.62%	10	0.49%	537	26.39%	2,035
Haskell	1,461	26.34%	3,069	55.34%	995	17.94%	21	0.38%	-1,608	-29.00%	5,546
Hughes	1,522	27.40%	2,850	51.31%	1,158	20.85%	24	0.43%	-1,328	-23.91%	5,554
Jackson	3,893	41.33%	3,273	34.75%	2,227	23.64%	27	0.29%	620	6.58%	9,420
Jefferson	671	22.23%	1,580	52.34%	758	25.11%	10	0.33%	822	-27.23%	3,019
Johnston	1,191	27.45%	2,096	48.31%	1,040	23.97%	12	0.28%	-905	-20.86%	4,339
Kay	9,115	39.93%	6,643	29.10%	6,984	30.59%	86	0.38%	2,131	9.34%	22,828
Kingfisher	3,479	54.27%	1,379	21.51%	1,534	23.93%	19	0.30%	1,945	30.34%	6,411
Kiowa	1,635	33.30%	2,143	43.65%	1,114	22.69%	18	0.37%	-508	-10.35%	4,910
Latimer	1,212	24.81%	2,606	53.35%	1,049	21.47%	18	0.37%	-1,394	-28.54%	4,885
LeFlore	5,850	34.90%	7,843	46.79%	3,021	18.02%	49	0.29%	-1,993	-11.89%	16,763
Lincoln	5,315	42.78%	3,904	31.43%	3,160	25.44%	44	0.35%	1,411	11.35%	12,423
Logan	6,071	43.97%	4,453	32.25%	3,239	23.46%	43	0.31%	1,618	11.72%	13,806
Love	922	25.06%	1,708	46.43%	1,033	28.08%	16	0.43%	675	-18.35%	3,679
McClain	4,377	40.62%	3,378	31.35%	2,996	27.80%	25	0.23%	999	9.27%	10,776
McCurtain	3,519	30.62%	5,082	44.21%	2,852	24.81%	41	0.36%	-1,563	-13.59%	11,494
McIntosh	2,225	28.19%	4,184	53.01%	1,469	18.61%	15	0.19%	-1,959	-24.82%	7,893
Major	2,154	57.36%	731	19.47%	857	22.82%	13	0.35%	1,297	34.54%	3,755
Marshall	1,478	26.88%	2,519	45.82%	1,486	27.03%	15	0.27%	1,033	-18.79%	5,498
Mayes	5,445	35.89%	6,432	42.40%	3,235	21.32%	59	0.39%	-987	-6.51%	15,171
Murray	1,536	27.49%	2,594	46.42%	1,447	25.89%	11	0.20%	-1,058	-18.93%	5,588
Muskogee	8,782	31.44%	13,619	48.76%	5,454	19.53%	77	0.28%	-4,837	-17.32%	27,932
Noble	2,474	46.83%	1,333	25.23%	1,449	27.43%	27	0.51%	1,025	19.40%	5,283
Nowata	1,531	33.84%	1,912	42.26%	1,063	23.50%	18	0.40%	-381	-8.42%	4,524
Okfuskee	1,580	34.13%	2,141	46.24%	889	19.20%	20	0.43%	-561	-12.11%	4,630
Oklahoma	126,788	48.78%	76,271	29.34%	56,139	21.60%	725	0.28%	50,517	19.44%	259,923
Okmulgee	4,586	29.74%	7,767	50.37%	3,013	19.54%	55	0.36%	-3,181	-20.63%	15,421
Osage	5,891	34.01%	6,894	39.80%	4,477	25.85%	60	0.35%	-1,003	-5.79%	17,322
Ottawa	4,141	31.35%	6,304	47.73%	2,721	20.60%	43	0.33%	-2,163	-16.38%	13,209
Pawnee	2,675	38.36%	2,612	37.46%	1,656	23.75%	30	0.43%	63	0.90%	6,973
Payne	13,032	42.20%	9,886	32.01%	7,852	25.43%	110	0.36%	3,146	10.19%	30,880
Pittsburg	5,659	30.06%	8,523	45.27%	4,594	24.40%	51	0.27%	-2,864	-15.21%	18,827
Pontotoc	5,206	33.54%	6,350	40.91%	3,916	25.23%	49	0.32%	-1,144	-7.37%	15,521
Pottawatomie	10,350	40.47%	8,616	33.69%	6,520	25.50%	86	0.34%	1,734	6.78%	25,572
Pushmataha	1,319	26.93%	2,553	52.13%	1,000	20.42%	25	0.51%	-1,234	-25.20%	4,897
Roger Mills	890	40.96%	767	35.30%	505	23.24%	11	0.51%	123	5.66%	2,173
Rogers	12,455	44.65%	8,257	29.60%	7,101	25.46%	79	0.28%	4,198	15.05%	27,892
Seminole	3,253	31.77%	4,624	45.16%	2,330	22.75%	33	0.32%	-1,371	-13.39%	10,240
Sequoyah	4,925	36.33%	6,092	44.94%	2,486	18.34%	53	0.39%	-1,167	-8.61%	13,556
Stephens	7,085	34.61%	7,644	37.34%	5,692	27.81%	50	0.24%	-559	-2.73%	20,471
Texas	4,059	58.15%	1,487	21.30%	1,417	20.30%	17	0.24%	2,572	36.85%	6,980
Tillman	1,377	32.96%	1,749	41.86%	1,039	24.87%	13	0.31%	-372	-8.90%	4,178
Tulsa	117,465	49.13%	71,165	29.77%	49,760	20.81%	678	0.28%	46,300	19.36%	239,068
Wagoner	9,053	42.05%	7,041	32.70%	5,381	24.99%	54	0.25%	2,012	9.35%	21,529
Washington	11,342	47.93%	6,593	27.86%	5,664	23.94%	64	0.27%	4,749	20.07%	23,663
Washita	1,912	35.81%	1,929	36.13%	1,468	27.50%	30	0.56%	-17	-0.32%	5,339
Woods	2,225	46.58%	1,361	28.49%	1,167	24.43%	24	0.50%	864	18.09%	4,777
Woodward	4,006	46.99%	2,063	24.20%	2,411	28.28%	46	0.54%	1,595	18.71%	8,526
Totals	592,929	42.65%	473,066	34.02%	319,878	23.01%	4,486	0.32%	119,863	8.63%	1,390,359

==== Counties that flipped from Republican to Democratic ====
- Beckham
- Carter
- Delaware
- LeFlore
- Pontotoc
- Sequoyah
- Stephens
- Washita

== Slates of Electors ==
Democrat: Earl E. Abernathy, Carl Albert, Obera Bergdall, Carolyn Crump, Lynn D. Hall, Glorine Henley, Grace Hudlin, Pete White

Republican: Jana Barker, Linda Blaylock, Ed Calhoon, Betty Casey, Allan Goodbary, Warren Roberts, Paul Thornbrugh, Dorothy Zumwalt,

Libertarian: Michael Alan Clem, Phillip R. Denney, Anne Hill Fruits, Randy Lee Gann, Vanessa C. McNeill, Brian J. Sullivan, David J. Walker, Paul O. Woodward

Independent: Pat Bigelow, Kathryn Fanning, Joe D. Sewell, A. D. Hollingsworth, A. R. Posey, John Sanders, Robert T. Jones, Jeanie Wolfgram

== See also ==
- United States presidential elections in Oklahoma
- Presidency of Bill Clinton
