= Peter R. Hofstätter =

Peter R. Hofstätter (born 1913 in Vienna; died 1994 in Buxtehude) was an Austrian social psychologist whose books on group dynamics, social psychology and general psychology were widely read in the German-speaking countries from the 1960s to the 1980s.

The only child of Robert Matthias Hofstätter, M.D., a professor of gynecology at the University of Vienna, he studied physics and psychology in Vienna and received his doctoral degree for a dissertation on the development of Japanese and Korean children. A disciple of Egon Brunswik and Charlotte and Karl Bühler, he became the president of the Academic Association for Medical Schools and displayed a considerable interest in the applications of psychology. In this context, he enjoyed contacts with psychoanalysts including Alfred Adler and psychotherapists such as Viktor Frankl. His first published paper focused on psychoanalysis.

From 1937 to 1943, he served as an army psychologist initially in the Austrian Federal Army and after 1938 in the German Wehrmacht. Endorsing to various degrees the views of the National Socialists, he subsequently worked in the Reichsjustizministerium (Justice Ministry). Despite his former support for the National Socialist regime he was allowed to teach at the university in Graz beginning in 1947. From 1949 to 1956, he taught in the U.S. at the Massachusetts Institute of Technology (M.I.T.) and the Catholic University of America in Washington, D.C. In 1956 he returned to Germany to become the first German professor of social psychology at the College for Social Sciences in Wilhelmshaven. Beginning in 1959, he held the Lehrstuhl für Psychologie and served as department chair at the University of Hamburg, from which he retired in 1979.

In the 1950s to 1970s, Hofstätter was considered the most prominent social psychologist in the German-speaking countries. Publishing thirteen books focusing on methodology and social psychology, he helped German psychology to become reconnected to international psychology while moving it away from the more speculative and humanities-oriented approach favored by many German psychologists in the 1920s and 1930s. Publishing in 1957 the widely read Fischer-Lexikon Psychologie, as well as Gruppendynamik he was instrumental in "Americanizing" the field which as a consequence became much more empirically oriented. He also succeeded in integrating wide-ranging and historically informed perspectives into his approach to psychology. At the same time his activities as a columnist for the newspaper Hamburger Abendblatt and the weekly magazine Die Zeit made him nationally prominent but also involved him in a bitter controversy when he argued in favor of a general amnesty for German war criminals.

== Books ==
- Die Psychologie der öffentlichen Meinung [The psychology of public opinion]. Vienna, Austria: Braumüller, 1949.
- Psychologie [Psychology]. Frankfurt/M., Germany: S. Fischer Verlag, 1957.
- Differentielle Psychologie [Differential psychology]. Stuttgart, Germany: Kröner, 1971.
- Sozialpsychologie [Social psychology]. Berlin, Germany: de Gruyter, 1973. ISBN 3-11-004309-2
- Quantitative Methoden der Psychologie I [Quantitative methods in psychology 1] (with Dirk Wendt). Heidelberg, Germany: Springer, 1974 ISBN 3-540-79602-9.
- Individuum und Gesellschaft [Individual and society]. Berlin, Germany: Ullstein, 1984 ISBN 3-548-02955-8.
- Gruppendynamik. Kritik der Massenpsychologie [Group dynamics: A criticism of mass psychology]. Hamburg, Germany 1957; Reinbek, Germany: Rowohlt, 1985 ISBN 3-499-55038-5.
- Deutsche Wehrmachtpsychologie 1914 - 1945 [Psychology of the German Armed Forces 1914-1945]. Introduction by P. R. Hofstätter. Munich, Germany: Verlag für Wehrwissenschaften, 1985 ISBN 3-8219-0019-9 und 3821900164.
- Bedingungen der Zufriedenheit [Conditions for contentment]. Zürich, Switzerland: Edition Interfrom, 1986 ISBN 3-7201-5192-1.
- Persönlichkeitsforschung [Personality research]. Stuttgart, Germany: Kröner, 1991 ISBN 3-520-40302-1.
- Einführung in die Sozialpsychologie [Introduction to social psychology]. Stuttgart, Germany: Kröner, 1990 ISBN 3-520-29505-9.
