= Tushka, Oklahoma =

Town in Oklahoma, US

- Town
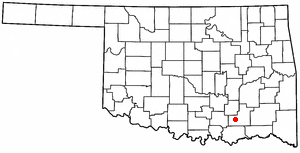
- Location of Tushka, Oklahoma
- Coordinates: 34°19′07″N 96°10′02″W
- Country: United States
- State: Oklahoma
- County: Atoka

Area
  - Total: 0.76 sq mi (1.96 km^{2})
  - Land: 0.76 sq mi (1.96 km^{2})
  - Water: 0 sq mi (0.00 km^{2})
- Elevation: 614 ft (187 m)

Population (2020)
  - Total: 413
  - Density: 545.9/sq mi (210.76/km^{2})
- Time zone: UTC-6 (Central (CST))
  - Summer (DST): UTC-5 (CDT)
- FIPS code: 40-75250
- GNIS feature ID: 2413406

Tushka is a town in Atoka County, Oklahoma, United States. The population was 413 as of the 2020 Census, a 32.4% increase over the 312 reported at the 2010 census.

== History ==
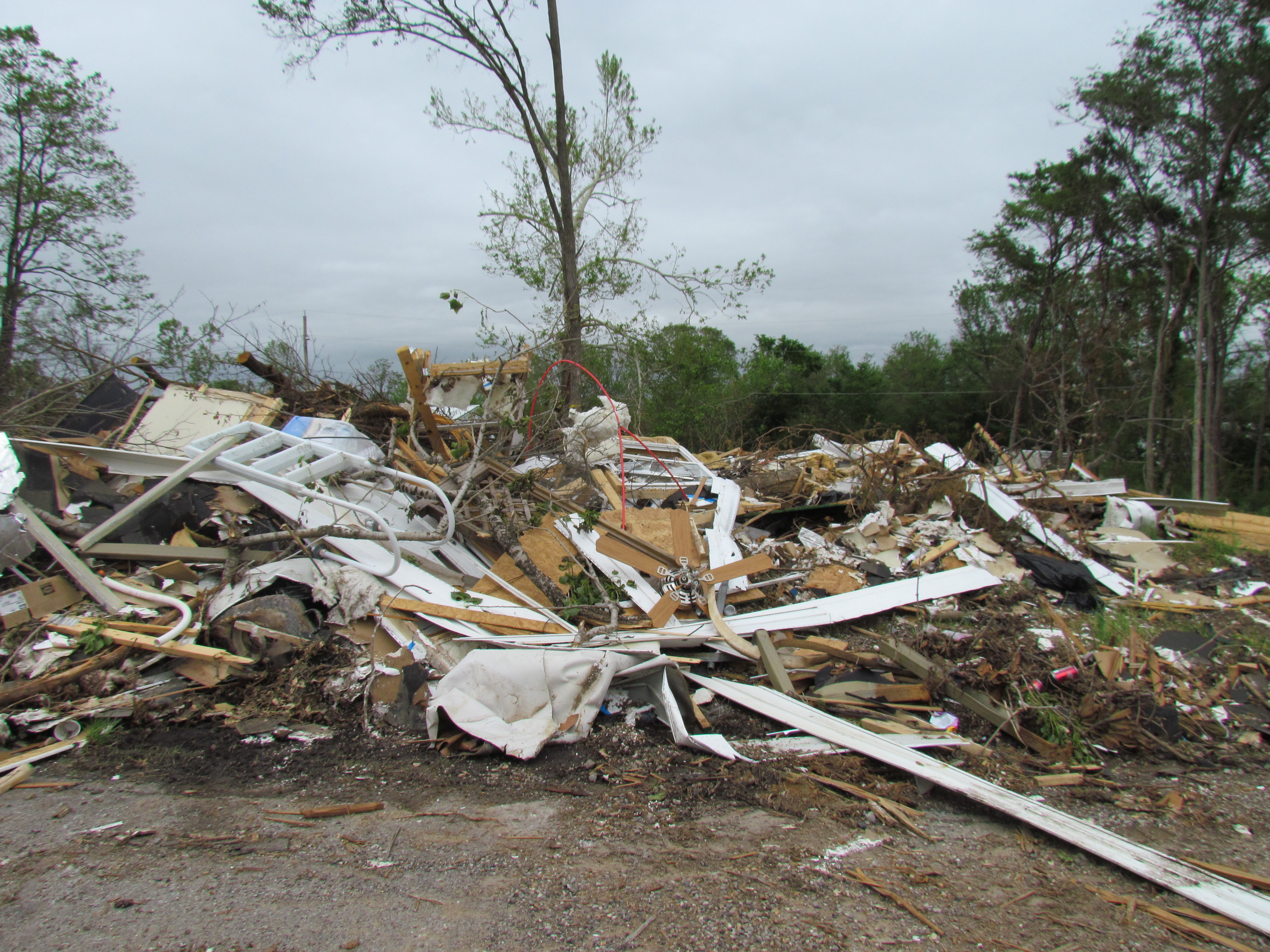
Tornado damage, 2011

In 1872, the Missouri-Kansas-Texas Railway (Katy) built a track five miles south of Atoka in Atoka County, Choctaw Nation in the Indian Territory and created a settlement which it called Peck Switch, Indian Territory. The first post office was established in 1903. The name was changed to Lewis in 1905, honoring the first postmaster, Charles Lewis. In 1909, the community was renamed Dayton, but was changed during the same year to the present Tushka. Tushka is a Choctaw word meaning "warrior".

Tushka was first incorporated in 1915, but disincorporated after 15 years. There were 248 residents at the 1920 census. A fire destroyed most of the town during the Great Depression. During World War II, many of the remaining residents moved to California for work and never returned. The town incorporated again in 1968. Its population had recovered to 230 in 1970.

Tushka was hit by a tornado on April 14, 2011, causing damage to much of the town, including the school, and causing two deaths.

== Geography ==
According to the United States Census Bureau, the town has a total area of 0.7 square miles (1.8 km^{2}), of which 0.7 square miles (1.8 km^{2}) is land and 0.04 square miles (0.10 km^{2}) (2.70%) is water.

Tushka is located along U.S. Highway 69/75.

== Demographics ==
Historical population
| Census | Pop. | Note | %± |
|---|---|---|---|
| 1970 | 230 | | — |
| 1980 | 358 | | 55.7% |
| 1990 | 256 | | −28.5% |
| 2000 | 377 | | 47.3% |
| 2010 | 312 | | −17.2% |
| 2020 | 413 | | 32.4% |
U.S. Decennial Census

=== 2020 census ===
As of the 2020 census, Tushka had a population of 413. The median age was 31.1 years. 30.3% of residents were under the age of 18 and 16.7% of residents were 65 years of age or older. For every 100 females there were 89.4 males, and for every 100 females age 18 and over there were 83.4 males age 18 and over.

All residents lived in rural areas.

There were 175 households in Tushka, of which 36.6% had children under the age of 18 living in them. Of all households, 26.9% were married-couple households, 24.0% were households with a male householder and no spouse or partner present, and 42.3% were households with a female householder and no spouse or partner present. About 38.9% of all households were made up of individuals and 14.9% had someone living alone who was 65 years of age or older.

There were 205 housing units, of which 14.6% were vacant. The homeowner vacancy rate was 2.8% and the rental vacancy rate was 7.8%.

Racial composition as of the 2020 census
| Race | Number | Percent |
|---|---|---|
| White | 268 | 64.9% |
| Black or African American | 8 | 1.9% |
| American Indian and Alaska Native | 84 | 20.3% |
| Asian | 2 | 0.5% |
| Native Hawaiian and Other Pacific Islander | 0 | 0.0% |
| Some other race | 4 | 1.0% |
| Two or more races | 47 | 11.4% |
| Hispanic or Latino (of any race) | 27 | 6.5% |

=== 2000 census ===
As of the census of 2000, there were 345 people, 139 households, and 94 families residing in the town. The population density was 479.2 inhabitants per square mile (185.0/km^{2}). There were 162 housing units at an average density of 225.0 per square mile (86.9/km^{2}). The racial makeup of the town was 72.46% White, 19.71% Native American, 0.29% from other races, and 7.54% from two or more races. Hispanic or Latino of any race were 2.03% of the population.

There were 139 households, out of which 32.4% had children under the age of 18 living with them, 48.2% were married couples living together, 15.8% had a female householder with no husband present, and 31.7% were non-families. 28.1% of all households were made up of individuals, and 13.7% had someone living alone who was 65 years of age or older. The average household size was 2.48 and the average family size was 3.03.

In the town, the population was spread out, with 27.5% under the age of 18, 12.5% from 18 to 24, 27.2% from 25 to 44, 20.3% from 45 to 64, and 12.5% who were 65 years of age or older. The median age was 34 years. For every 100 females, there were 98.3 males. For every 100 females age 18 and over, there were 95.3 males.

The median income for a household in the town was $17,404, and the median income for a family was $26,250. Males had a median income of $18,438 versus $15,357 for females. The per capita income for the town was $10,547. About 19.8% of families and 17.5% of the population were below the poverty line, including 23.9% of those under age 18 and 16.7% of those age 65 or over.
