= Stringtown, Oklahoma =

Town in Oklahoma, US

- Town
- A view of the town in 1978 looking towards the old post office

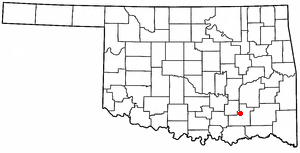
- Location of Stringtown, Oklahoma
- Coordinates: 34°28′12″N 96°03′18″W
- Country: United States
- State: Oklahoma
- County: Atoka

Government
  - Mayor and Chairman of Water Department: Robert Smith

Area
  - Total: 5.44 sq mi (14.09 km^{2})
  - Land: 5.39 sq mi (13.95 km^{2})
  - Water: 0.054 sq mi (0.14 km^{2})
- Elevation: 653 ft (199 m)

Population (2020)
  - Total: 419
  - Density: 77.8/sq mi (30.03/km^{2})
- Time zone: UTC-6 (CST)
  - Summer (DST): UTC-5 (CDT)
- ZIP code: 74569
- Area code: 580
- FIPS code: 40-70850
- GNIS feature ID: 2413343

Stringtown is a town in Atoka County, Oklahoma, United States. The population was 419 as of the 2020 Census, which was a 2.2% increase over the population of 410 reported at the 2010 census, which itself was an increase of 3.5% from the figure of 396 recorded in 2000. It is the second largest town in Atoka County.

The town is notable for the Mack H. Alford Correctional Center, a medium-security prison operated by the Oklahoma Department of Corrections, just outside Stringtown.

== Geography ==
According to the United States Census Bureau, the town has a total area of 4.7 square miles (12.2 km^{2}), of which 4.7 square miles (12.1 km^{2}) is land and 0.077 square miles (0.2 km^{2}), or 1.24%, is water.

Stringtown is located at the southern intersection of U.S. Highway 69 and State Highway 43.

== History ==
The abandoned dance hall where Deputy Eugene C. Moore was shot and killed by the Barrow Gang in 1932

Sources differ as to the origins of the name: one suggests the original name was Springtown for a local sulphur spring but a spelling mistake labeled it Stringtown, while another suggests it got the name because businesses were strung out along the railroad tracks. Once home to a bank, theater, and pub, the town has grown recently, both economically and in population. Population growth since the 1990 census, companies noticing business opportunities in game hunting, and the addition of a new café have brought new life to the town. Annually in September, the Good Ole Days Festival celebrates the town's past with a parade, cookout, and concert.

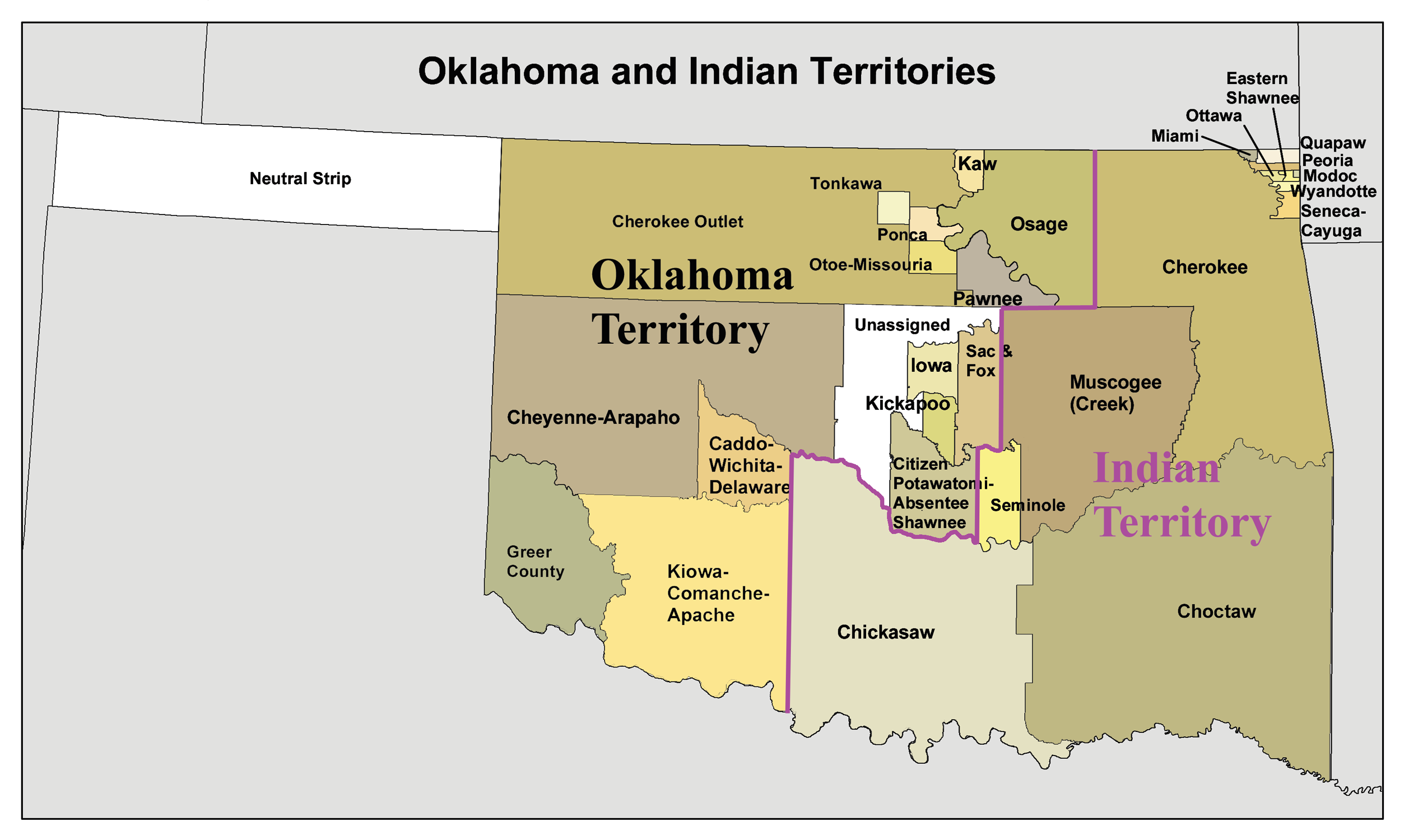
Oklahoma and Indian Territory, 1890s

A post office was established at Stringtown, Indian Territory on August 17, 1874. For a few weeks in July 1877 the official name of the post office was Sulphur Springs, Indian Territory. At the time of its founding, Stringtown was located in Atoka County, Choctaw Nation, a territorial-era government unit that included parts of today's Atoka, Coal, Hughes, and Pittsburg counties.

On August 5, 1932, while Bonnie Parker was visiting her mother, Clyde Barrow and two associates were drinking alcohol at a dance in Stringtown (illegal under Prohibition). They were approached by Sheriff C. G. Maxwell and his deputy, at which time Clyde opened fire, killing deputy Eugene C. Moore. That was the first killing of a lawman by what was later known as the Barrow Gang, who would go on to kill a total of nine officers.

In the 1940s during World War II, Fritz Johann Hansgirg, the Austrian inventor of magnesium and heavy water processes was interned at the U.S. alien internment camp located in Stringtown.

In the late 1960s, a tornado touched down in the town directly on top of the (then) recently built Community Center, now the Senior Citizens Center. The tornado was only on the ground for a few seconds, but during that time the building was almost destroyed. It was an unusual occurrence for a tornado to touch down in the town itself, given its location between two chains of steep hills.

The nearby Mack Alford State Penitentiary is a large source of employment in the county. It was an internment camp for Japanese Americans arrested as "enemy aliens" and later for German POWs during World War II.

Despite its small size, Stringtown (2010 pop. 410) is the second-largest town in Atoka County, behind Atoka (pop. 3,107) and ahead of Tushka (pop. 312). On January 14, 2014, the Oklahoma Highway Patrol disbanded the Stringtown Police Department for generating too much of the city’s revenue off of writing traffic tickets, a violation of the state "speed trap" law.

The Garside house is one of the biggest historical sites of the town, next to the Bonnie and Clyde monument. The land the Garside house sits on was allotted to Joseph and Sarah Garside and their two children in 1902. In the middle of building the house, a tornado came through the town and tore down the part of the house that had been built. The Garsides had to start over again, but in 1915 they finished a two-story house. The house and land was later purchased by E. H. Colbertson, the first white man to buy land in that area. Approximately four years ago, the house was remodeled and decorated to be a museum.

The Southwest Stone Company, also known as the Rock Crusher, is one of the biggest sources of employment in the county. The crusher moved from Chockee to Stringtown in the early 1900s. Up until that point, Stringtown did not have electricity.

The Missouri, Kansas, & Texas Railway (later named the Missouri-Kansas-Texas Railroad, and nicknamed "the Katy") was built through Stringtown in 1872, as part of its route between Parsons, Kansas and Dallas, Texas. The MKT was merged into the Union Pacific Railroad in 1988.

Stringtown was once home to a sawmill and a cotton gin that had the biggest production rate in the late 1800s. When a fire burnt the town on July 15, 1954, the sawmill and cotton gin burned down, along with half the town, including a café, a jailhouse, a barbershop, a bank, and a hotel. All that was left was Robert’s Store and a few homes. The town never rebuilt many of these buildings, simply building new ones as the town has grown in more recent years. Today, there is a school, a church, a fire department, City Hall, Dianna’s Store, and a senior citizens center.

== Government and infrastructure ==
The old Stringtown Post Office, which was demolished early in the 1990s as it had become structurally unsound.

The United States Postal Service operates the Stringtown Post Office.

The Oklahoma Department of Corrections operates the Mack Alford Correctional Center in an unincorporated area in Atoka County, near Stringtown.

== Demographics ==
Historical population
Census	Pop.	Note	%±
1920	360		—
1930	558		55.0%
1940	718		28.7%
1950	499		−30.5%
1960	414		−17.0%
1970	397		−4.1%
1980	1,047		163.7%
1990	366		−65.0%
2000	396		8.2%
2010	410		3.5%
2020	419		2.2%
U.S. Decennial Census

=== 2020 census ===
As of the 2020 census, Stringtown had a population of 419. The median age was 40.5 years. 25.3% of residents were under the age of 18 and 22.0% of residents were 65 years of age or older. For every 100 females there were 103.4 males, and for every 100 females age 18 and over there were 101.9 males age 18 and over.

0.0% of residents lived in urban areas, while 100.0% lived in rural areas.

There were 164 households in Stringtown, of which 32.9% had children under the age of 18 living in them. Of all households, 47.0% were married-couple households, 17.1% were households with a male householder and no spouse or partner present, and 25.0% were households with a female householder and no spouse or partner present. About 19.5% of all households were made up of individuals and 12.2% had someone living alone who was 65 years of age or older.

There were 220 housing units, of which 25.5% were vacant. The homeowner vacancy rate was 3.0% and the rental vacancy rate was 34.6%.

Racial composition as of the 2020 census
Race	Number	Percent
White	266	63.5%
Black or African American	8	1.9%
American Indian and Alaska Native	69	16.5%
Asian	0	0.0%
Native Hawaiian and Other Pacific Islander	0	0.0%
Some other race	3	0.7%
Two or more races	73	17.4%
Hispanic or Latino (of any race)	6	1.4%

=== 2000 census ===
As of the census of 2000, there were 396 people, 166 households, and 113 families residing in the town. The population density was 83.7 inhabitants per square mile (32.3/km^{2}). There were 217 housing units at an average density of 45.9 per square mile (17.7/km^{2}). The racial makeup of the town was 69.95% White, 11.36% African American, 10.35% Native American, 0.25% Asian, 0.25% Pacific Islander, and 7.83% from two or more races.

There were 166 households, out of which 26.5% had children under the age of 18 living with them, 54.2% were married couples living together, 10.8% had a female householder with no husband present, and 31.9% were non-families. 28.9% of all households were made up of individuals, and 14.5% had someone living alone who was 65 years of age or older. The average household size was 2.39 and the average family size was 2.89.

In the town, the population was spread out, with 24.0% under the age of 18, 9.6% from 18 to 24, 21.2% from 25 to 44, 27.5% from 45 to 64, and 17.7% who were 65 years of age or older. The median age was 42 years. For every 100 females, there were 103.1 males. For every 100 females age 18 and over, there were 89.3 males.

The median income for a household in the town was $20,536, and the median income for a family was $22,614. Males had a median income of $19,643 versus $14,861 for females. The per capita income for the town was $9,612. About 15.1% of families and 25.1% of the population were below the poverty line, including 45.0% of those under age 18 and 30.9% of those age 65 or over.

== Education ==
It is in the Stringtown Public Schools school district.

== Notable people ==
- Jerry Cantrell, guitar player for Alice in Chains
- B.A. Garside, executive director of United China Relief
- Reba McEntire, country singer
- Tyrus McGee (born 1991), basketball player in the Israel Basketball Premier League
- Crystal Robinson, former professional basketball player WNBA
- U.L. Washington, former professional baseball player
