= Lake Atoka Reservoir =

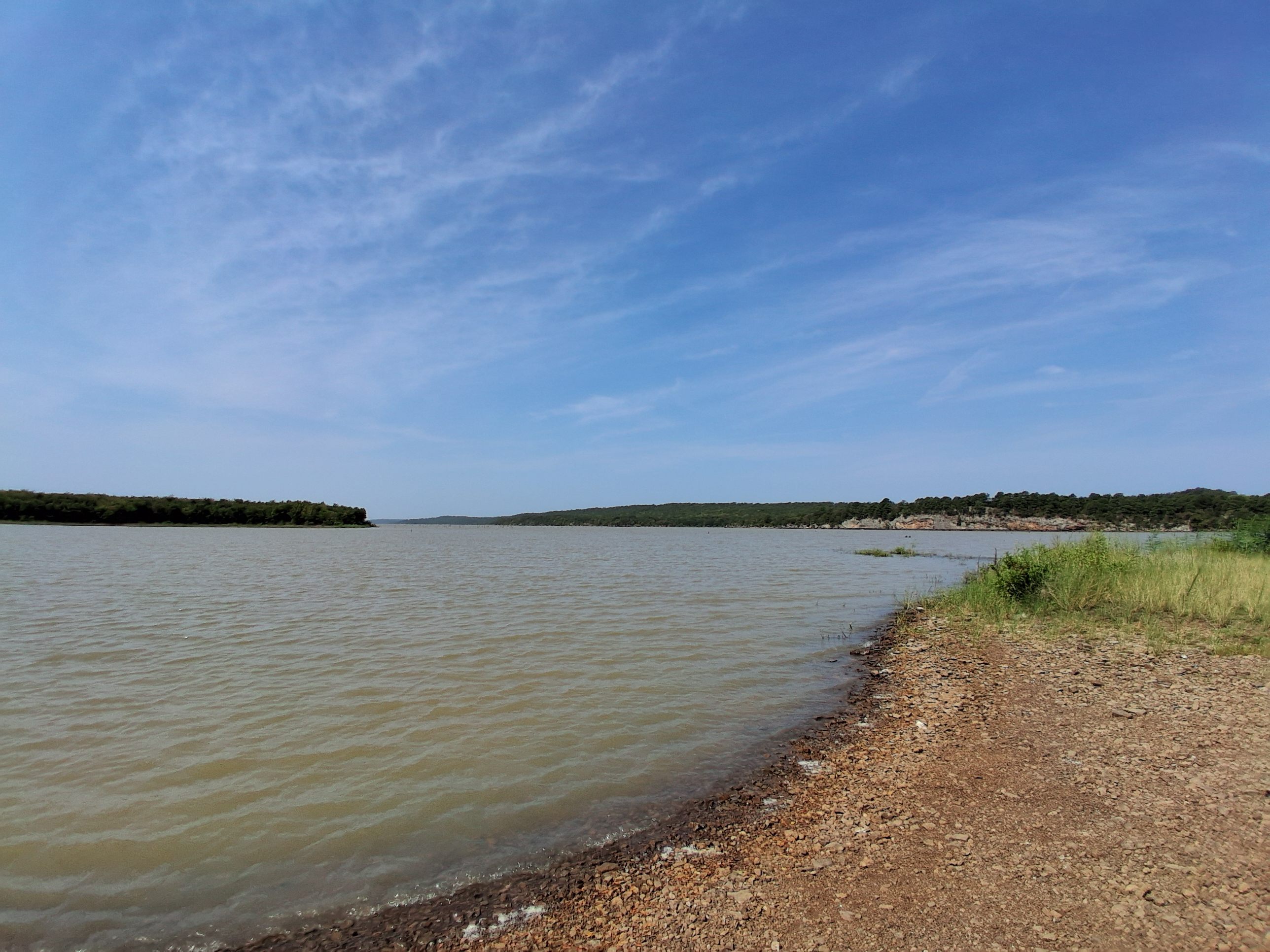
- Lake Atoka Reservoir in 2026

- Location within Oklahoma Location within the United States
- Location: Atoka County, Oklahoma, United States
- Coordinates: 34°27′07″N 96°05′26″W
- Type: Reservoir
- Basin countries: United States
- Max. length: 9.3 mi (15 km)
- Surface area: 5,700 acres (2,300 ha)
- Average depth: 85 ft (26 m)
- Water volume: 105,195 acre⋅ft (0.129756 km^{3})
- Shore length^{1}: 43 mi (70 km)
- Surface elevation: 590 ft (180 m)
- Settlements: Atoka, Oklahoma
- ^{1} Shore length is not a well-defined measure.

Lake Atoka Reservoir (also called Atoka Lake) is a reservoir in southeastern Oklahoma, 4 miles (6.4 km) north of Atoka, Oklahoma, county seat of Atoka County, Oklahoma. It was built in 1959 to expand the water supply for Lake Stanley Draper in Oklahoma City and Atoka.

== Description ==
The lake has a surface area of 5,700 acres (23,000,000 m^{2}), an average depth of 26 meters (26 m), 70 miles (110 km) of shoreline and a capacity of 105,195 acre-feet (129,756,000 m^{3}). Its length is 15 kilometres (9.3 mi). (Note: LASR states that the shoreline is 60 miles (97 km) long.)

== Litigation over water rights ==
Atoka Lake is mentioned along with Sardis Lake, the Kiamichi Basin and the Clear Boggy Basin in a current court case (now known as Chickasaw v. Fallin), alleging that the state has violated the water rights of specific Native American tribes. The case was filed in 2011, and seeks to prevent of limit withdrawals of water from the named sources by the city of Oklahoma City and approved by the Oklahoma Water Resources Board.
