= Clear Boggy Creek =

River in Oklahoma, United States

Coordinates: 34°03′23″N 95°47′57″W

Clear Boggy Creek Clear Boggy River

Location
- Country: United States of America
- State: Oklahoma

Physical characteristics
- Discharge
  - location: Caney
  - average: 498 cu ft/s (14.1 m^{3}/s)

Basin features
- River system: Red River of the South

Clear Boggy Creek, also known as the Clear Boggy River, is a 132-mile-long (212 km) creek in southeastern Oklahoma that is a tributary of Muddy Boggy Creek.

== Geography ==
According to some sources, Clear Boggy Creek joins with Muddy Boggy Creek to form the Boggy River. Federal topographic maps and the Geographic Names Information System show Clear Boggy Creek as a tributary to Muddy Boggy Creek, which retains its name below the confluence.

Its gradient is about 15 feet per mile near its headwaters and 3 feet per mile near Boggy Depot and below.

Water in Clear Boggy Creek is more mineralized than in Muddy Boggy Creek.

== History ==
Boggy Depot was established on Clear Boggy Creek.
