= Masonic Temple (Atoka, Oklahoma) =

- U.S. National Register of Historic Places
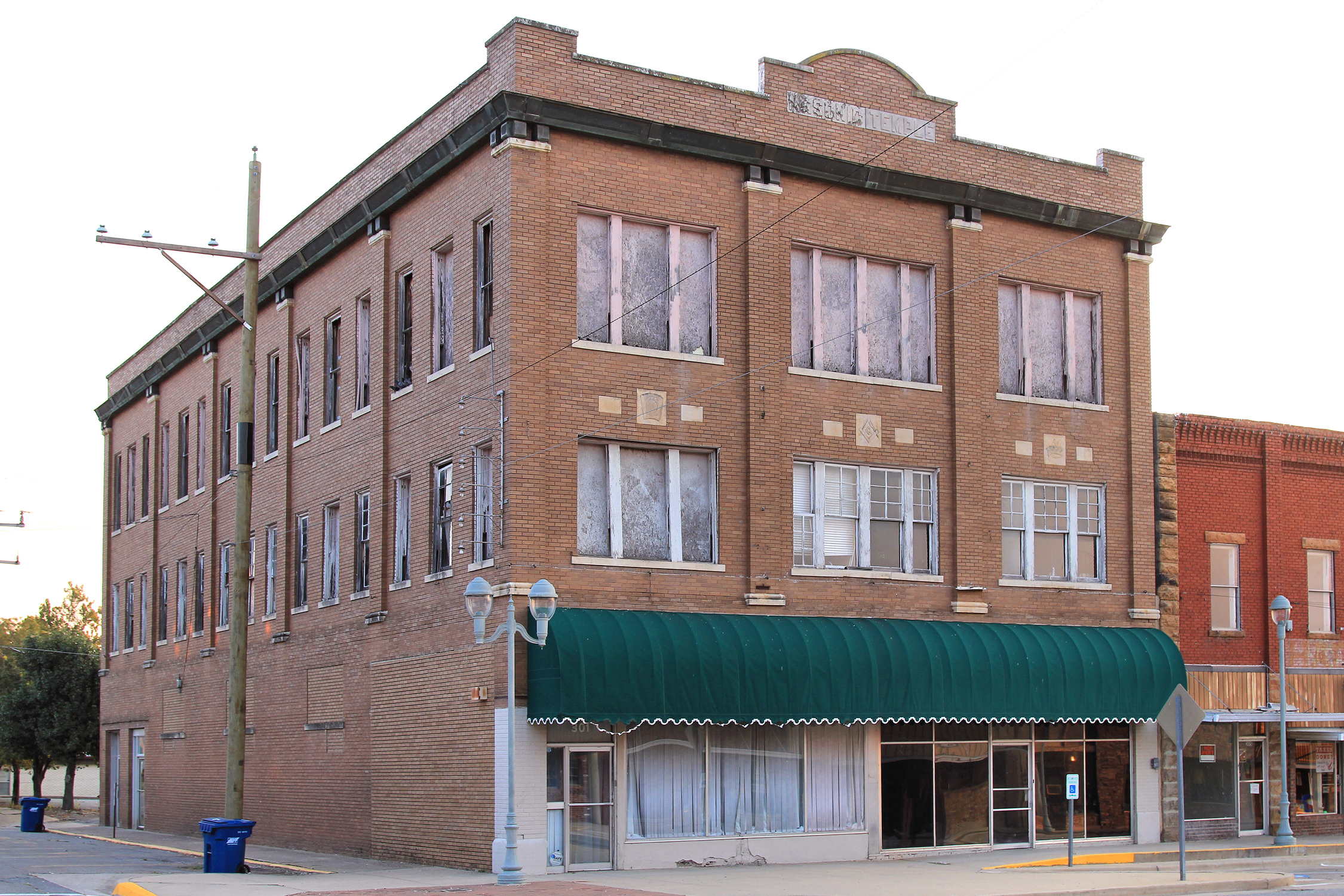

- Location within Oklahoma Location within the United States
- Location: 301 Court St., Atoka, Oklahoma
- Coordinates: 34°23′7.9″N 96°7′31.5″W
- Area: less than one acre
- Built: 1915
- Architect: Masonic Lodge
- NRHP reference No.: 80003251
- Added to NRHP: September 08, 1980

The Masonic Temple in Atoka, Oklahoma is a historic building from 1915. Originally constructed as a meeting hall for a local area Masonic lodge, it was listed on the National Register of Historic Places in 1980.

The building has stained glass windows in its third story, and is regarded as unique architecturally in its community. At the time of NRHP listing, it was regarded as a prime candidate for restoration.

In 2013 the building was a hospice.

As of 2023, the building is now home to Reba’s Place, a combination restaurant, bar, live music venue and retail store brought to life by country music superstar Reba McEntire.

While inspecting the building in 2021, McEntire and a few others became trapped when a staircase collapsed. They were evacuated from the building safely.
