= First Methodist Church Building (Atoka, Oklahoma) =

Historic church in Oklahoma, United States

- U.S. National Register of Historic Places
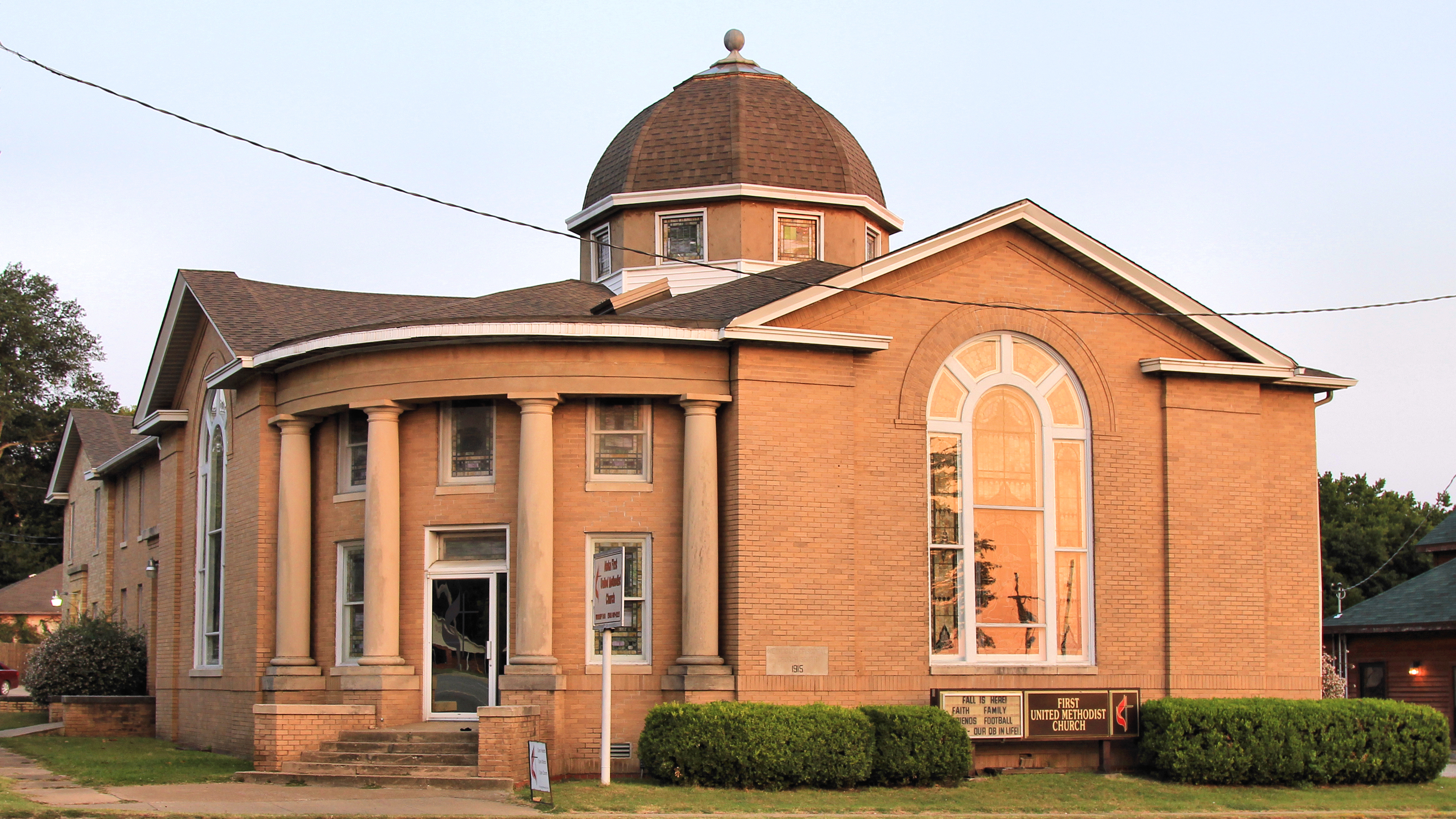

- Location within Oklahoma Location within the United States
- Location: 105 W. 1st Street, Atoka, Oklahoma
- Coordinates: 34°23′6″N 96°7′40″W
- Built: 1915
- Architectural style: Palladian
- NRHP reference No.: 80003250
- Added to NRHP: June 30, 1980

First Methodist Church Building is a historic church building at 105 W. 1st Street in Atoka, Oklahoma.

It was built in 1915 and added to the National Register in 1980.
