= DeCelis Branch =

Stream in Missouri, United States

Coordinates: 37.0753298°N 90.1917710°W

DeCelis Branch is a stream in Wayne County in the U.S. state of Missouri. It is a tributary of McGee Creek.

DeCelis Branch has the name of Sebastian de Celis, a pioneer citizen.

== See also ==
- List of rivers of Missouri
