= National Register of Historic Places listings in Coal County, Oklahoma =

Location of Coal County in Oklahoma

This is a list of the National Register of Historic Places listings in Coal County, Oklahoma.

This is intended to be a complete list of the properties on the National Register of Historic Places in Coal County, Oklahoma, United States. The locations of National Register properties for which the latitude and longitude coordinates are included below, may be seen in a map.

There are 5 properties listed on the National Register in the county.

This National Park Service list is complete through NPS recent listings posted October 23, 2026.

== Current listings ==
	Name on the Register	Image	Date listed	Location	City or town	Description
1	Coalgate School Gymnasium-Auditorium		September 8, 1988 (#88001382)	Fox and Frey Sts. 34°32′01″N 96°13′13″W	Coalgate	
2	Keel Creek Bridge		April 4, 2007 (#07000257)	State Highway 31 over Keel Creek; 34°36′34″N 96°08′42″W	Coalgate	Demolished in 2008
3	Merchants National Bank Building	Merchants National Bank Building	December 6, 2006 (#06001112)	Southwestern corner of Main and Railway Sts. 34°27′50″N 96°13′29″W	Lehigh	
4	Benjamin Franklin Smallwood House		March 10, 1982 (#82003676)	West of Lehigh; 34°27′44″N 96°16′33″W	Lehigh	
5	United States Post Office Coalgate	United States Post Office Coalgate	April 17, 2009 (#09000214)	38 N. Main St. 34°32′19″N 96°13′06″W	Coalgate	

== See also ==
- List of National Historic Landmarks in Oklahoma
- National Register of Historic Places listings in Oklahoma
