= National Register of Historic Places listings in Alfalfa County, Oklahoma =

Location of Alfalfa County in Oklahoma

This is a list of the National Register of Historic Places listings in Alfalfa County, Oklahoma.

This is intended to be a complete list of the properties on the National Register of Historic Places in Alfalfa County, Oklahoma, United States. The locations of National Register properties for which the latitude and longitude coordinates are included below, may be seen in a map.

There are 12 properties listed on the National Register in the county.

This National Park Service list is complete through NPS recent listings posted March 21, 2025.

== Current listings ==
	Name on the Register	Image	Date listed	Location	City or town	Description
1	Alfalfa County Courthouse	Alfalfa County Courthouse	August 23, 1984 (#84002937)	Grand Ave. 36°45′18″N 98°21′22″W	Cherokee	
2	Aline IOOF Lodge No. 263		March 8, 1984 (#84002941)	Off Main and Broadway; 36°30′36″N 98°27′00″W	Aline	
3	Carmen IOOF Home		March 8, 1984 (#84002944)	North of Carmen; 36°35′43″N 98°27′43″W	Carmen	
4	Carmen IOOF Lodge No. 84		March 8, 1984 (#84002948)	Main and 4th St. 36°34′45″N 98°27′30″W	Carmen	
5	Cherokee Armory		September 8, 1988 (#88001371)	E 2nd St and S Kansas Ave; 36°45′23″N 98°21′21″W	Cherokee	
6	Cherokee Friends Church	Cherokee Friends Church	December 6, 2004 (#04001337)	120 S. Pennsylvania; 36°45′25″N 98°21′14″W	Cherokee	
7	Cherokee IOOF Lodge No. 219		March 8, 1984 (#84002953)	S Grand Ave and E 2nd St; 36°45′23″N 98°21′25″W	Cherokee	
8	Farmers' Exchange Elevator		October 7, 1983 (#83004152)	State Highway 45; 36°31′57″N 98°09′15″W	Goltry	
9	Farmers' Federation Elevator		October 7, 1983 (#83004153)	Ohio Ave and W 2nd St; 36°45′23″N 98°21′34″W	Cherokee	
10	Hotel Cherokee		March 5, 1998 (#98000200)	117 W. Main; 36°45′29″N 98°21′28″W	Cherokee	
11	Ingersoll Tile Elevator	Ingersoll Tile Elevator	October 7, 1983 (#83004156)	Off U.S. Route 64; 36°47′49″N 98°23′20″W	Ingersoll	
12	Sod House	Sod House	September 29, 1970 (#70000526)	About 4 miles north of Cleo Springs; 36°28′17″N 98°25′23″W	Cleo Springs	

== See also ==
- List of National Historic Landmarks in Oklahoma
- National Register of Historic Places listings in Oklahoma
