= Owl, Oklahoma =

Town in Coal County, Oklahoma

Owl was an unincorporated community in the Indian Territory and later Coal County, Oklahoma. At the time of its founding, Owl was located in Atoka County, a part of the Pushmataha District, or province, of the Choctaw Nation.

Owl was established as a station stop on the MK&T Railroad, between Coalgate and Tupelo. After statehood, Owl was located at or near the geographic center of Coal County, a fact it sought to exploit for its benefit. According to a local newspaper, the town had two buildings in February 1904, then grew to 75 buildings and a population of 500 by January 1905.

During the latter days of the Indian Territory, as Oklahoma's statehood became a certainty, Owl promoted itself to become the county seat of the newly established Coal County. Owl residents published a new newspaper, the Coal County Register, to serve as a mouthpiece for the effort. Tupelo, Lehigh, Olney, Centrahoma, Coalgate and Phillips all vied with Owl to be county seat of the new county.

Owl's effort was an uphill climb. Each town wishing to become county seat was required to gather 300 signatures in order to make it onto the ballot. It could not, and the final ballot did not include it as a choice. Lehigh, the provisional county seat, lost the privilege to Coalgate. At the time of the election, Lehigh was thought to have a population of 2,188 and Coalgate was thought to have as many as 2,921.
