= List of bridges on the National Register of Historic Places in Oklahoma =

This is a list of bridges and tunnels on the National Register of Historic Places in the U.S. state of Oklahoma.

| Name | Image | Built | Listed | Location | County | Type |
|---|---|---|---|---|---|---|
| Bridge No. 18 at Rock Creek | Rock Creek Bridge | 1924, 1926 | 1995-02-23 | Sapulpa; 35°59′37″N 96°8′11″W | Creek | Parker Through Truss |
| Bridgeport Bridge | | 1933 | 2020-11-30 | Bridgeport; 35°32′29.4″N 98°19′14.9″W | Caddo | Parker pony truss (38-span) |
| Captain Creek Bridge | | 1933 | 2004-03-03 | Wellston; 35°41′35″N 97°4′16″W | Lincoln | Camel Pony Truss |
| Choctaw, Oklahoma and Gulf Railroad Viaduct | | 1902, 1909, 1913 | 2007-12-11 | Ardmore; 34°10′51″N 97°07′05″W | Carter | Wood Trestle-Plate Girder |
| Eleventh Street Arkansas River Bridge | | 1915 | 1996-12-13 | Tulsa; 36°8′28″N 96°0′21″W | Tulsa | multiple-span concrete bridge |
| Horse Creek Bridge | | 1936 | 1995-02-23 | Afton; 36°41′49″N 94°57′23″W | Ottawa | |
| Jenson Tunnel | | 1885 | 1976-05-13 | Cameron; 35°13′9″N 94°26′35″W | Le Flore | |
| Keel Creek Bridge | | 1940 | 2007-04-04 | Coalgate; 34°36′34″N 96°8′42″W | Coal | concrete slab bridge |
| Lake Overholser Bridge | | 1924–1926 | 2004-03-02 | Oklahoma City; 35°30′51″N 97°37′49″W | Oklahoma | Mixed Truss Bridge |
| Little Cabin Creek Bridge | Little Cabin Creek Bridge | 1934–1935 | 2009-03-04 | Vinita; 36°37′36.4″N 95°7′12.8″W | Craig | Parker pony truss |
| Little Deep Fork Creek Bridge | | 1914, 1926, 1928 | 2003-12-05 | Bristow; 35°48′49″N 96°26′6″W | Creek | Bedstead Warren Pony Truss |
| Long Branch Creek Bridge | | 1910 | 2014-09-10 | Stillwater; 36°13′58.2″N 97°07′25.7″W | Payne | Pratt pony truss |
| Morrison Suspension Bridge | | 1917 | 1980-05-23 | Morrison; 36°18′30″N 96°57′5″W | Noble | |
| Old Santa Fe Railroad Bridge | Old Santa Fe Railroad Bridge | 1902 | 2010-3-10 | Wanette | Pottawatomie | |
| Opossum Creek Bridge | | 1913 | 2009-3-4 | South Coffeyville vicinity 36°57′24.37″N 95°38′33.61″W | Nowata | |
| Pryor Creek Bridge | Pryor Creek Bridge | 1926, 1932 | 2006-09-06 | Chelsea; 36°32′18″N 95°24′54″W | Rogers | Modified Pratt Through Truss |
| Rock Creek Bridge | | 1937 | 2008-09-04 | Blanco vicinity | Pittsburg | |
| Squirrel Creek Bridge | | 1916–1917 | 2010-9-3 | Shawnee vicinity | Pottawatomie | |
| State Highway 78 Bridge at the Red River | Highway 78 Bridge at Red River, from the West side. | 1937, 1938 | 1996-12-20 | Ravenna; 33°45′29″N 96°11′55″W | Bryan | K-truss through bridge |
| State Highway 79 Bridge at the Red River | | 1939 | 1996-12-20 | Byers; 34°7′58″N 98°5′26″W | Jefferson | camelback pony truss |
| US Highway 77 Bridge at Canadian River | US Highway 77 Bridge at Canadian River | 1938 | 2003-09-02 | Purcell; 35°0′54″N 97°20′38″W | McClain | Deck Truss Bridge |
