= Oklahoma State Highway 131 =

State highway in Oklahoma, United States

State Highway 131
- SH-131 highlighted in red

Route information
- Maintained by ODOT
- Length: 13.63 mi (21.94 km)
- Existed: 1958–present

Major junctions
- West end: SH-31 near Coalgate
- East end: US 69 south of Kiowa

Location
- Country: United States
- State: Oklahoma

Highway system
- Oklahoma State Highway System; Interstate; US; State; Turnpikes
← SH-130	→ SH-132

State Highway 131 (SH-131 or OK-131) is a 13.63-mile-long (21.94 km) state highway in southeastern Oklahoma. It runs through Coal and Atoka Counties. It has no lettered spur routes.

== Route description ==
SH-131 begins in Coal County 6 miles (9.7 km) northeast of Coalgate, the county seat. From the terminus at State Highway 31, SH-131 heads northeast towards the unincorporated town of Cairo. North of Phillips Hollow, the route crosses a small stream, an eventual tributary of Coal Creek. The highway then crosses the Coal–Atoka county line.

After entering Atoka County, the highway gradually curves onto an east-northeast course, which continues as it passes through Wardville, another incorporated town 8 miles (13 km) northeast of Cairo. SH-131 then becomes a more easterly route. After bridging North Boggy Creek, the route swings around to the north briefly, before returning to a due east heading. The road then crosses Fivemile Creek. Five miles (8.0 km) east of Wardville, it ends at US-69 south of Kiowa.

== History ==
State Highway 131 first appeared on the 1959 state road map. When it was originally commissioned, it began at its present-day western terminus near Cairo, but stopped short of the present-day eastern terminus, instead ending in Wardville. SH-131 had these termini for over twenty years. The route was extended to US-69 in 1985. No further changes to the highway have been made since the extension.

== Junction list ==
County	Location	mi	km	Destinations	Notes
Coal		0.00	0.00	SH-31	Western terminus
Atoka		13.63	21.94	US-69	Eastern terminus
1.000 mi = 1.609 km; 1.000 km = 0.621 mi
