= Wardville =

Wardville may refer to the following places:

- Wardville, Oklahoma
- Wardville, Texas
- Wardville, New Zealand
