= Oklahoma State Highway 26 =

State highway in Oklahoma, United States

State Highway 26

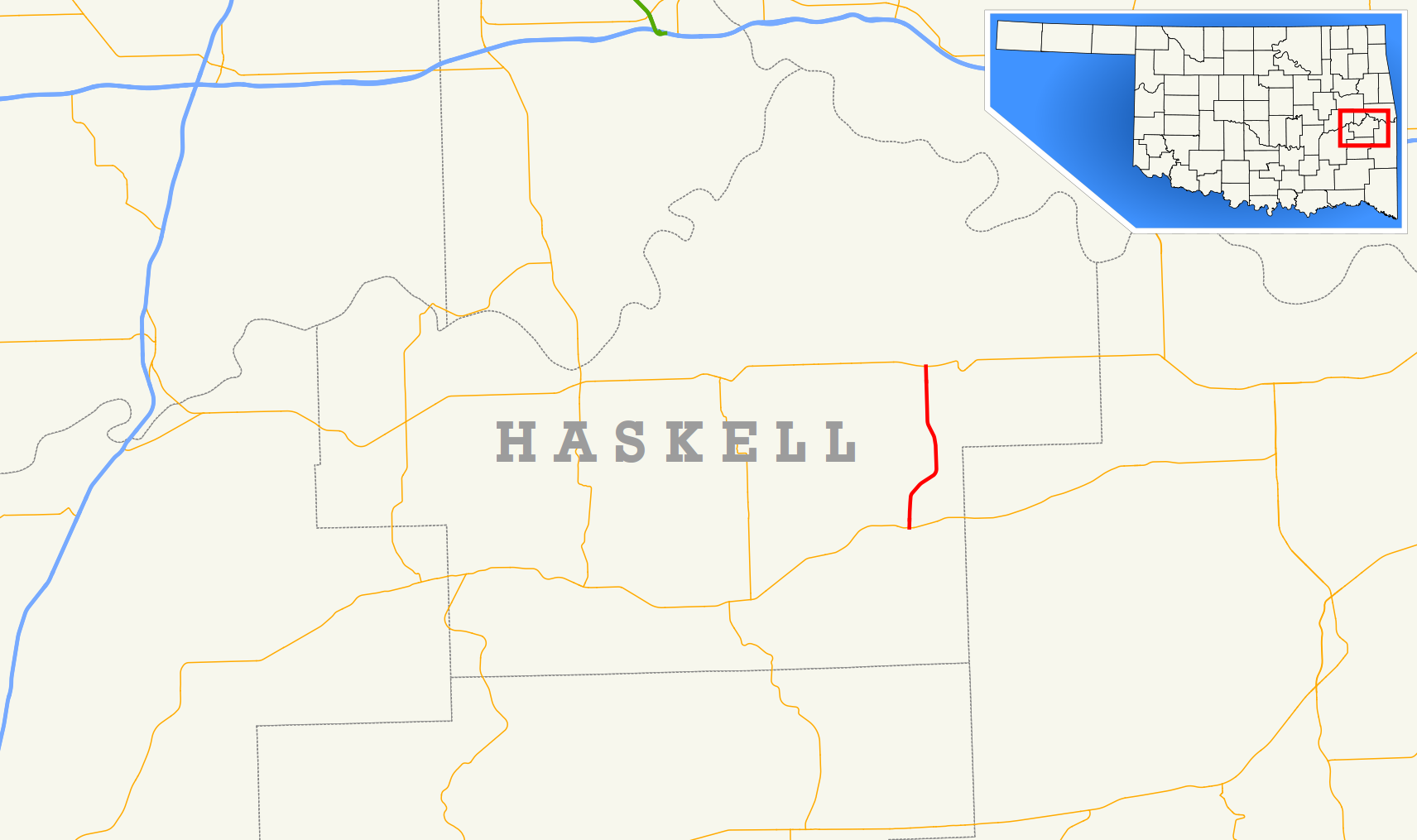

Route information
- Maintained by ODOT
- Length: 7.97 mi (12.83 km)

Major junctions
- South end: SH-31 west of McCurtain
- North end: SH-9 west of Keota

Location
- Country: United States
- State: Oklahoma

Highway system
- Oklahoma State Highway System; Interstate; US; State; Turnpikes
← SH-25	→ SH-27

State Highway 26 (abbreviated SH-26 or OK-26) is a state highway in Oklahoma. It runs for a total of 7.97 miles (12.83 km), south-to-north, in eastern Haskell County. SH-26 serves as a link between SH-31 and SH-9. There are no letter-suffixed spur highways branching from SH-26.

== Route description ==
SH-26 begins at SH-31 on the west side of McCurtain. For its entire length, the highway alternates between passing through forested areas and clearings. It travels eight miles (13 km) in a curving path to the north to the intersection with SH-9, two miles (3.2 km) west of Keota.

== Junction list ==
The entire route is in Haskell County.

Location	mi	km	Destinations	Notes
McCurtain	0.00	0.00	SH-31	Southern terminus
	7.97	12.83	SH-9	Northern terminus
1.000 mi = 1.609 km; 1.000 km = 0.621 mi
