= Phillips, Oklahoma =

Town in Oklahoma, US

- Town
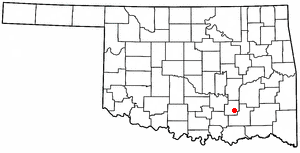
- Location of Phillips, Oklahoma
- Coordinates: 34°30′15″N 96°13′23″W
- Country: United States
- State: Oklahoma
- County: Coal

Area
  - Total: 0.53 sq mi (1.37 km^{2})
  - Land: 0.53 sq mi (1.36 km^{2})
  - Water: 0.0039 sq mi (0.01 km^{2})
- Elevation: 594 ft (181 m)

Population (2020)
  - Total: 122
  - Density: 232.5/sq mi (89.75/km^{2})
- Time zone: UTC-6 (Central (CST))
  - Summer (DST): UTC-5 (CDT)
- ZIP code: 74538
- Area code: 580
- FIPS code: 40-58500
- GNIS feature ID: 2413128

Phillips is a town in Coal County, Oklahoma, United States. As of the 2020 census, Phillips had a population of 122.

== History ==
A post office was established at Phillips, Indian Territory on April 2, 1892. It closed on April 2, 1927. It was named for Henry L. Phillips, a coal mine operator.

At the time of its founding, Phillips was located in Atoka County, a part of the Pushmataha District of the Choctaw Nation.

== Geography ==
Phillips is located in southeastern Coal County. U.S. Route 75 passes through the town, leading north 2.5 miles (4.0 km) to Coalgate, the county seat, and south 2.5 miles (4.0 km) to Lehigh.

According to the United States Census Bureau, the town has a total area of 0.50 square miles (1.3 km^{2}), all land.

== Demographics ==
Historical population
Census	Pop.	Note	%±
1910	680		—
1920	972		42.9%
1930	176		−81.9%
1940	212		20.5%
1950	181		−14.6%
1960	91		−49.7%
1970	106		16.5%
1980	178		67.9%
1990	161		−9.6%
2000	150		−6.8%
2010	135		−10.0%
2020	122		−9.6%
U.S. Decennial Census

=== 2020 census ===
As of the 2020 census, Phillips had a population of 122. The median age was 40.0 years. 27.9% of residents were under the age of 18 and 19.7% of residents were 65 years of age or older. For every 100 females there were 87.7 males, and for every 100 females age 18 and over there were 91.3 males age 18 and over.

0.0% of residents lived in urban areas, while 100.0% lived in rural areas.

There were 42 households in Phillips, of which 21.4% had children under the age of 18 living in them. Of all households, 52.4% were married-couple households, 19.0% were households with a male householder and no spouse or partner present, and 28.6% were households with a female householder and no spouse or partner present. About 30.9% of all households were made up of individuals and 23.8% had someone living alone who was 65 years of age or older.

There were 63 housing units, of which 33.3% were vacant. The homeowner vacancy rate was 7.1% and the rental vacancy rate was 53.8%.

Racial composition as of the 2020 census
Race	Number	Percent
White	65	53.3%
Black or African American	0	0.0%
American Indian and Alaska Native	35	28.7%
Asian	0	0.0%
Native Hawaiian and Other Pacific Islander	0	0.0%
Some other race	1	0.8%
Two or more races	21	17.2%
Hispanic or Latino (of any race)	2	1.6%

=== 2000 census ===
As of the census of 2000, there were 150 people, 58 households, and 41 families residing in the town. The population density was 286.1 inhabitants per square mile (110.5/km^{2}). There were 64 housing units at an average density of 122.1 per square mile (47.1/km^{2}). The racial makeup of the town was 65.33% White, 20.00% Native American, and 14.67% from two or more races. Hispanic or Latino of any race were 0.67% of the population.

There were 58 households, out of which 34.5% had children under the age of 18 living with them, 50.0% were married couples living together, 17.2% had a female householder with no husband present, and 27.6% were non-families. 24.1% of all households were made up of individuals, and 10.3% had someone living alone who was 65 years of age or older. The average household size was 2.59 and the average family size was 3.05.

In the town, the population was spread out, with 28.0% under the age of 18, 8.7% from 18 to 24, 30.7% from 25 to 44, 22.7% from 45 to 64, and 10.0% who were 65 years of age or older. The median age was 34 years. For every 100 females, there were 111.3 males. For every 100 females age 18 and over, there were 100.0 males.

The median income for a household in the town was $33,750, and the median income for a family was $36,667. Males had a median income of $47,500 versus $23,750 for females. The per capita income for the town was $13,439. There were 27.1% of families and 21.9% of the population living below the poverty line, including 15.6% of under eighteens and 12.5% of those over 64.
