= Oklahoma State Highway 31 =

State highway in Oklahoma, United States

State Highway 31

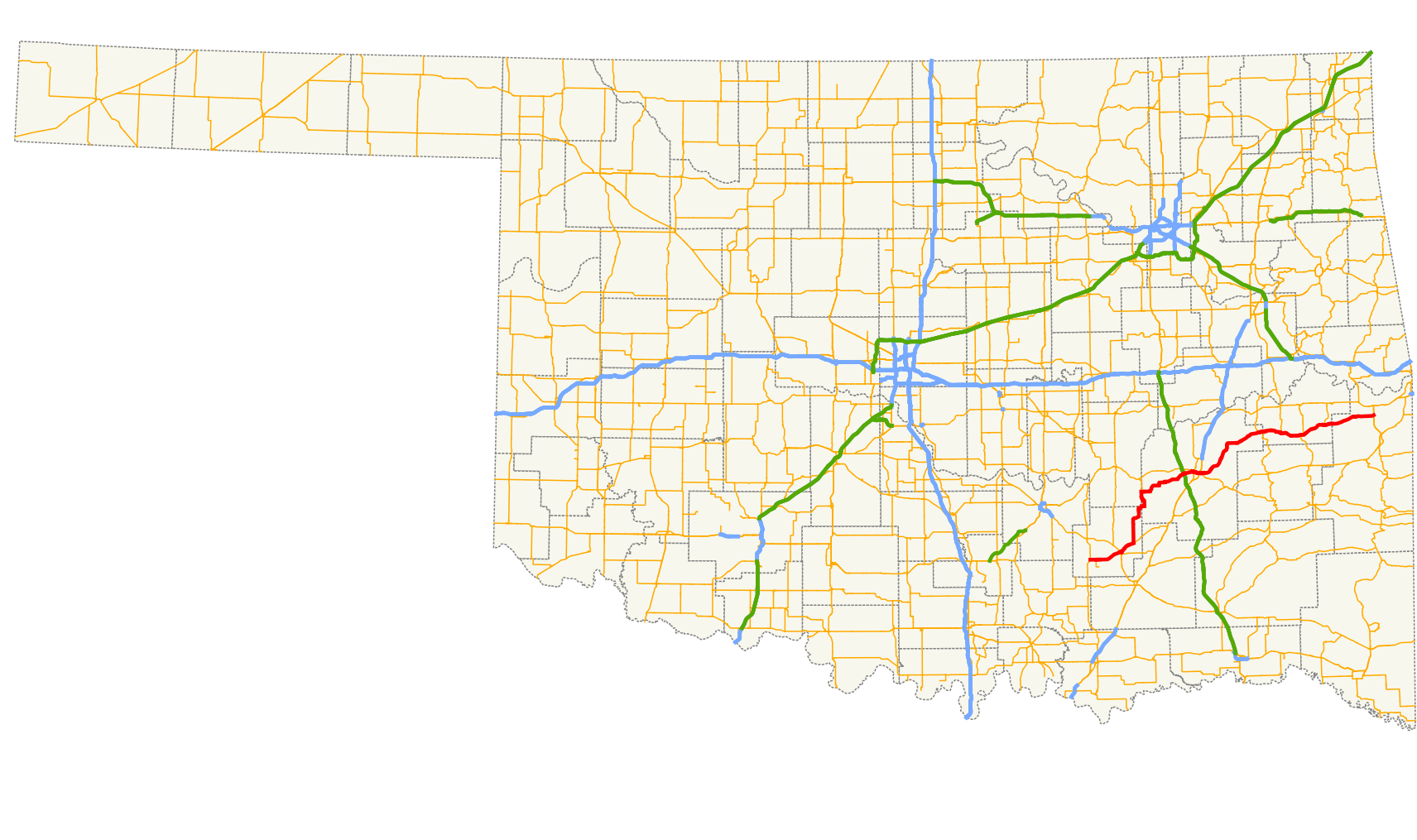

Route information
- Maintained by ODOT
- Length: 132.6 mi (213.4 km)

Major junctions
- West end: SH-48 south of Tupelo
- US 75 / SH-3 in Coalgate; US 69 / US 270 / SH-1 in McAlester
- East end: US 59 / US 271 north of Panama

Location
- Country: United States
- State: Oklahoma

Highway system
- Oklahoma State Highway System; Interstate; US; State; Turnpikes
| ← SH-30 | → SH-32 |

State Highway 31 (abbreviated SH-31) is a state highway in Oklahoma. The road runs 132.6 miles. in an irregular west-to-east pattern in the southeastern part of the state.

There are two spur highways branching from SH-31, SH-31A and SH-31B.

== Route description ==
SH-31 begins at SH-48 seven miles (11 km) south of Tupelo. Two miles (3.2 km) east of here, SH-31B branches off, connecting the main highway with the town of Olney. SH-31 then continues for 10 miles (16 km) to Coalgate, the seat of Coal County, where it intersects US-75/SH-3. Leaving Coalgate, SH-31 turns north at SH-131, traveling 22 miles (35 km) to its junction with SH-31A, which connects with US-270 at Stuart. At SH-31A, SH-31 turns to the east, following the northern edge of the McAlester Army Ammunition Plant, arriving in McAlester, seat of Pittsburg County, 22 miles (35 km) later.

In McAlester, SH-31 forms a five-mile (8 km) concurrency with US-270 and SH-1, splitting up just east of the US-69 interchange on the east side of the city. SH-31 then sets off to the northeast, passing through Krebs, and crossing the south arm of Lake Eufaula.

At Quinton, 27 miles (43 km) from McAlester, SH-31 serves as the southern terminus of SH-71, then heads east, forming a six-mile (10 km) concurrency with SH-2 to the town of Kinta. At Kinta, SH-2 turns north, and SH-31 continues east, with a short dogleg concurrency with SH-82 at Lequire. Continuing on to the east, SH-31 serves as the southern terminus for SH-26 at McCurtain, then passes through Bokoshe before terminating at US-59/US-271, two miles (3.2 km) north of Panama.

== Junction list ==
| County | Location | mi | km | Destinations | Notes |
|---|---|---|---|---|---|
| Coal | | 0.0 | 0.0 | SH-48 | Western terminus |
| Coal | | 2.0 | 3.2 | SH-31B | Northern terminus of SH-31B |
| Coal | Coalgate | 11.5 | 18.5 | US 75 / SH-3 | Western end of US-75/SH-3 concurrency |
| Coal | Coalgate | 11.6 | 18.7 | US 75 / SH-3 | Eastern end of US-75/SH-3 concurrency |
| Coal | Cairo | 17.1 | 27.5 | SH-131 | Western terminus of SH-131 |
| Pittsburg | No major junctions | | | | |
| Hughes | | 39.0 | 62.8 | SH-31A | Southern terminus of SH-31A |
| Pittsburg | McAlester | 60.9 | 98.0 | US 270 / SH-1 | Western end of US-270/OK-1 concurrency |
| Pittsburg | McAlester | 62.7 | 100.9 | US 69 | |
| Pittsburg | McAlester | 63.4 | 102.0 | US 270 / SH-1 | Eastern end of US-270/OK-1 concurrency |
| Pittsburg | Quinton | 90.8 | 146.1 | SH-71 | Southern terminus of SH-71 |
| Haskell | | 92.9 | 149.5 | SH-2 | Western end of SH-2 concurrency |
| Haskell | Kinta | 98.6 | 158.7 | SH-2 | Eastern end of SH-2 concurrency |
| Haskell | Lequire | 106.4 | 171.2 | SH-82 | |
| Haskell | McCurtain | 115.1 | 185.2 | SH-26 | Southern terminus of SH-26 |
| Le Flore | | 132.6 | 213.4 | US 59 / US 271 | Eastern terminus |
1.000 mi = 1.609 km; 1.000 km = 0.621 mi: Concurrency terminus

== Spur routes ==
=== SH-31A ===
State Highway 31A
- Location: Pittsburg and Hughes counties
- Length: 4.46 mi (7.18 km)

SH-31A is a 4.46-mile (7.18 km) spur connecting SH-31 with US-270/SH-1 and the town of Stuart in Pittsburg and Hughes counties.

=== SH-31B ===
State Highway 31B
- Location: Olney
- Length: 3.44 mi (5.54 km)

SH-31B is a 3.44-mile (5.54 km) spur connecting SH-31 and the town of Olney in Coal County.
