= Ottawa County Courthouse =

Ottawa County Courthouse may refer to:

- Ottawa County Courthouse (Ohio), listed on the NRHP in Ohio
- Ottawa County Courthouse (Oklahoma), listed on the NRHP in Oklahoma
