= Clarita, Oklahoma =

Unincorporated community in Oklahoma, US

- Unincorporated community
- Location within the state of Oklahoma Clarita (the United States)
- Coordinates: 34°28′57″N 96°26′12″W
- Country: United States
- State: Oklahoma
- County: Coal

Area
  - Total: 7.91 sq mi (20.48 km^{2})
  - Land: 7.90 sq mi (20.47 km^{2})
  - Water: 0.0039 sq mi (0.01 km^{2})
- Elevation: 692 ft (211 m)

Population (2020)
  - Total: 135
  - Density: 17/sq mi (6.6/km^{2})
- Time zone: UTC-6 (Central (CST))
  - Summer (DST): UTC-5 (CDT)
- FIPS code: 40-14750
- GNIS feature ID: 2629912

Clarita is a small unincorporated community in Coal County, Oklahoma, United States. Originally called Kittie, the name was changed to Clarita with the establishment of the post office on January 19, 1910. The name came from Clarita Kenefic, the wife of railroad official William Kenefic.

As of the 2020 census, Clarita had a population of 135.

Clarita's school district, Olney Public School District, is one of the smallest public school districts in the state of Oklahoma. For the most recent data available, for a combined district, K-12, Olney finished between Boley (51) and Sweetwater (60), with 58 students. Olney School is now closed although the reunion is still held at the lunch room.

The Census Bureau defined a census-designated place (CDP) for Clarita in 2015.

== Demographics ==
Historical population
Census	Pop.	Note	%±
2020	135		—
U.S. Decennial Census

=== 2020 census ===
As of the 2020 census, Clarita had a population of 135. The median age was 47.8 years. 14.8% of residents were under the age of 18 and 11.1% of residents were 65 years of age or older. For every 100 females there were 104.5 males, and for every 100 females age 18 and over there were 85.5 males age 18 and over.

All residents lived in rural areas.

There were 63 households in Clarita, of which 17.5% had children under the age of 18 living in them. Of all households, 66.7% were married-couple households, 19.0% were households with a male householder and no spouse or partner present, and 12.7% were households with a female householder and no spouse or partner present. About 23.8% of all households were made up of individuals and 11.1% had someone living alone who was 65 years of age or older.

There were 72 housing units, of which 12.5% were vacant. The homeowner vacancy rate was 4.5% and the rental vacancy rate was 100.0%.

Racial composition as of the 2020 census
Race	Number	Percent
White	111	82.2%
Black or African American	0	0.0%
American Indian and Alaska Native	13	9.6%
Asian	0	0.0%
Native Hawaiian and Other Pacific Islander	0	0.0%
Some other race	0	0.0%
Two or more races	11	8.1%
Hispanic or Latino (of any race)	6	4.4%
