= Lequire, Oklahoma =

- Census-designated place
- Location within Oklahoma Location within the United States
- Coordinates: 35°06′35″N 95°06′24″W
- Country: United States
- State: Oklahoma
- County: Haskell

Area
  - Total: 3.15 sq mi (8.17 km^{2})
  - Land: 3.15 sq mi (8.15 km^{2})
  - Water: 0.0077 sq mi (0.02 km^{2})
- Elevation: 548 ft (167 m)

Population (2020)
  - Total: 127
  - Density: 40.4/sq mi (15.59/km^{2})
- Time zone: UTC-6 (Central (CST))
  - Summer (DST): UTC-5 (CDT)
- ZIP code: 74943
- Area codes: 539/918
- GNIS feature ID: 2629928

Lequire is an unincorporated community and census-designated place (CDP) in Haskell County, Oklahoma, United States. Lequire is located at the junction of state highways 31 and 82, 10.5 miles (16.9 km) south of Stigler. As of the 2020 census, Lequire had a population of 127.

A post office was established at Lequire, Indian Territory on December 12, 1906. It was named for P.H. Lequire, a local sawmill operator. The post office uses ZIP code 74943.

At the time of its founding, Lequire was located in the Moshulatubbee District of the Choctaw Nation.

== Demographics ==
Historical population
Census	Pop.	Note	%±
2020	127		—
U.S. Decennial Census

=== 2020 census ===
As of the 2020 census, Lequire had a population of 127. The median age was 36.8 years. 25.2% of residents were under the age of 18 and 19.7% of residents were 65 years of age or older. For every 100 females there were 126.8 males, and for every 100 females age 18 and over there were 126.2 males age 18 and over.

0.0% of residents lived in urban areas, while 100.0% lived in rural areas.

There were 42 households in Lequire, of which 26.2% had children under the age of 18 living in them. Of all households, 73.8% were married-couple households, 4.8% were households with a male householder and no spouse or partner present, and 19.0% were households with a female householder and no spouse or partner present. About 16.7% of all households were made up of individuals and 7.1% had someone living alone who was 65 years of age or older.

There were 57 housing units, of which 26.3% were vacant. The homeowner vacancy rate was 0.0% and the rental vacancy rate was 66.7%.

Racial composition as of the 2020 census
Race	Number	Percent
White	98	77.2%
Black or African American	1	0.8%
American Indian and Alaska Native	13	10.2%
Asian	0	0.0%
Native Hawaiian and Other Pacific Islander	0	0.0%
Some other race	4	3.1%
Two or more races	11	8.7%
Hispanic or Latino (of any race)	10	7.9%

=== 2021–2022 estimates ===
As of 2022, there are 131 people living in Lequire, Oklahoma, 95.4% of them are citizens. Six persons, or 4.58% of the population of Lequire, Oklahoma, were foreign-born as of 2022. Lequire, Oklahoma had 108 White residents in 2022, 10.8 times more than any other race or ethnicity. The second and third most prevalent ethnic groups, 12+ and six residents, respectively.

The average number of people per household in the area is 2.29. The population is estimated to be 56.6% male and 43.4% female. The overall median age is 37.6 years. When broken down by gender, the median age for males is 41.5 years, while for females, it is 45.8 years.

In 2022, 95.4% of Lequire, Oklahoma residents were US citizens, which is higher than the national average of 93.5%. In the previous year, 2021, the percentage of US citizens in Lequire, Oklahoma was 96.2%, meaning that the citizenship rate has been decreasing.

== Economy ==
Lequire, Oklahoma has 60 workers in its economy. Professional, Scientific, & Technical Services (12 employees), Accommodation & Food Services (10 employees), and Mining, Quarrying, & Oil & Gas Extraction (9 employees) are the three largest industries in Lequire, Oklahoma. The highest paying industries are Total ($26,667), Professional, Scientific, & Management, & Administrative & Waste Management Services ($24,167), and Agriculture, Forestry, Fishing & Hunting, & Mining ($61,000).

Employment in Lequire, Oklahoma increased from 56 to 60 workers in 2022 at a rate of 7.14%. In Lequire, Oklahoma, the most prevalent industries for employment are Mining, Quarrying, & Oil & Gas Extraction (9 people), Accommodation & Food Services (10 people), and Professional, Scientific, & Technical Services (12 people).

Oklahoma has a minimum wage score of 9.65 for all states, with an average living wage of $30.58 per hour and a minimum wage of $7.25 per hour for farm workers, which can be set higher than the state average. The minimum wage for tipped employees is $2.13/hr, which gives Oklahoma a minimum wage for tipped employees score of 8.97 compared to all other states.

== Near Location ==
Kinta, McCurtain, Stigler, Red Oak, Whitefield, Panola, Keota, Quinton, Hoyt, Fanshawe, Enterprise, Wilburton, Leflore, Bokoshe, Porum, Cowlington, Wister, Shady Point, Talihina, Panama, Gowen, Blocker, Carlton Landing, Poteau, Higgins, Webbers Falls, Vian, Texanna, Howe, Warner, Spiro, Sallisaw, Gore, Eufaula, Gans, Albion, Canadian, Whitesboro, Hartshorne, Heavener, Haileyville, Carlton Lndg, Eutaula, Lake Eufaula, Cameron, Crowder, Hodgen, Fort Coffee.
