= Benjamin Franklin Smallwood =

Choctaw Nation leader (1829–1891)

Choctaw Nation leader
- Preceded by: Thompson McKinney
- Succeeded by: Wilson Nathaniel Jones

Personal details
- Born: c. 1829 Mississippi
- Died: December 15, 1891 Lehigh, Indian Territory
- Party: National Party
- Spouse(s): Siney LeFlore, Annie Burney; Abbie James
- Children: Daniel, Lorinda, MaryJane, Amelia, Elmira
- Parent(s): William Smallwood; Mary (LeFlore) Smallwood
- Education: attended Spencer Academy
- Known for: Principal Chief of Choctaw Nation from 1888 to 1890

Benjamin Franklin Smallwood (c. 1829 – December 15, 1891) was Principal Chief of the Choctaw Republic from 1888 to 1890. From 1847 to 1890, Smallwood held public office in Choctaw Nation, except for the time he served as an officer in the Civil War.

== Early life ==
He was born in about 1829 in Choctaw Nation territory within Mississippi to William and Mary (LeFore) Smallwood in Choctaw Nation in Mississippi. When he was a young child, his family moved to Indian Territory on the Choctaw Trail of Tears. As a child, Smallwood attended Spencer Academy in Choctaw Nation.

== Political career ==
Smallwood began his political career in 1847, when he served as a ranger in Kiamichi County. Also beginning in 1847, he held the office of representative to the Choctaw Council. In his subsequent career, he served as speaker of the lower house and delegate to Washington, D.C. As delegate to Washington, he was responsible for negotiating agreements between the Choctaw and the United States government.

He ran for Principal Chief in 1886 as candidate for the National Party but was defeated by Progressive Party candidate Thompson McKinney. In 1888, he was again the National Party's candidate for Principal Chief, this time running against Progressive candidate Wilson Nathaniel Jones. Because of his long career in the house of representatives, he was popular enough to win the election even though the Progressive Party won the majority of seats in both houses of the Choctaw Council. Because the chief and the council represented different parties, Smallwood was able to accomplish little politically during his years in office.

Politically, Smallwood was very concerned about maintaining the independence of Choctaw Nation and resisting interference from the U.S. Government. He was troubled by the establishment of a federal court in Indian Territory and a law authorizing appeals to the United States authority on matters of Choctaw citizenship after a Choctaw court decision had already been made. He also refused to allow the incorporation of towns established by whites who had moved into Choctaw nation. These towns, which included Krebs and Lehigh lacked official status and public services, including water and sewer systems and fire and police protections.

Important political meetings of Choctaw legislators, religious leaders, and members of the United States Congress were held at Smallwood's home on his ranch near Lehigh, the Benjamin Franklin Smallwood House. This was because Smallwood would not meet with representatives of the U.S. government unless they came to his house.

In 1888, the U.S. Government made a payment to Choctaw Nation, and Smallwood called a special session of the council, which authorized that the funds were to be dispersed without an audit by the Net Proceeds Commission. The payment was for the Leased District, which was originally owned by the Choctaw but had been granted to the United States by treaty in 1855. Smallwood himself pocketed $5,500 of the funds. According to Meserve in the Chronicles of Oklahoma, this "constitutes one of the dark pages in Choctaw history."

He ran for reelection in 1890 but was defeated by Wilson Nathaniel Jones.

During his time in office, Smallwood had advocated for the expansion of Choctaw schools, but due to the divisive political situation, he made little progress. Jones and the new council nonetheless followed his recommendations and added more schools, though Smallwood received no credit.

== Civil War Service ==
During the United States Civil War, Smallwood was Captain of the 2nd Choctaw Regiment in the Confederate Army.

== Business and ranching ==
Smallwood first opened a store in Kiamichi County in 1862. The next year, he moved to Lehigh. Smallwood owned a farm near Lehigh, raised cattle, and ran a dry goods store in town. The sandstone house on his ranch, constructed in 1875, is known as the Benjamin Franklin Smallwood House. It was listed on the National Register of Historic Places in 1982.

== Retirement ==
After being defeated for reelection, Smallwood retired to his home near Lehigh, where he died on December 15, 1891.

== Personal life ==
Smallwood first married Siney LeFlore of the Okla Falaya clan. After passing in 1849, Smallwood married Annie Burney, a Chickasaw from the house of Ima-te-po of the family of Okla-pa-nubbii. Annie died during the Civil War. Smallwood later married Abbie James.

He was Catholic. He is listed as one of the original parishioners at St. Patricks Catholic church in Atoka, Oklahoma. The first Catholic church in what was then pre-statehood Oklahoma.
