= Keel Creek Bridge =

- U.S. National Register of Historic Places
- Location within Oklahoma Location within the United States
- Nearest city: Coalgate, Oklahoma
- Coordinates: 34°36′34″N 96°8′42″W
- Area: less than one acre
- Built: 1940
- Built by: Works Progress Administration
- Architectural style: concrete slab bridge
- NRHP reference No.: 07000257
- Added to NRHP: April 4, 2007

The Keel Creek Bridge is a bridge on Oklahoma State Highway 31 seven miles northeast of Coalgate, Oklahoma. The bridge is listed on the National Register of Historic Places. It was constructed as a Works Progress Administration project. The bridge is significant because of its importance to the transportation history of the area and because it is a WPA-built structure.

== History ==
Prior to the Great Depression, the economy of Coal County, Oklahoma was already very poor; the county's main product, coal, was no longer in demand by railroads, which had switched to oil-powered trains, and boll weevils had decimated the county's cotton farms. The railroads abandoned the lines to Coal County since coal was no longer needed. The Great Depression further weakened the county economy. A variety of New Deal projects were completed in Coal County, which provided needed employment and improved the quality of life. Coal County had historically had very poor roads, and the end of railroad transport in Coal County meant that roads were an essential means of transportation. Coal County thus prioritized infrastructure improvements, ranging from road resurfacing to bridge construction. Between 10 and 15 bridges were built in Coal County, including the Keel Creek Bridge. The Keel Creek Bridge was completed in 1940 as a Farm-to-market road project. In 2007, when it was nominated for the National Register of Historic Places, it was still in use, even though many of the WPA bridges in Coal County had been replaced.

== Architecture ==
The bridge is a concrete slab bridge with a sandstone foundation. Stone was chosen because it would require the greatest number of workers. The poured concrete slab deck was chosen because it met Oklahoma highway department of transportation standards for strength and width. The bridge has three spans with two piers and, the bridge deck is around 18 feet above Keel Creek. The masonry shows that those who worked on the bridge were either skilled stonemasons or had perhaps developed their skills working on previous bridge projects. The stones were cut with sharp edges, which gives the bridge a finer appearance than the other Coal County bridges. The bridge has extruded mortar joints, which is a feature no other Coal County WPA structure has.
