= Wardville, Oklahoma =

Unincorporated community in Oklahoma, US

Wardville
- Unincorporated community and Census designated place
- Location within the state of Oklahoma Wardville (the United States)
- Coordinates: 34°39′18″N 96°01′51″W
- Country: United States
- State: Oklahoma
- County: Atoka

Area
  - Total: 1.00 sq mi (2.58 km^{2})
  - Land: 0.98 sq mi (2.54 km^{2})
  - Water: 0.015 sq mi (0.04 km^{2})
- Elevation: 679 ft (207 m)

Population (2020)
  - Total: 53
  - Density: 54.0/sq mi (20.84/km^{2})
- Time zone: UTC-6 (Central (CST))
  - Summer (DST): UTC-5 (CDT)
- ZIP code: 74525
- FIPS code: 40-78350
- GNIS feature ID: 2629940

Wardville is a small unincorporated community in northern Atoka County, Oklahoma, United States, along State Highway 131, 14 miles northeast of Coalgate. As of the 2020 census, Wardville had a population of 53. The post office was established February 6, 1902 under the name Herbert, Indian Territory. Herbert was located in Atoka County, Choctaw Nation, a territorial-era entity which included portions of today's Atoka, Coal, Hughes and Pittsburg counties. The town was named after Herbert Ward, who was the youngest son of the towns first postmaster, Henry Pleasant Ward. The name of the town was changed to Wardville on July 18, 1907. Wardville was named for the before mentioned Henry Pleasant Ward, who served in the territorial House of Representatives and Senate and was an Atoka County judge. The Wardville Post Office closed in 2007.

== Demographics ==
Historical population
Census	Pop.	Note	%±
2020	53		—
U.S. Decennial Census

=== 2020 census ===
As of the 2020 census, Wardville had a population of 53. The median age was 55.2 years. 15.1% of residents were under the age of 18 and 30.2% of residents were 65 years of age or older. For every 100 females there were 130.4 males, and for every 100 females age 18 and over there were 125.0 males age 18 and over.

0.0% of residents lived in urban areas, while 100.0% lived in rural areas.

There were 28 households in Wardville, of which 25.0% had children under the age of 18 living in them. Of all households, 46.4% were married-couple households, 17.9% were households with a male householder and no spouse or partner present, and 21.4% were households with a female householder and no spouse or partner present. About 32.2% of all households were made up of individuals and 17.9% had someone living alone who was 65 years of age or older.

There were 28 housing units, of which 0.0% were vacant. The homeowner vacancy rate was 0.0% and the rental vacancy rate was 0.0%.

=== Racial and ethnic composition ===
Racial composition as of the 2020 census
Race	Number	Percent
White	42	79.2%
Black or African American	0	0.0%
American Indian and Alaska Native	6	11.3%
Asian	0	0.0%
Native Hawaiian and Other Pacific Islander	0	0.0%
Some other race	0	0.0%
Two or more races	5	9.4%
Hispanic or Latino (of any race)	1	1.9%

== Education ==
The CDP is divided between the Kiowa Public Schools school district and the Coalgate Public Schools school district.
