= Aline IOOF Lodge No. 263 =

- U.S. National Register of Historic Places
- Location within Oklahoma Location within the United States
- Location: Off Main and Broadway, Aline, Oklahoma
- Coordinates: 36°30′36″N 98°27′00″W
- Area: less than one acre
- Built: 1930
- MPS: IOOF Buildings in Alfalfa County TR
- NRHP reference No.: 84002941
- Added to NRHP: 8 March 1984

The Aline IOOF Lodge No. 263 was an Odd Fellows building in Aline, Oklahoma, that was built in 1930. It served historically as a clubhouse, as a restaurant, and as a specialty store. It was listed in the National Register of Historic Places in 1984.

It was one of four historic, surviving Odd Fellows buildings in Alfalfa County that were subject of a 1983 study. The others were the Carmen IOOF Lodge No. 84 and the Carmen IOOF Home in Carmen, and the Cherokee IOOF Lodge No. 219 in Cherokee.

It was demolished in 2025.
