= Carmen IOOF Lodge No. 84 =

- U.S. National Register of Historic Places
- Location within Oklahoma Location within the United States
- Location: Main and 4th St., Carmen, Oklahoma
- Coordinates: 36°34′45″N 98°27′30″W
- Area: less than one acre
- Built: 1902
- MPS: IOOF Buildings in Alfalfa County TR
- NRHP reference No.: 84002948
- Added to NRHP: March 8, 1984

The Carmen IOOF Lodge No. 84 is an Odd Fellows building in Carmen, Oklahoma that was built in 1902. It has served historically as a professional building, as a clubhouse, and as a specialty store. It was listed in the National Register of Historic Places in 1984.

It is one of four historic, surviving Odd Fellows buildings in Alfalfa County that were subject of a 1983 study. The others are the Aline IOOF Lodge No. 263 in Aline, the Carmen IOOF Home in Carmen, and the Cherokee IOOF Lodge No. 219 in Cherokee.
