= National Register of Historic Places listings in Oklahoma =

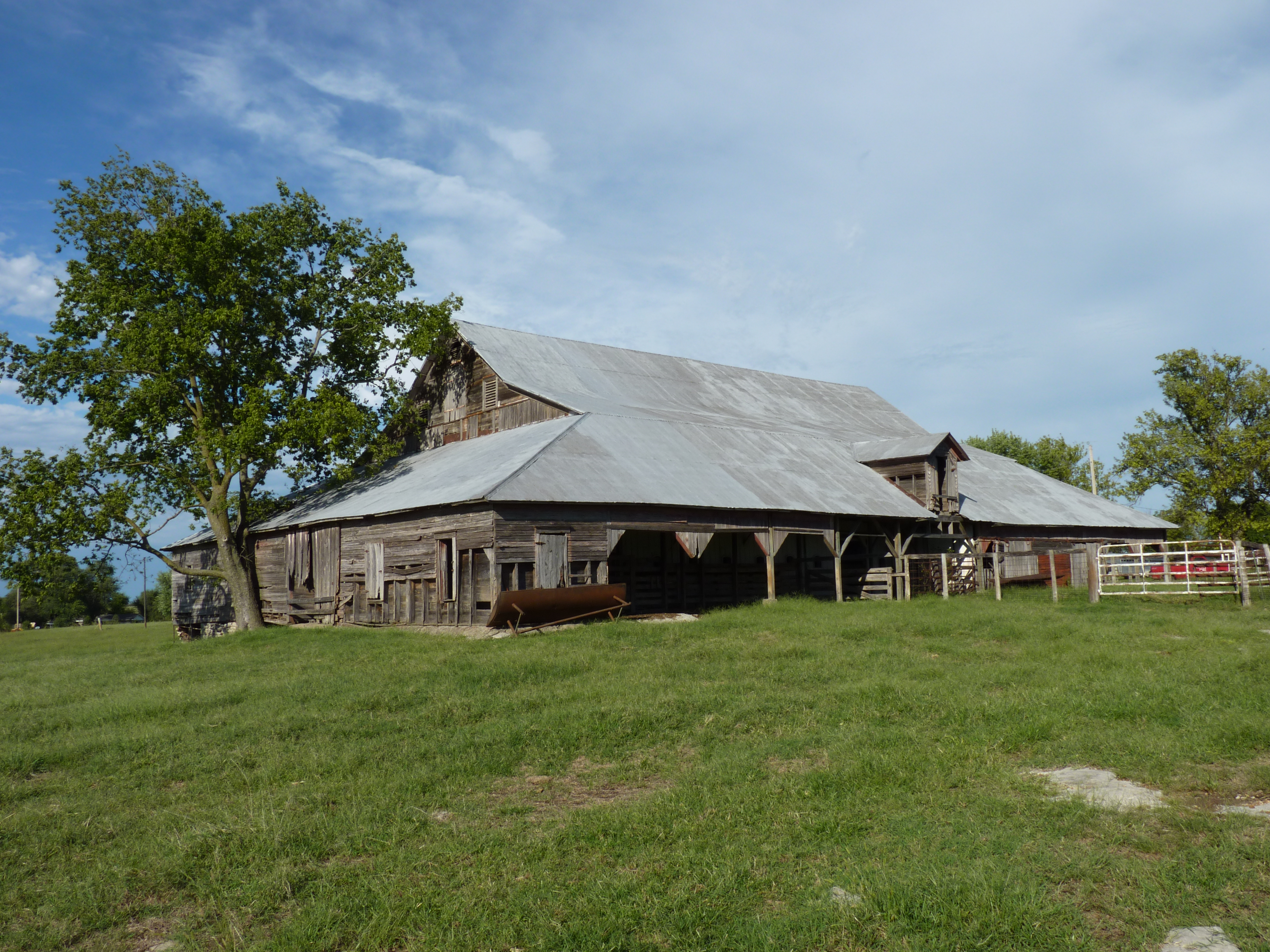
John Patrick McNaughton Barn, Quapaw

This is a list of properties and historic districts in Oklahoma that are designated on the National Register of Historic Places. Listings are distributed across all of Oklahoma's 77 counties.

The following are approximate unofficial tallies of current listings by county. (Note: These counts are based on entries in the National Register Information Database as of March 13, 2009 and new weekly listings posted since then on the National Register of Historic Places web site. There are frequent additions to the listings and occasional delistings. New entries are added to the official Register on a weekly basis. Also, the counts do not take into consideration the modification of sites covered by an existing property or district, although carrying a separate National Register reference number.)

This National Park Service list is complete through NPS recent listings posted October 2, 2026.

== Current listings by county ==
Density of listings per county as of January, 2025

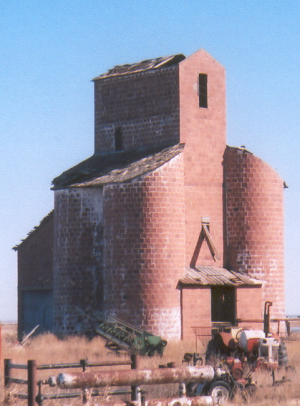
Ingersoll Tile Elevator, in Alfalfa County

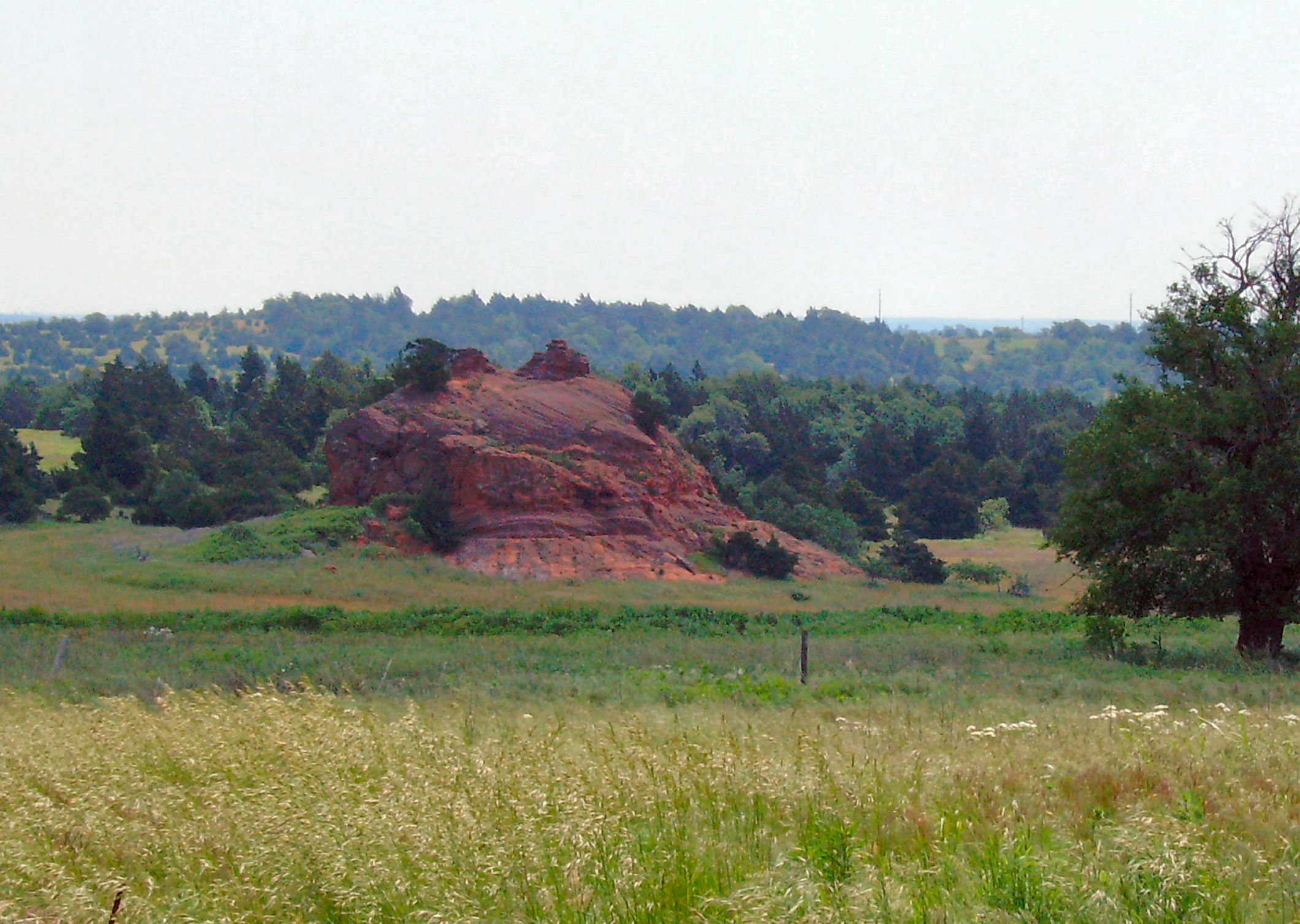
Rock Mary, in Caddo County

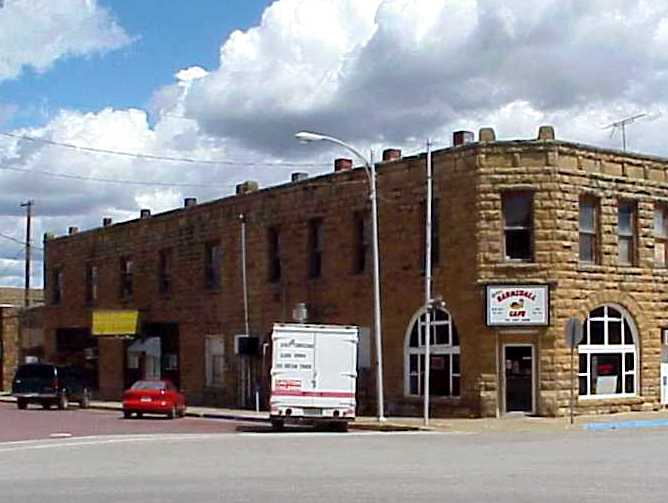
Bank of Bigheart, Barnsdall

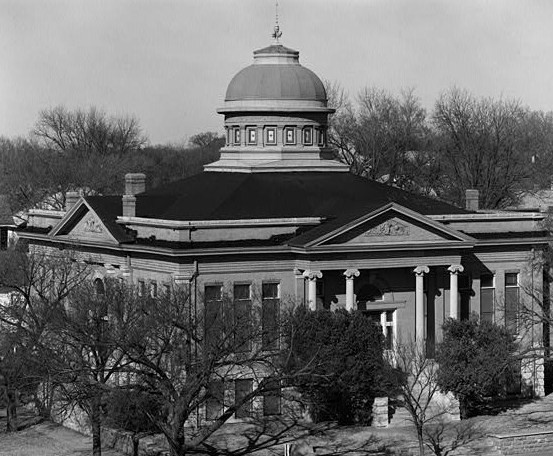
Carnegie Library, Guthrie

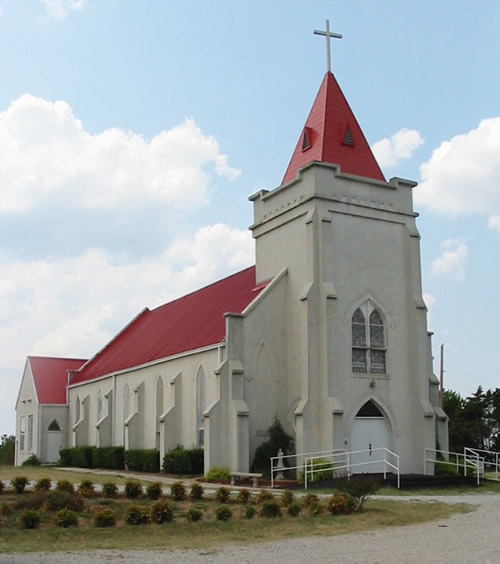
Sacred Heart Mission Site

| | County | # of Sites |
|---|---|---|
| 1 | Adair | 8 |
| 2 | Alfalfa | 12 |
| 3 | Atoka | 17 |
| 4 | Beaver | 11 |
| 5 | Beckham | 15 |
| 6 | Blaine | 18 |
| 7 | Bryan | 16 |
| 8 | Caddo | 14 |
| 9 | Canadian | 25 |
| 10 | Carter | 23 |
| 11 | Cherokee | 21 |
| 12 | Choctaw | 13 |
| 13 | Cimarron | 8 |
| 14 | Cleveland | 26 |
| 15 | Coal | 5 |
| 16 | Comanche | 37 |
| 17 | Cotton | 4 |
| 18 | Craig | 11 |
| 19 | Creek | 31 |
| 20 | Custer | 14 |
| 21 | Delaware | 8 |
| 22 | Dewey | 4 |
| 23 | Ellis | 10 |
| 24 | Garfield | 36 |
| 25 | Garvin | 12 |
| 26 | Grady | 13 |
| 27 | Grant | 6 |
| 28 | Greer | 6 |
| 29 | Harmon | 4 |
| 30 | Harper | 17 |
| 31 | Haskell | 10 |
| 32 | Hughes | 10 |
| 33 | Jackson | 11 |
| 34 | Jefferson | 7 |
| 35 | Johnston | 6 |
| 36 | Kay | 65 |
| 37 | Kingfisher | 10 |
| 38 | Kiowa | 8 |
| 39 | Latimer | 22 |
| 40 | Le Flore | 24 |
| 41 | Lincoln | 46 |
| 42 | Logan | 18 |
| 43 | Love | 6 |
| 44 | McClain | 5 |
| 45 | McCurtain | 16 |
| 46 | McIntosh | 16 |
| 47 | Major | 3 |
| 48 | Marshall | 6 |
| 49 | Mayes | 6 |
| 50 | Murray | 8 |
| 51 | Muskogee | 53 |
| 52 | Noble | 14 |
| 53 | Nowata | 6 |
| 54 | Okfuskee | 5 |
| 55 | Oklahoma | 173 |
| 56 | Okmulgee | 23 |
| 57 | Osage | 23 |
| 58 | Ottawa | 21 |
| 59 | Pawnee | 12 |
| 60 | Payne | 33 |
| 61 | Pittsburg | 30 |
| 62 | Pontotoc | 9 |
| 63 | Pottawatomie | 20 |
| 64 | Pushmataha | 9 |
| 65 | Roger Mills | 7 |
| 66 | Rogers | 18 |
| 67 | Seminole | 20 |
| 68 | Sequoyah | 14 |
| 69 | Stephens | 10 |
| 70 | Texas | 24 |
| 71 | Tillman | 10 |
| 72 | Tulsa | 110 |
| 73 | Wagoner | 21 |
| 74 | Washington | 11 |
| 75 | Washita | 6 |
| 76 | Woods | 18 |
| 77 | Woodward | 5 |
| (less duplicates) | | 6 (Note: Initial Point appears in both Garvin County and Murray County. Lake Wister Locality appears in both Latimer County and Le Flore County. US Highway 77 Bridge at Canadian River appears in both Cleveland County and McClain County. Old Settler's Irrigation Ditch is listed in both Beaver County and Harper County. Bridgeport Hill-Hydro Route 66 Segment appears in both Caddo County and Canadian County. Honey Springs Battlefield is listed in both McIntosh and Muskogee Counties.) |
| TOTAL | | 1,447 |

== See also ==
- List of National Historic Landmarks in Oklahoma
- List of bridges on the National Register of Historic Places in Oklahoma
