= Carmen IOOF Home =

- U.S. National Register of Historic Places
- Location within Oklahoma Location within the United States
- Nearest city: Carmen, Oklahoma
- Coordinates: 36°35′43″N 98°27′43″W
- Area: less than one acre
- Built: 1906
- MPS: IOOF Buildings in Alfalfa County TR
- NRHP reference No.: 84002944
- Added to NRHP: March 8, 1984

The Carmen IOOF Home, also known as or associated with The Carmen Home of Pentecostal Holiness Church, is an Odd Fellows building in Carmen, Oklahoma, built in 1906. It has served historically as institutional housing. It was listed in the National Register of Historic Places in 1984.

It is one of four historic, surviving Odd Fellows buildings in Alfalfa County that were the subject of a 1983 study. The others are the Carmen IOOF Lodge No. 84 in Carmen, the Aline IOOF Lodge No. 263 in Aline, and the Cherokee IOOF Lodge No. 219 in Cherokee.

The Oklahoma Odd Fellows Home at Checotah is another NRHP-listed Odd Fellows retirement home in the state.
