= Coalgate School Gymnasium-Auditorium =

- Coalgate School Gymnasium--Auditorium
- U.S. National Register of Historic Places
- Location within Oklahoma Location within the United States
- Location: Fox and Frey Sts., Coalgate, Oklahoma
- Coordinates: 34°32′1″N 96°13′13″W
- Area: less than one acre
- Built: 1936
- Built by: Works Progress Administration
- MPS: WPA Public Bldgs., Recreational Facilities and Cemetery Improvements in Southeastern Oklahoma, 1935--1943 TR
- NRHP reference No.: 88001382
- Added to NRHP: September 8, 1988

The Coalgate School Gymnasium-Auditorium is a historic school building in Coalgate, Oklahoma. It is located at the intersection of Fox and Frey streets in Coalgate, Oklahoma and is one of several properties in Southeastern Oklahoma constructed by the Works Progress Administration during the Great Depression. It is listed on the National Register of Historic Places.

The gymnasium-auditorium was built by unemployed coal miners who lived in the Coalgate area. The building is significant because it provided needed employment to residents, and the completed building was a center for school and community events. These activities, particularly basketball games, encouraged a feeling of community identity and pride. It is one of three WPA-built structures still standing in Coal County, Oklahoma.

== Architecture ==
The building is a single story rectangular structure built of sandstone from the area. It measures 91 by 59 feet (28 by 18 m). Entrances to the building are surrounded by arches and parapets. It has a gabled roof with shingles that are replacements for the original roofing material.
