= Cherokee IOOF Lodge No. 219 =

- U.S. National Register of Historic Places
- Location within Oklahoma Location within the United States
- Location: Grand Ave. and 2nd St., Cherokee, Oklahoma
- Coordinates: 36°45′23″N 98°21′25″W
- Area: less than one acre
- Built: 1931
- MPS: IOOF Buildings in Alfalfa County TR
- NRHP reference No.: 84002953
- Added to NRHP: March 8, 1984

The Cherokee IOOF Lodge No. 219 is an Odd Fellows building in Cherokee, Oklahoma that was built in 1931. It has served historically as a clubhouse, as a restaurant, as a mortuary, and as a business. It was listed in the National Register of Historic Places in 1984.

It is one of four historic, surviving Odd Fellows buildings in Alfalfa County that were subject of a 1983 study. The others are the Aline IOOF Lodge No. 263 in Aline and the Carmen IOOF Home and Carmen IOOF Lodge No. 84 in Carmen.
