= National Register of Historic Places listings in Kingfisher County, Oklahoma =

Location of Kingfisher County in Oklahoma

This is a list of the National Register of Historic Places listings in Kingfisher County, Oklahoma.

This is intended to be a complete list of the properties on the National Register of Historic Places in Kingfisher County, Oklahoma, United States. The locations of National Register properties for which the latitude and longitude coordinates are included below, may be seen in a map.

There are 10 properties listed on the National Register in the county.

This National Park Service list is complete through NPS recent listings posted March 27, 2026.

== Current listings ==
	Name on the Register	Image	Date listed	Location	City or town	Description
1	Burrus Mills Elevator C		June 2, 2000 (#00000621)	Northeastern corner of the junction of Admire Ave. and 4th St. 35°51′48″N 97°55′41″W	Kingfisher	
2	Dow Grain Company Elevator	Dow Grain Company Elevator	August 31, 2000 (#00001041)	105 E. Oklahoma St. 35°43′33″N 97°58′22″W	Okarche	
3	Farmers and Merchants National Bank		February 23, 1984 (#84003085)	107 S. Main St. 36°06′32″N 97°53′54″W	Hennessey	
4	Farmers Co-op Elevator		August 31, 2000 (#00001042)	121 W. Kansas St. 36°06′39″N 97°54′00″W	Hennessey	
5	Kiel-Dover Farmers Elevator		August 31, 2000 (#00001043)	Junction of E. Chestnut St. and the railroad line 35°58′44″N 97°54′47″W	Dover	Demolished in 2005.
6	Kingfisher Armory	Kingfisher Armory	April 7, 1994 (#94000279)	301 N. 6th St. 35°51′48″N 97°55′50″W	Kingfisher	
7	Kingfisher College Site		October 22, 1976 (#76001566)	1 mile east of Kingfisher; 35°52′04″N 97°54′31″W	Kingfisher	
8	Kingfisher Memorial Hall		June 8, 2006 (#06000487)	123 W. Miles Ave. 35°51′43″N 97°56′01″W	Kingfisher	
9	Kingfisher Post Office	Kingfisher Post Office	January 20, 1978 (#78002239)	406 N. Main St. 35°51′52″N 97°55′59″W	Kingfisher	
10	Seay Mansion	Seay Mansion	March 24, 1971 (#71000664)	11th St. and Zellers Ave. 35°50′56″N 97°56′21″W	Kingfisher	

== See also ==
- List of National Historic Landmarks in Oklahoma
- National Register of Historic Places listings in Oklahoma
