= Centrahoma, Oklahoma =

City in Oklahoma, US

- City
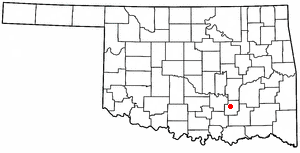
- Location of Centrahoma, Oklahoma
- Coordinates: 34°36′37″N 96°20′37″W
- Country: United States
- State: Oklahoma
- County: Coal

Area
  - Total: 0.25 sq mi (0.65 km^{2})
  - Land: 0.25 sq mi (0.65 km^{2})
  - Water: 0 sq mi (0.00 km^{2})
- Elevation: 705 ft (215 m)

Population (2020)
  - Total: 81
  - Density: 322/sq mi (124.4/km^{2})
- Time zone: UTC-6 (Central (CST))
  - Summer (DST): UTC-5 (CDT)
- ZIP code: 74534
- Area code: 580
- FIPS code: 40-13100
- GNIS feature ID: 2409426

Centrahoma is a rural small city in Coal County, Oklahoma, United States. The population was 81 at the 2020 census.

== History ==
A post office was established at Byrd, Indian Territory on March 3, 1892. It was named for William L. Byrd, Governor of the Chickasaw Nation. Its name changed to Owl, Indian Territory on July 10, 1894. The post office took its name from nearby Owl Creek, a branch of Leader Creek, a tributary of Clear Boggy Creek. On June 11, 1907 the post office was moved a few miles northeast and the name changed to Centrahoma, Indian Territory. Its name was coined from "central Oklahoma." While the name references central Oklahoma, it is nowhere near the center of Oklahoma.

== Geography ==
Centrahoma is located northwest of the center of Coal County. Oklahoma State Highway 3 passes south of the community, leading northwest 24 miles (39 km) to Ada and southeast 22 miles (35 km) to Atoka.

According to the United States Census Bureau, the city has a total area of 0.23 square miles (0.6 km^{2}), all land.

== Demographics ==
Historical population
Census	Pop.	Note	%±
1960	148		—
1970	155		4.7%
1980	166		7.1%
1990	106		−36.1%
2000	110		3.8%
2010	97		−11.8%
2020	81		−16.5%
U.S. Decennial Census

=== 2020 census ===
As of the 2020 census, Centrahoma had a population of 81. The median age was 45.4 years. 25.9% of residents were under the age of 18 and 18.5% of residents were 65 years of age or older. For every 100 females there were 102.5 males, and for every 100 females age 18 and over there were 114.3 males age 18 and over.

All residents lived in rural areas.

There were 37 households in Centrahoma, of which 45.9% had children under the age of 18 living in them. Of all households, 51.4% were married-couple households, 29.7% were households with a male householder and no spouse or partner present, and 16.2% were households with a female householder and no spouse or partner present. About 32.4% of all households were made up of individuals and 8.1% had someone living alone who was 65 years of age or older.

There were 44 housing units, of which 15.9% were vacant. Among occupied housing units, 81.1% were owner-occupied and 18.9% were renter-occupied. The homeowner vacancy rate was 3.2% and the rental vacancy rate was <0.1%.

Racial composition as of the 2020 census
Race	Percent
White	69.1%
Black or African American	<0.1%
American Indian and Alaska Native	9.9%
Asian	<0.1%
Native Hawaiian and Other Pacific Islander	<0.1%
Some other race	<0.1%
Two or more races	21.0%
Hispanic or Latino (of any race)	<0.1%

=== 2000 census ===
As of the 2000 census, there were 110 people, 36 households, and 29 families residing in the city. The population density was 440.4 inhabitants per square mile (170.0/km^{2}). There were 44 housing units at an average density of 176.2 per square mile (68.0/km^{2}). The racial makeup of the city was 71.82% White, 22.73% Native American, and 5.45% from two or more races.

There were 36 households, out of which 44.4% had children under the age of 18 living with them, 61.1% were married couples living together, 16.7% had a female householder with no husband present, and 16.7% were non-families. 13.9% of all households were made up of individuals, and 8.3% had someone living alone who was 65 years of age or older. The average household size was 3.06 and the average family size was 3.30.

In the city, the population was spread out, with 39.1% under the age of 18, 7.3% from 18 to 24, 28.2% from 25 to 44, 13.6% from 45 to 64, and 11.8% who were 65 years of age or older. The median age was 29 years. For every 100 females, there were 107.5 males. For every 100 females age 18 and over, there were 116.1 males.

The median income for a household in the city was $23,125, and the median income for a family was $24,375. Males had a median income of $16,607 versus $18,750 for females. The per capita income for the city was $8,927. There were 17.4% of families and 29.3% of the population living below the poverty line, including 52.2% of under eighteens and 25.0% of those over 64.
