= Cairo, Oklahoma =

Unincorporated community in Oklahoma, US

- Unincorporated community
- Location within the state of Oklahoma Cairo (the United States)
- Coordinates: 35°34′26″N 96°07′55″W
- Country: United States
- State: Oklahoma
- County: Coal
- Elevation: 640 ft (200 m)
- Time zone: UTC-6 (Central (CST))
  - Summer (DST): UTC-5 (CDT)
- GNIS feature ID: 1100257

Cairo is an unincorporated community in Coal County, Oklahoma, United States. It is located seven miles northeast of Coalgate. The community was named after the town of Cairo, Illinois. A post office operated in Cairo from March 28, 1902, to July 15, 1939.
