= Merchants National Bank Building =

Bank building in Lehigh, Oklahoma, US

- U.S. National Register of Historic Places
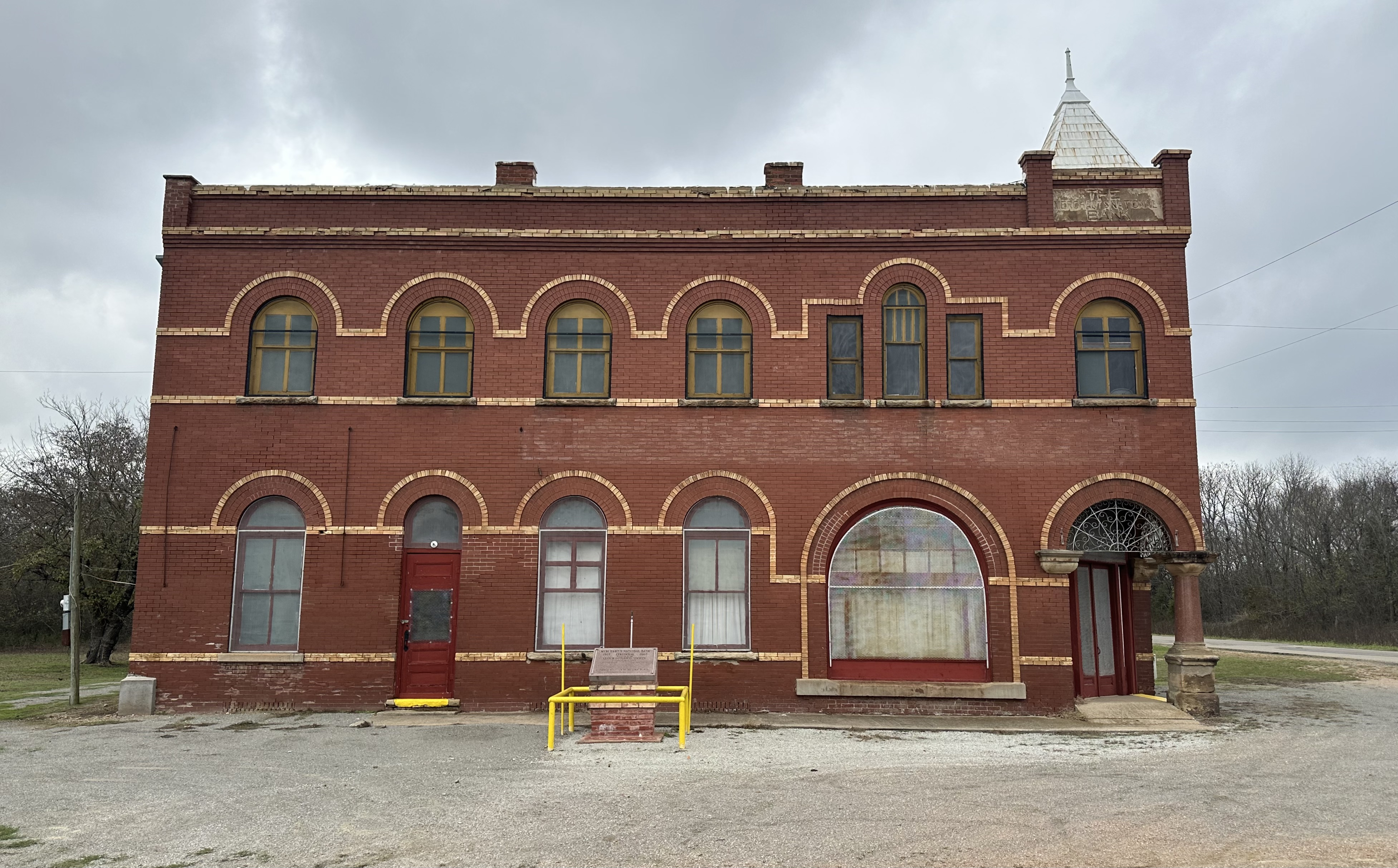
- Merchants National Bank Building in November 2024

- Location within Oklahoma Location within the United States
- Location: SW corner of Main and Railway Sts., Lehigh, Oklahoma
- Coordinates: 34°28′6.3″N 96°13′26.0″W
- Area: less than one acre
- Built: 1907
- Built by: Faudree Brothers
- Architectural style: Late Victorian Renaissance
- NRHP reference No.: 06001112
- Added to NRHP: December 6, 2006

The Merchants National Bank Building is a two-story, red brick building in Lehigh, Oklahoma, United States, located at the southwest corner of Main Street and Railway Street. It was one of two banks that served Lehigh during the town's mining boom. It is listed on the National Register of Historic Places. It is historically significant because it represents the economic growth and decline of Lehigh and exemplifies Late Victorian Renaissance architecture.

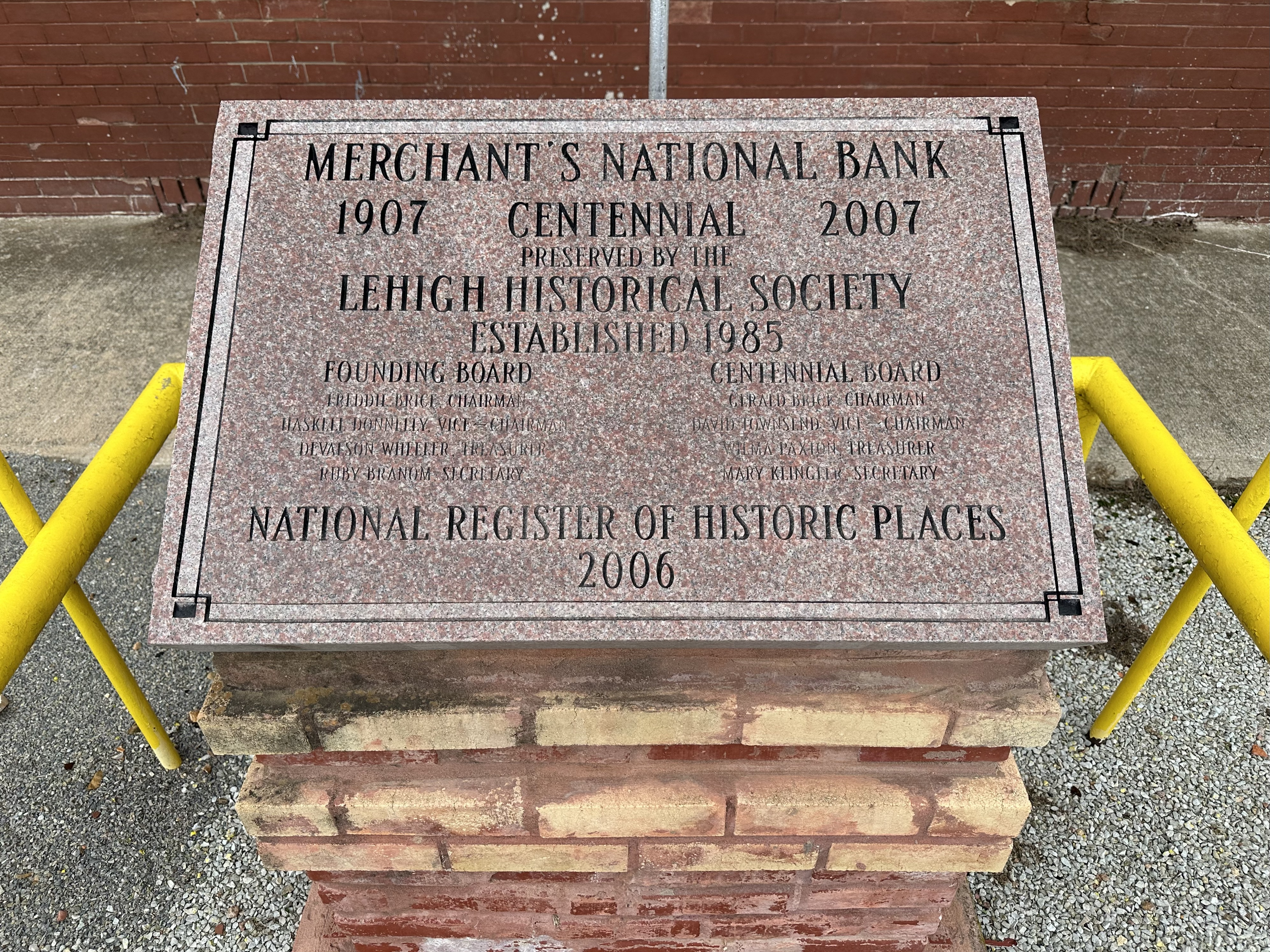
Plaque for the Merchants National Bank Building in Lehigh Oklahoma

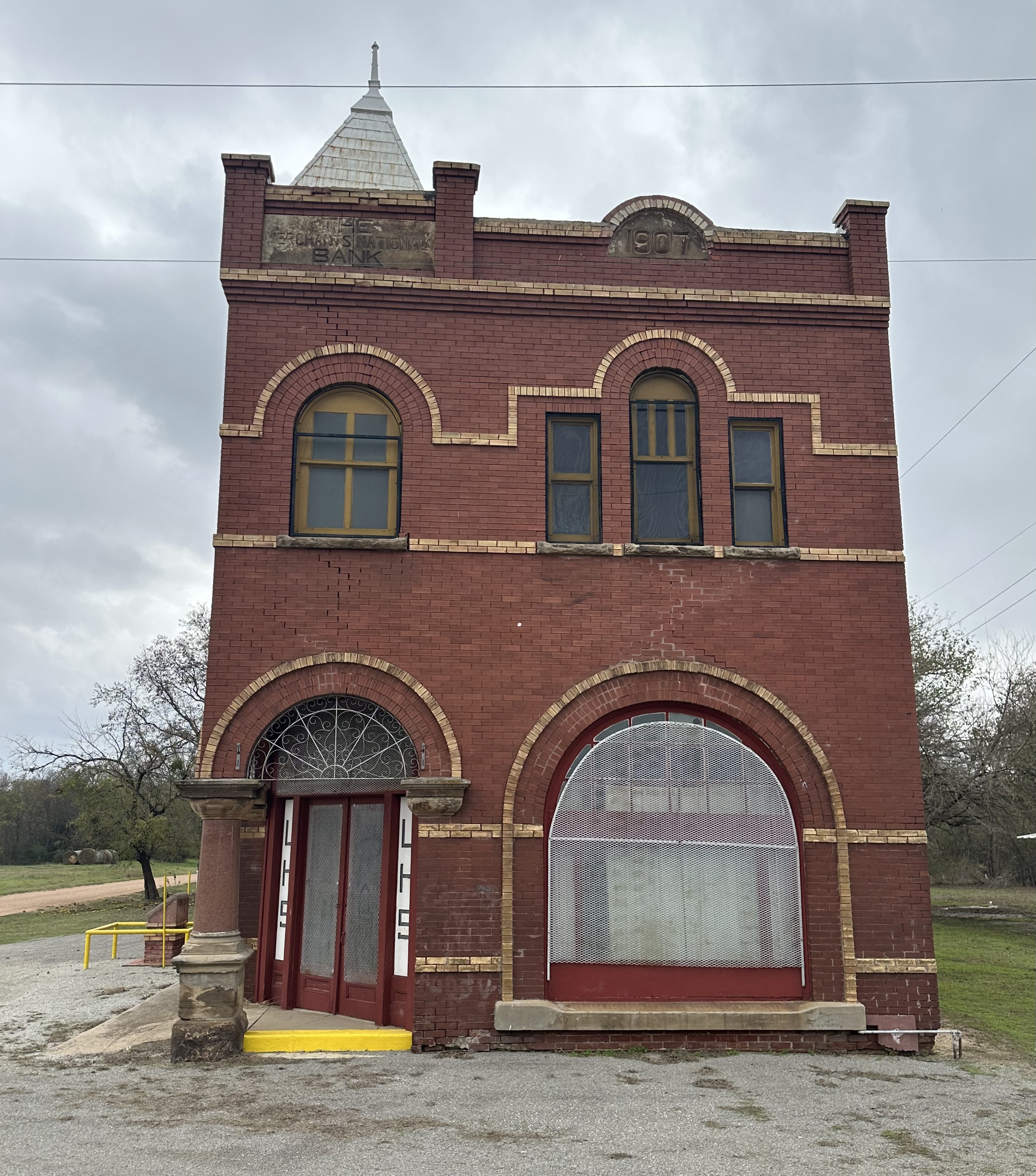
Merchants National Bank Building in Lehigh Oklahoma

== History ==
During the late-19th and early-20th centuries, Lehigh was a prosperous community due to the high demand for coal from mines in Coal County. The Merchants National Bank was founded in 1906. It was the second bank in Lehigh; the Lehigh National Bank, founded in 1898, was the first. Merchants National Bank operated out of a temporary headquarters for the first several months of its operation. On January 29, 1907, it was announced that the constructing contract for the bank's building had been awarded to Faudree Brothers of Atoka, Oklahoma. The new bank was built on the southwest corner of Katy Avenue and Main Street, and it was, architecturally, one of the most striking buildings in town.

At the time it was built, the bank was located in Atoka County, a part of the Pushmataha District of the Choctaw Nation.

The coal boom ended in the 1910s, as railroads switched to cheaper fuel oil to power their trains. In the early 1920s, the railroads closed their mines in Lehigh. Declining crop prices and damage to the cotton crop from boll weevils further weakened the economy. The Merchants National Bank closed in 1923. The building subsequently housed a grocery store. Many of the other buildings on main street were abandoned. As part of New Deal projects during the Great Depression, most of the abandoned buildings on Main Street were torn down. During World War II, there was again a demand for coal in the area, and many of the town's buildings were torn down or moved so the ground underneath them could be readily mined.

By the 1980s, the grocery store in the Merchants National Bank Building had closed, and the building had deteriorated and been damaged by vandals. In the 1980s, the Lehigh Historical Society completed restoration work on the building. They replaced most of the windows and repaired the roof, ceilings, and floors. The building is the only remaining commercial building in what was once downtown Lehigh. It was added to the National Register of Historic Places in 2006.

== Architecture ==
The building is two stories high and made of red brick with cream brick highlights. It measured 34 by 70 feet, with the short side facing Main Street and the long side facing Railroad Street. It is in the Late Victorian Renaissance style. At the northwest corner, there is a pyramidal tower with a steeply pitched roof and a short, rounded spire. Along the roof of the building, there is a brick parapet on the north and east sides with a sandstone capstone and eight pilasters. The west side of the building has no windows and an unadorned parapet because the west wall was a party wall for the adjacent building. The building has arched windows framed in buff bricks. It has a recessed corner entrance, which is supported by a red granite column on a sandstone pier. The entryway is arch-shaped, and the arch is filled in with decorated wrought iron in a fan-shaped design. The first floor of the building contains the original banking room, which has a pressed tin ceiling, stained oak door and window surrounds, and keystones above the window arches. It has a poured concrete floor, which replaced the original floor, which had been damaged by rot. The plaster walls have been covered by fiberboard.
