= Benjamin Franklin Smallwood House =

Historic house in Oklahoma, United States

- U.S. National Register of Historic Places
- Location within Oklahoma Location within the United States
- Nearest city: Lehigh, Oklahoma
- Coordinates: 34°27′44″N 96°16′33″W
- Area: less than one acre
- Built: 1875
- Built by: Benjamin Smallwood
- NRHP reference No.: 82003676
- Added to NRHP: March 10, 1982

The Benjamin Franklin Smallwood House is a stone house located near Lehigh, Oklahoma. It was the home of Choctaw leader Benjamin Franklin Smallwood. The house is on the National Register of Historic Places.

== History ==
Benjamin Franklin Smallwood was an important leader of the Choctaw. He was representative to the Choctaw nation from 1847 to 1887. As a representative, he held the office of speaker for many years and was the leader of the National Party. He was elected Principal Chief of Choctaw Nation in 1888 and served for two years as chief. Because he refused to meet with United States government officials unless they came to his home, his home was where important meetings of Choctaw legislators, religious leaders, and members of the United States Congress were held. The house was originally part of a 500-acre farm that included four mineral springs. In 1982, the house was added to the National Register of Historic Places. It is the last surviving structure associated with Smallwood.

At the time it was built, the Smallwood House was located in Atoka County, a part of the Pushmataha District of the Choctaw Nation.

== Architecture ==
The house is a two-story sandstone building measuring 50 by 50 feet (15 by 15 m). The roof is gone; it was originally a gabled roof. The building has sixteen windows; those on the second floor measure 5 by 3 feet, and those on the first floor are 3 feet square. At the time of the national register application in 1982, the walls were intact except for a cave-in on the south side above a second-story window. On the north wall, there is a chimney and fireplace. The house has a stone porch, which has been forced away from the rest of the house by tree roots.
