= Cherokee Friends Church =

Historic church in Oklahoma, United States

- U.S. National Register of Historic Places
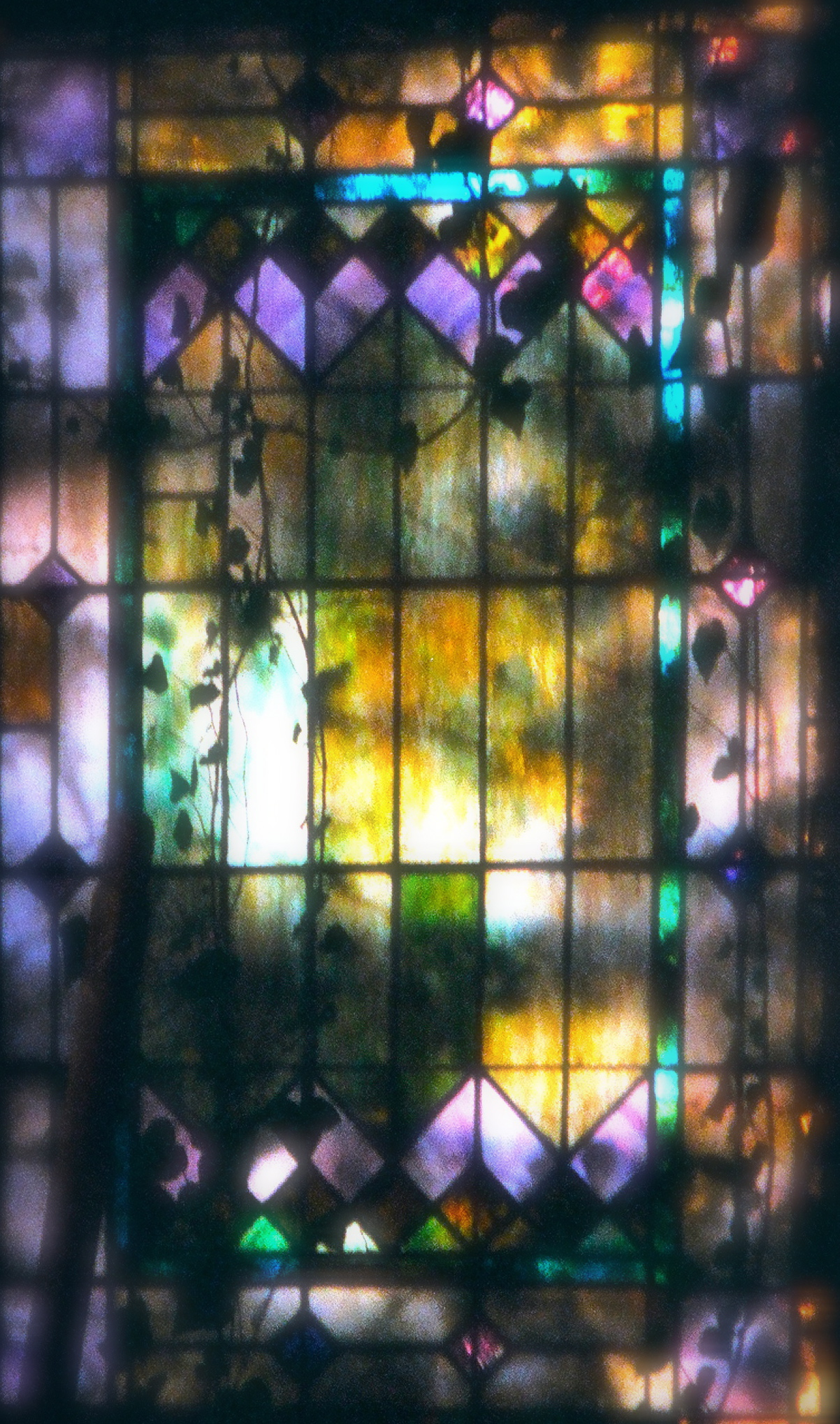

- Location within Oklahoma Location within the United States
- Location: 120 S. Pennsylvania, Cherokee, Oklahoma
- Coordinates: 36°45′25″N 98°21′14″W
- Area: 1 acre (0.40 ha)
- Built: 1919
- Built by: Smith, Edward
- Architectural style: Bungalow/craftsman
- NRHP reference No.: 04001337
- Added to NRHP: December 6, 2004

Cherokee Friends Church is a Society of Friends church in the city of Cherokee, Oklahoma. Its original church, located at 120 S. Pennsylvania in Cherokee, was added to the National Register of Historic Places in 2004.

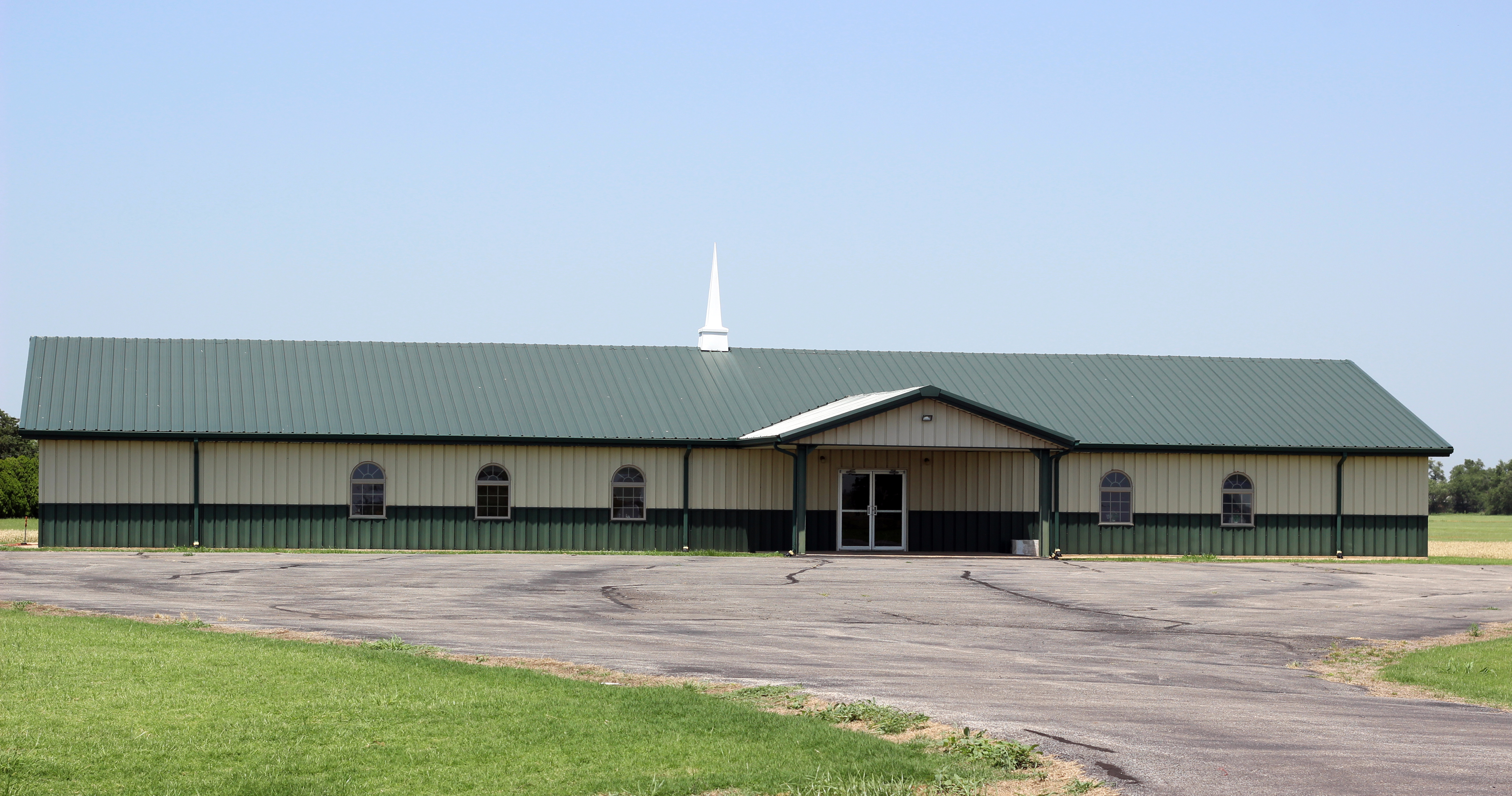
Cherokee Friends Church (2003 building)

Because of structural problems to the original church, in 2003 the Friends Church moved to a new building at 61177 Grant Road in Cherokee.

The church grew from about 75 members in 1902 to almost 300 members by 1919. Its historic building, built during 1919-20 by contractor Edward Smith, is a two-story, red brick Craftsman-style building.

The historic church's is "unique in its design among churches in the greater Cherokee area. It utilizes a style influenced heavily by the Craftsman movement espoused by Gustaf Stickley and found most often in residential architecture. Other churches in the area, contemporaneous with the Friends Church, conform to the more traditional Gothic or Classical Revival styles. The Craftsman ethos dovetails well with the philosophy of the Quakers. Stickley states, when describing the Craftsmai Ideal in homebuilding, that he plans '...houses that are based on the big fundamental principals of honesty, simplicity, and usefulness.. .' The Cherokee Friends Church adheres to this principal in that its very form is honest, its decor is simple, its layout is useful."
