= Olney, Oklahoma =

Unincorporated community in Oklahoma, US

Olney, Oklahoma Pʋla Misha (Choctaw)
- Unincorporated community
- Location within the state of Oklahoma Olney (the United States)
- Coordinates: 34°28′21″N 96°21′40″W
- Country: United States
- State: Oklahoma
- County: Coal
- Elevation: 617 ft (188 m)
- Time zone: UTC-6 (Central (CST))
  - Summer (DST): UTC-5 (CDT)
- GNIS feature ID: 1096264

Olney is an unincorporated community in Coal County, Oklahoma, United States. It is located seven miles west of Lehigh.

== History ==
The community was founded by Eliphalet Nott and James Brooks Wright, who were the sons of Choctaw leader Allen Wright. The community was originally named Parmicho, after the Choctaw words "pala misha," which mean "lighted place in the distance." The name came from a lantern hanging at the railway station. The town's name was changed to Olney on July 12, 1902.
