= Coal County, Oklahoma =

County in Oklahoma, United States

- County
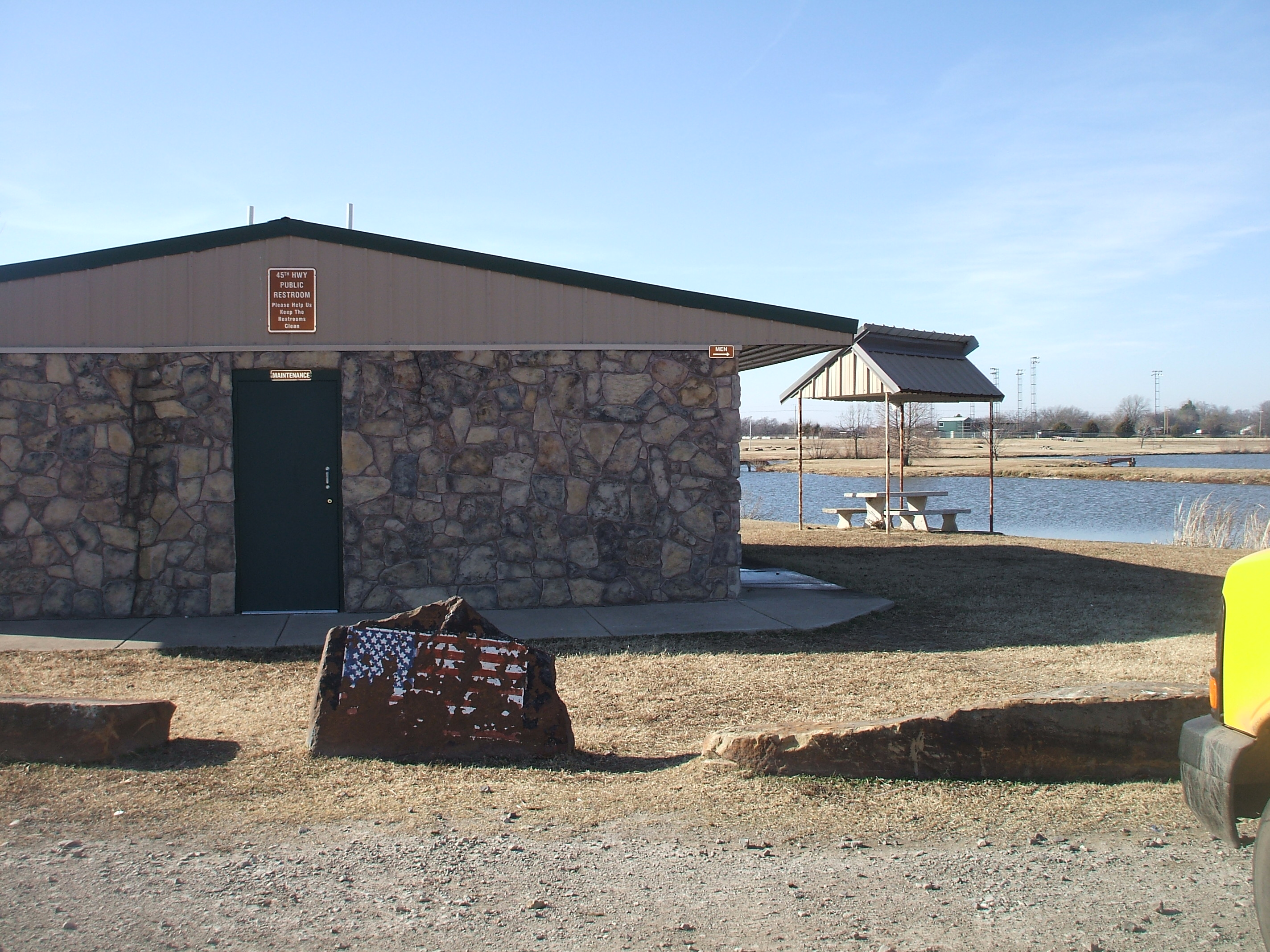
- Park in Coalgate

- Location within the U.S. state of Oklahoma
- Coordinates: 34°36′N 96°18′W
- Country: United States
- State: Oklahoma
- Founded: 1907
- Seat: Coalgate
- Largest city: Coalgate

Area
  - Total: 521 sq mi (1,350 km^{2})
  - Land: 517 sq mi (1,340 km^{2})
  - Water: 4.7 sq mi (12 km^{2}) 0.9%

Population (2020)
  - Total: 5,266
  - Estimate (2025): 5,436 ▲
  - Density: 10.2/sq mi (3.93/km^{2})
- Time zone: UTC−6 (Central)
  - Summer (DST): UTC−5 (CDT)
- Congressional district: 2nd
- Website: https://coal.okcounties.org/

Coal County is a county located in the U.S. state of Oklahoma. As of the 2020 census, the population was 5,266. Its county seat is Coalgate.

== History ==
Coal County was formed at statehood from the former Shappaway County (later renamed Atoka County) of the Pushmataha District of the Choctaw Nation in Indian Territory. A 3.5 miles (5.6 km) strip of Coal County was taken from the Pontotoc District of the Chickasaw Nation. Initially, the Oklahoma legislature named Lehigh as the county seat, but a special election held in 1908 resulted in the citizens choosing Coalgate as the county seat. Lehigh tried to sue because more people voted than were registered, but no court would hear the case.

Mining became a mainstay of the county's economy during the 1870s. The first coal mine opened on Chief Allen Wright's land. The industry activity peaked between 1910 and 1916 but declined sharply after World War I. Many of the mines closed by 1921, due to the refusal of mining companies of the area to unionize. Some mines reopened during World War II, but these closed by 1958, because of the rising cost of refining sulfur out of the coal mined.

Agriculture replaced mining as the main economic activity of the county. Even this business encountered severe difficulty in 1921–1923 when a boll weevil infestation wiped out the cotton crop. All five banks in the county failed as a result.

== Geography ==
Coal County is in southeastern Oklahoma, in a 10-county area designated for tourism purposes by the Oklahoma Department of Tourism and Recreation as Choctaw Country. According to the U.S. Census Bureau, the county has a total area of 521 square miles (1,350 km^{2}), of which 517 square miles (1,340 km^{2}) is land and 4.7 square miles (12 km^{2}) (0.9%) is water. It is the fifth-smallest county in Oklahoma by area. The eastern part of the county lies in the Ouachita Mountains, while the western part has open prairie and lies in the Sandstone Hills physiographic region. The county is drained by the Clear Boggy and Muddy Boggy creeks.

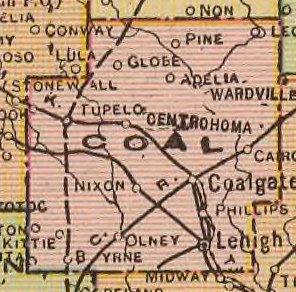
Map of Coal County, 1909

=== Major highways ===
- U.S. Highway 75
- State Highway 3
- State Highway 31
  - State Highway 31B
- State Highway 43
- State Highway 48
- State Highway 131

=== Adjacent counties ===
- Hughes County (north)
- Pittsburg County (northeast)
- Atoka County (southeast)
- Johnston County (southwest)
- Pontotoc County (west)

== Demographics ==
Historical population
Census	Pop.	Note	%±
1910	15,817		—
1920	18,406		16.4%
1930	11,521		−37.4%
1940	12,811		11.2%
1950	8,056		−37.1%
1960	5,546		−31.2%
1970	5,525		−0.4%
1980	6,041		9.3%
1990	5,780		−4.3%
2000	6,031		4.3%
2010	5,925		−1.8%
2020	5,266		−11.1%
2025 (est.)	5,436	▲	3.2%
U.S. Decennial Census; 1790-1960 1900-1990; 1990-2000 2010

=== 2020 census ===
As of the 2020 census, the county had a population of 5,266. The median age was 42.8 years. 23.1% of residents were under the age of 18 and 20.9% of residents were 65 years of age or older. For every 100 females there were 97.5 males, and for every 100 females age 18 and over there were 96.0 males age 18 and over. 0.0% of residents lived in urban areas, while 100.0% lived in rural areas.

The racial makeup of the county was 65.3% White, 0.5% Black or African American, 19.7% American Indian and Alaska Native, 0.3% Asian, 0.0% Native Hawaiian and Pacific Islander, 1.6% from some other race, and 12.5% from two or more races. Hispanic or Latino residents of any race comprised 3.8% of the population.

There were 2,116 households in the county, of which 29.3% had children under the age of 18 living with them and 25.8% had a female householder with no spouse or partner present. About 29.9% of all households were made up of individuals and 14.1% had someone living alone who was 65 years of age or older.

There were 2,569 housing units, of which 17.6% were vacant. Among occupied housing units, 74.2% were owner-occupied and 25.8% were renter-occupied. The homeowner vacancy rate was 2.0% and the rental vacancy rate was 19.6%. There were 31,378 housing units, of which 11.8% were vacant. Among occupied housing units, 66.4% were owner-occupied and 33.6% were renter-occupied. The homeowner vacancy rate was 1.7% and the rental vacancy rate was 5.0%.

=== 2010 census ===
As of the 2010 United States census, there were 5,925 people, 2,350 households, and 1,604 families residing in the county. There were 2,810 housing units. The racial makeup of the county was 74.3% White, 0.5% Black or African American, 16.7% Native American, 0.2% Asian, 0.5% from other races, and 7.8% from two or more races. 2.6% of the population were Hispanic or Latino of any race.

There were 2,350 households, out of which 27.7% had children under the age of 18 living with them, 50.8% were married couples living together, 12.1% had a female householder with no husband present, and 31.7% were non-families. 28.1% of all households were made up of individuals, and 14.6% had someone living alone who was 65 years of age or older. The average household size was 2.50 and the average family size was 3.06.

In the county, the population was spread out, with 25.5% under the age of 18, 7.2% from 18 to 24, 21.7% from 25 to 44, 27.8% from 45 to 64, and 17.8% who were 65 years of age or older. The median age was 41.0 years. For every 100 females there were 97.7 males. For every 100 females age 18 and over, there were 91.5 males.

According to the 2013 American Community Survey, the median income for a household in the county was $34,867, and the median income for a family was $44,888. Male full-time, year round workers had a median income of $36,442 compared to $26,450 for female full-time, year round workers. The per capita income for the county was $19,752. About 15.8% of families and 21.6% of the population were below the poverty line, including 35.9% of those under age 18 and 15.7% of those age 65 or over.

According to the 2000 census, 94.6% spoke English, 3.0% Spanish, 1.1% German and 1.1% Choctaw as their first language.

== Politics ==
Coal County is in many respects typical of Oklahoma politics. Once a predominantly Democratic county, its elections have become dominated by the Republican Party in recent years. In 1972, Richard Nixon became the first Republican to ever carry the county in a presidential election, and was the only one to do so until the 2000 election. Coal County extremely narrowly supported two Democrats amidst national Republican landslides: James M. Cox by 24 votes in 1920 and Walter Mondale by 25 votes in 1984. The county swung 41 points Republican in the 2008 presidential election, the largest swing of any county in the country.

Voter Registration and Party Enrollment as of February 28, 2026
Party	Number of Voters	Percentage
Republican	2,016	52.97%
Democratic	1,263	33.18%
Libertarian	21	0.55%
Others	506	13.29%
Total	3,806	100.00%

United States presidential election results for Coal County, Oklahoma
Year	Republican		Democratic		Third party(ies)	
Year	No.	%	No.	%	No.	%
1908	722	33.55%	906	42.10%	524	24.35%
1912	571	25.33%	1,109	49.20%	574	25.47%
1916	824	29.12%	1,418	50.11%	588	20.78%
1920	1,744	43.63%	1,768	44.23%	485	12.13%
1924	800	25.17%	1,772	55.74%	607	19.09%
1928	1,283	42.82%	1,681	56.11%	32	1.07%
1932	300	9.72%	2,788	90.28%	0	0.00%
1936	603	19.08%	2,550	80.70%	7	0.22%
1940	1,148	32.48%	2,377	67.24%	10	0.28%
1944	760	27.90%	1,959	71.92%	5	0.18%
1948	464	17.93%	2,124	82.07%	0	0.00%
1952	1,106	38.66%	1,755	61.34%	0	0.00%
1956	920	36.57%	1,596	63.43%	0	0.00%
1960	1,019	44.54%	1,269	55.46%	0	0.00%
1964	721	30.89%	1,613	69.11%	0	0.00%
1968	669	29.64%	963	42.67%	625	27.69%
1972	1,461	67.05%	680	31.21%	38	1.74%
1976	769	29.97%	1,774	69.13%	23	0.90%
1980	926	38.09%	1,442	59.32%	63	2.59%
1984	1,259	49.10%	1,284	50.08%	21	0.82%
1988	891	39.25%	1,365	60.13%	14	0.62%
1992	714	25.50%	1,448	51.71%	638	22.79%
1996	734	32.25%	1,205	52.94%	337	14.81%
2000	1,196	50.64%	1,148	48.60%	18	0.76%
2004	1,396	53.71%	1,203	46.29%	0	0.00%
2008	1,672	73.59%	600	26.41%	0	0.00%
2012	1,710	72.49%	649	27.51%	0	0.00%
2016	1,898	79.12%	411	17.13%	90	3.75%
2020	2,091	82.84%	374	14.82%	59	2.34%
2024	2,155	84.91%	345	13.59%	38	1.50%

== Communities ==
=== Cities ===
- Coalgate (county seat)
- Centrahoma
- Lehigh
- Tupelo

=== Towns ===
- Bromide
- Phillips

=== Census-designated places ===
- Clarita
- Cottonwood

=== Other unincorporated communities ===
- Cairo
- Olney

== NRHP sites ==
The following sites in Coal County are listed on the National Register of Historic Places:

- Benjamin Franklin Smallwood House, Lehigh
- Coalgate School Gymnasium-Auditorium, Coalgate
- Keel Creek Bridge, Coalgate
- Merchants National Bank Building, Lehigh
- United States Post Office Coalgate, Coalgate
