= McCurtain, Oklahoma =

- Town
- Location within Oklahoma
- Coordinates: 35°09′03″N 94°58′01″W
- Country: United States
- State: Oklahoma
- County: Haskell

Government
  - Type: Incorporated

Area
  - Total: 1.13 sq mi (2.92 km^{2})
  - Land: 1.11 sq mi (2.87 km^{2})
  - Water: 0.019 sq mi (0.05 km^{2})
- Elevation: 627 ft (191 m)

Population (2020)
  - Total: 355
  - Density: 321/sq mi (123.8/km^{2})
- Time zone: UTC-6 (Central (CST))
  - Summer (DST): UTC-5 (CDT)
- ZIP code: 74944
- Area codes: 539/918
- FIPS code: 40-44950
- GNIS feature ID: 2412967

McCurtain is a town in Haskell County, Oklahoma, United States. The population was 357 at the 2020 census, a 30.8% decrease over the figure of 516 recorded in 2010. A coal mine disaster in 1912 killed 73 miners and ended McCurtain's prosperity. The mine explosion remains one of the worst disasters in Oklahoma history.

== History ==
In 1889, coal deposits discovered in the area that would become southern Haskell County attracted some European miners and American entrepreneurs. They established a community called Panther, which was renamed in 1902 to honor Choctaw Principal Chief Green McCurtain. Another mining town, Chant, was established nearby, and the two began to grow together. McCurtain and Chant prospered after the Fort Smith and Western Railroad connected McCurtain with Fort Smith, Arkansas in 1901. The railroad was built westward until it reached the Canadian River in 1902. The San Bois Coal Company built four hundred company houses for miners living in McCurtain and Chant. By 1907 statehood the combined population of the two communities was 1,760.

A post office was established at Panther, Indian Territory on June 11, 1890. Its name was changed to McCurtain, Indian Territory on April 5, 1902. The site was located one half-mile west of its present site. At the time of its founding, the community was located in the Moshulatubbee District of the Choctaw Nation.

In 1901 the two towns thrived as the Fort Smith and Western Railroad built to McCurtain, connecting it with Fort Smith, Arkansas. In 1902 the railroad continued building westward, reaching the South (main) Canadian River. The San Bois Coal Company built four hundred company houses, and McCurtain, as well as Chant, saw the addition of banks, stores, schools, newspapers, and even a bottling company. By 1907 statehood the combined population of the communities stood at 1,760, although in 1908 business directories suggested a combined population of 3,800, which would have been the largest to be seen in Haskell County. Newspapers that have served the two communities included the Haskell County Chant News, the Hustler, McCurtain American, McCurtain Leader, and Sans Bois News.

The towns and all of their successes, however, could not withstand the events of March 20, 1912, when a terrific underground explosion in Mine Number Two took the lives of seventy-three miners and sent the San Bois Coal Company into bankruptcy. With mining all but played out, the town's combined population dropped to 1,341 in 1920. The communities officially consolidated in 1922, but the Chant post office had closed in 1910. In 1940 the population rested at 870, declining to 528 by 1960. By 2000 the last of the mines had all closed. The town's population had dwindled to 466, a downward trend that reversed; in 2010 the number stood at 516. The only reminder of McCurtain's once-prosperous past was a memorial standing silently at the site of old Mine Number Two and seventy-three graves in the nearby Miners Cemetery. According to the Encyclopedia of Oklahoma History and Culture, "The only reminder McCurtain had to show of its once prosperous past was a memorial standing silently at the site of old Mine Number Two and seventy-three graves in the nearby Miners Cemetery."

== Economic Development ==
McCurtain's rapid economic transformation began with the discovery of coal in 1889, the same year as the Land Run. This discovery attracted a diverse influx of people, including Eastern European miners and American entrepreneurs, fueling the town's growth. At the forefront of this mining boom was the Sans Bois Mining Company, or Sans Bois Coal Company. In 1901, industrialist Henry Clay Frick, determined to source coal in his steel operations, purchased the Sans Bois Coal Company through ownership of the Fort Smith and Western Railway.

The town of McCurtain faced successive decades of economic decline following the tragic explosion at San Bois Coal Company's Mine Number Two. The 1912 tragedy would claim the lives of 73 miners and would begin a series of decades that included substantial population decline, decreases in job opportunities in the area, economically depressed residents would grow accustomed to severe poverty and even the next several generations that remained in the area live at or below the poverty level.

== Geography ==
McCurtain is 57 miles (92 km) east of McAlester and 28 miles (45 km) south southwest of Sallisaw.

According to the United States Census Bureau, the town has a total area of 1.1 square miles (2.8 km^{2}), of which 1.1 square miles (2.8 km^{2}) is land and 0.04 square miles (0.10 km^{2}) (1.77%) is water.

Historical population
Census	Pop.	Note	%±
1910	526		—
1920	1,062		101.9%
1930	934		−12.1%
1940	870		−6.9%
1950	705		−19.0%
1960	528		−25.1%
1970	575		8.9%
1980	549		−4.5%
1990	465		−15.3%
2000	466		0.2%
2010	516		10.7%
2020	355		−31.2%
U.S. Decennial Census

== Demographics ==
=== 2020 census ===
As of the 2020 census, McCurtain had a population of 355. The median age was 38.8 years. 28.5% of residents were under the age of 18 and 18.3% of residents were 65 years of age or older. For every 100 females there were 86.8 males, and for every 100 females age 18 and over there were 82.7 males age 18 and over.

0.0% of residents lived in urban areas, while 100.0% lived in rural areas.

There were 148 households in McCurtain, of which 39.2% had children under the age of 18 living in them. Of all households, 43.2% were married-couple households, 12.2% were households with a male householder and no spouse or partner present, and 37.2% were households with a female householder and no spouse or partner present. About 25.0% of all households were made up of individuals and 11.5% had someone living alone who was 65 years of age or older.

There were 159 housing units, of which 6.9% were vacant. The homeowner vacancy rate was 2.1% and the rental vacancy rate was 5.3%.

Racial composition as of the 2020 census
Race	Number	Percent
White	215	60.6%
Black or African American	1	0.3%
American Indian and Alaska Native	90	25.4%
Asian	0	0.0%
Native Hawaiian and Other Pacific Islander	2	0.6%
Some other race	6	1.7%
Two or more races	41	11.5%
Hispanic or Latino (of any race)	11	3.1%

=== 2000 census ===
As of the 2000 census, there were 466 people, 178 households, and 122 families residing in the town. The population density was 420.5 inhabitants per square mile (162.4/km^{2}). There were 213 housing units at an average density of 192.2 units per square mile (74.2 units/km^{2}). The racial makeup of the town was 75.54% White, 16.74% Native American, 1.29% Asian, and 6.44% from two or more races. Hispanic or Latino of any race were 1.29% of the population.

There were 178 households, out of which 36.0% had children under the age of 18 living with them, 54.5% were married couples living together, 11.8% had a female householder with no husband present, and 30.9% were non-families. 29.8% of all households were made up of individuals, and 17.4% had someone living alone who was 65 years of age or older. The average household size was 2.62 and the average family size was 3.28.

In the town, the population was spread out, with 30.5% under the age of 18, 9.2% from 18 to 24, 24.2% from 25 to 44, 21.7% from 45 to 64, and 14.4% who were 65 years of age or older. The median age was 34 years. For every 100 females, there were 95.8 males. For every 100 females age 18 and over, there were 97.6 males.

The median income for a household in the town was $22,188, and the median income for a family was $29,167. Males had a median income of $29,167 versus $15,833 for females. The per capita income for the town was $11,410. About 16.2% of families and 22.5% of the population were below the poverty line, including 28.2% of those under age 18 and 25.0% of those age 65 or over.
