= Lehigh, Oklahoma =

City in Oklahoma, US

- City
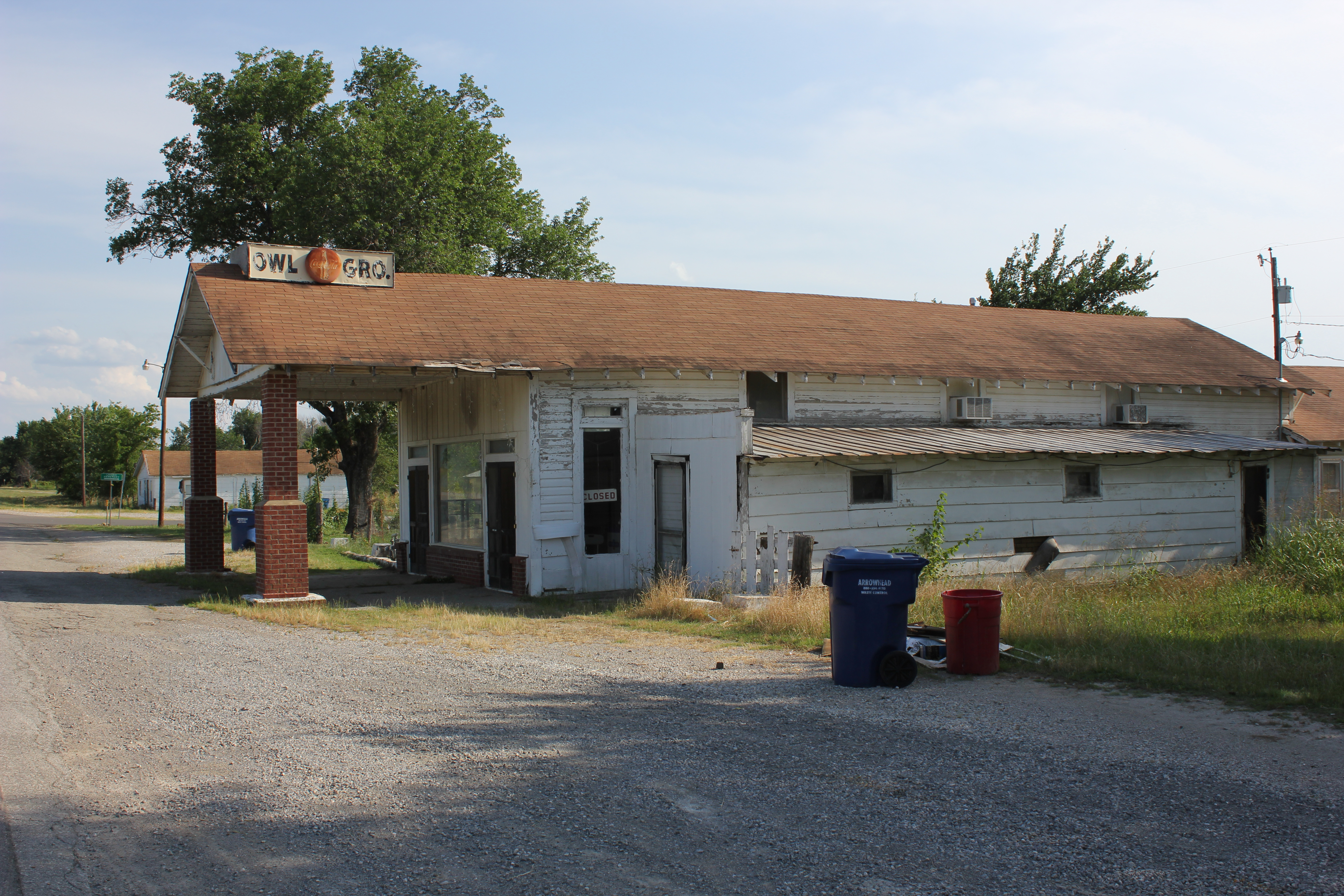
- Owl Grocery in Lehigh, 2012

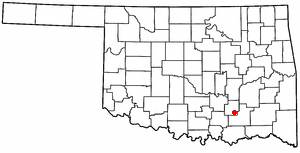
- Location of Lehigh, Oklahoma
- Coordinates: 34°28′14″N 96°13′15″W
- Country: United States
- State: Oklahoma
- County: Coal

Area
  - Total: 1.62 sq mi (4.20 km^{2})
  - Land: 1.57 sq mi (4.07 km^{2})
  - Water: 0.054 sq mi (0.14 km^{2})
- Elevation: 600 ft (180 m)

Population (2020)
  - Total: 272
  - Density: 173.1/sq mi (66.84/km^{2})
- Time zone: UTC-6 (Central (CST))
  - Summer (DST): UTC-5 (CDT)
- ZIP code: 74556
- Area code: 580
- FIPS code: 40-42200
- GNIS feature ID: 2410817

Lehigh is a city in Coal County, Oklahoma, United States. Its population was 272 at the 2020 census.

== History ==
Lehigh began as the first mining camp in what is now Coal County, Oklahoma. At the time of its founding, Lehigh was located in Atoka County, Choctaw Nation. It was originally named Boone, but the name was changed to Lehigh. The new name was taken from Lehigh County, Pennsylvania, a coal-mining region.

A post office opened in Lehigh, Indian Territory, on April 4, 1882, and several railroads built lines to Lehigh, including the Missouri–Kansas–Texas Railroad, the Chicago, Rock Island and Pacific Railway, and the Gulf, Colorado and Santa Fe Railway. (Note: At least one other railroad, the Clinton and Oklahoma Western Railway Company, was chartered specifically to build a line to Lehigh—this one from Clinton, Oklahoma—but never did so. This company did build a line in the opposite direction, becoming the Clinton and Oklahoma Western Railroad.) In addition to mining, ranching was an important contributor to the local economy. Stockyards were built in 1884 and, even as they neared completion, 23 railroad cars of cattle and seven carloads of hogs awaited shipping.

During the late 19th and early 20th centuries, Lehigh was a growing settlement that greatly profited from the coal mines surrounding it. During the 1910s and 1920s, the demand for coal lessened as railroads switched to oil-powered trains. (Note: By the time of the Thirty-sixth annual report of the Department of Mines and Minerals in 1943, combined yearly production by the Lehigh Coal Company, Dawley Coal Company and the Wells Coal Company—all of Lehigh—was 2,562 tons. For comparison, combined production by companies in Henryetta, Oklahoma, that year was over 600,000 tons.) The mines eventually closed, and in the early 1920s, boll weevils destroyed the cotton crops in the area. Many businesses closed, and people left the town. The Merchants National Bank Building in Lehigh is the only structure that remains from the once-prosperous downtown area.

== Geography ==
Lehigh is located in southeastern Coal County. U.S. Route 75 passes through the city, leading north 5 miles (8 km) to Coalgate, the county seat, and southeast 9 miles (14 km) to Atoka.

According to the United States Census Bureau, the city has a total area of 1.6 square miles (4.1 km^{2}), of which 0.04 square miles (0.10 km^{2}) (2.47%) is covered by water.

=== Climate ===
Climate data for Lehigh, Oklahoma
Month	Jan	Feb	Mar	Apr	May	Jun	Jul	Aug	Sep	Oct	Nov	Dec	Year
Mean daily maximum °F (°C)	49.2 (9.6)	54.6 (12.6)	63.9 (17.7)	73.5 (23.1)	79.6 (26.4)	87.4 (30.8)	93.4 (34.1)	94.1 (34.5)	85.7 (29.8)	75.7 (24.3)	63.4 (17.4)	52.9 (11.6)	72.8 (22.7)
Mean daily minimum °F (°C)	27.0 (−2.8)	31.4 (−0.3)	40.6 (4.8)	50.2 (10.1)	58.5 (14.7)	66.6 (19.2)	71.0 (21.7)	70.1 (21.2)	63.0 (17.2)	51.3 (10.7)	40.9 (4.9)	30.9 (−0.6)	50.1 (10.1)
Average precipitation inches (mm)	2.0 (51)	2.5 (64)	3.6 (91)	4.6 (120)	5.3 (130)	4.2 (110)	2.5 (64)	2.5 (64)	4.8 (120)	3.7 (94)	3.2 (81)	2.3 (58)	41.3 (1,050)
Source 1: weather.com
Source 2: Weatherbase.com

== Demographics ==
Historical population
Census	Pop.	Note	%±
1900	1,500		—
1910	1,880		25.3%
1920	1,898		1.0%
1930	497		−73.8%
1940	519		4.4%
1950	352		−32.2%
1960	296		−15.9%
1970	296		0.0%
1980	284		−4.1%
1990	303		6.7%
2000	315		4.0%
2010	356		13.0%
2020	272		−23.6%
U.S. Decennial Census

=== 2020 census ===
As of the 2020 census, Lehigh had a population of 272. The median age was 49.1 years, with 20.2% of residents under the age of 18 and 25.0% aged 65 or older. For every 100 females there were 100.0 males, and for every 100 females age 18 and over there were 100.9 males age 18 and over.

All residents lived in rural areas.

There were 118 households in Lehigh, of which 28.8% had children under the age of 18 living in them. Of all households, 44.1% were married-couple households, 22.9% were households with a male householder and no spouse or partner present, and 28.0% were households with a female householder and no spouse or partner present. About 27.1% of all households were made up of individuals and 14.4% had someone living alone who was 65 years of age or older. There were 130 housing units, of which 9.2% were vacant. Among occupied housing units, 74.6% were owner-occupied and 25.4% were renter-occupied. The homeowner vacancy rate was 2.1% and the rental vacancy rate was 8.8%.

Racial composition as of the 2020 census
Race	Percent
White	65.4%
Black or African American	<0.1%
American Indian and Alaska Native	9.9%
Asian	0.4%
Native Hawaiian and Other Pacific Islander	<0.1%
Some other race	10.3%
Two or more races	14.0%
Hispanic or Latino (of any race)	2.2%

=== 2000 census ===
As of the 2000 census, 315 people, 114 households and 77 families were residing in the city. The population density was 199.9 inhabitants per square mile (77.2/km^{2}). The 144 housing units had an average density of 91.4 per square mile (35.3/km^{2}). The racial makeup of the city was 76.51% White, 0.95% African American, 14.92% Native American, 0.95% Asian, and 6.67% from two or more races. Hispanics or Latinos of any race were 1.27% of the population.

Of the 114 households, 29.8% had children under 18 living with them, 50.9% were married couples living together, 10.5% had a female householder with no husband present, and 31.6% were not families. About 24.6% of all households were made up of individuals, and 8.8% had someone living alone who was 65 or older. The average household size was 2.76, and the average family size was 3.26.

The age distribution was 28.9% under 18, 9.2% from 18 to 24, 26.7% from 25 to 44, 21.3% from 45 to 64, and 14.0% who were 65 or older. The median age was 35 years. For every 100 females, there were 111.4 males. For every 100 females 18 and over, there were 101.8 males.

The median household income was $24,16, and the median family income was $25,156. Males had a median income of $20,278 compared with $17,344 for females. The per capita income was $10,699. About 18.8% of families and 27.7% of the population were below the poverty line, including 37.8% of those under 18 and 12.5% of those 65 or over.

== Notable people ==
- Rube Foster, baseball player who won World Series championships with the Boston Red Sox in 1915 and 1916
- Patrick J. Hurley, U.S. Secretary of War from 1929 to 1933
- Benjamin Franklin Smallwood, principal chief of Choctaw Nation from 1888 to 1890
- Muriel Hazel Wright, historian, was born here in 1889.

== See also ==
- List of municipalities in Oklahoma
