= Carmen, Oklahoma =

Town in Oklahoma, US

- Town
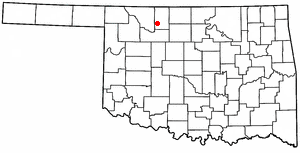
- Location of Carmen, Oklahoma
- Coordinates: 36°34′45″N 98°27′28″W
- Country: United States
- State: Oklahoma
- County: Alfalfa

Area
  - Total: 1.53 sq mi (3.95 km^{2})
  - Land: 1.53 sq mi (3.95 km^{2})
  - Water: 0 sq mi (0.00 km^{2})
- Elevation: 1,348 ft (411 m)

Population (2020)
  - Total: 360
  - Density: 236.3/sq mi (91.22/km^{2})
- Time zone: UTC-6 (Central (CST))
  - Summer (DST): UTC-5 (CDT)
- ZIP code: 73726
- Area code: 580
- FIPS code: 40-12000
- GNIS feature ID: 2413170

Carmen is a town in Alfalfa County, Oklahoma, United States. As of the 2020 census, Carmen had a population of 360.

== Geography ==
Carmen lies along State Highway 45.

According to the United States Census Bureau, the town has a total area of 1.5 square miles (3.9 km^{2}), all land.

== Demographics ==
Historical population
Census	Pop.	Note	%±
1910	883		—
1920	792		−10.3%
1930	904		14.1%
1940	818		−9.5%
1950	654		−20.0%
1960	533		−18.5%
1970	519		−2.6%
1980	516		−0.6%
1990	459		−11.0%
2000	411		−10.5%
2010	355		−13.6%
2020	360		1.4%
U.S. Decennial Census

=== 2020 census ===
As of the 2020 census, Carmen had a population of 360. The median age was 41.8 years. 25.8% of residents were under the age of 18 and 21.4% of residents were 65 years of age or older. For every 100 females there were 110.5 males, and for every 100 females age 18 and over there were 107.0 males age 18 and over.

0.0% of residents lived in urban areas, while 100.0% lived in rural areas.

There were 163 households in Carmen, of which 33.1% had children under the age of 18 living in them. Of all households, 42.9% were married-couple households, 25.8% were households with a male householder and no spouse or partner present, and 21.5% were households with a female householder and no spouse or partner present. About 29.5% of all households were made up of individuals and 15.3% had someone living alone who was 65 years of age or older.

There were 211 housing units, of which 22.7% were vacant. The homeowner vacancy rate was 0.0% and the rental vacancy rate was 18.2%.

Racial composition as of the 2020 census
Race	Number	Percent
White	316	87.8%
Black or African American	1	0.3%
American Indian and Alaska Native	8	2.2%
Asian	1	0.3%
Native Hawaiian and Other Pacific Islander	0	0.0%
Some other race	4	1.1%
Two or more races	30	8.3%
Hispanic or Latino (of any race)	18	5.0%

=== 2000 census ===
As of the census of 2000, there were 411 people, 175 households, and 110 families residing in the town. The population density was 272.0 inhabitants per square mile (105.0/km^{2}). There were 248 housing units at an average density of 164.2 per square mile (63.4/km^{2}). The racial makeup of the town was 94.89% White, 0.49% African American, 1.95% Native American, 0.49% from other races, and 2.19% from two or more races. Hispanic or Latino of any race were 1.70% of the population.

There were 175 households, out of which 26.9% had children under the age of 18 living with them, 53.1% were married couples living together, 7.4% had a female householder with no husband present, and 37.1% were non-families. 34.3% of all households were made up of individuals, and 18.9% had someone living alone who was 65 years of age or older. The average household size was 2.35 and the average family size was 3.04.

In the town, the population was spread out, with 24.8% under the age of 18, 6.8% from 18 to 24, 22.4% from 25 to 44, 22.4% from 45 to 64, and 23.6% who were 65 years of age or older. The median age was 42 years. For every 100 females, there were 82.7 males. For every 100 females age 18 and over, there were 82.8 males.

The median income for a household in the town was $25,769, and the median income for a family was $31,354. Males had a median income of $26,944 versus $21,250 for females. The per capita income for the town was $16,833. About 19.8% of families and 25.0% of the population were below the poverty line, including 48.0% of those under age 18 and 6.3% of those age 65 or over.

== Education ==
Carmen shared a school district with the nearby town of Dacoma until the school was closed.
