= Coalgate, Oklahoma =

City in Oklahoma, US

- City
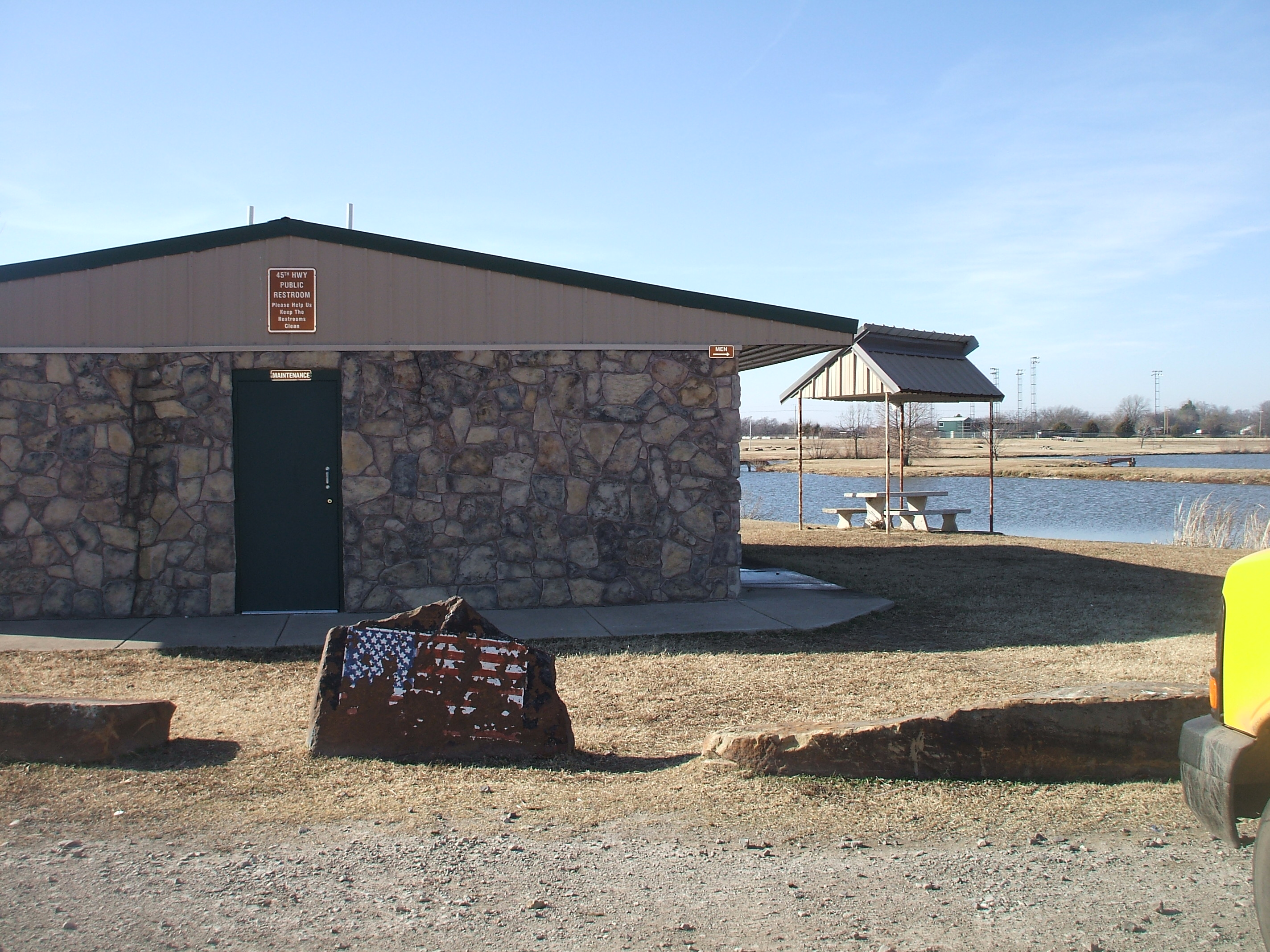
- A park in the south part of Coalgate

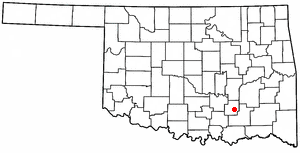
- Location of Coalgate, Oklahoma
- Coordinates: 34°31′56″N 96°13′15″W
- Country: United States
- State: Oklahoma
- County: Coal

Area
  - Total: 1.86 sq mi (4.81 km^{2})
  - Land: 1.81 sq mi (4.70 km^{2})
  - Water: 0.039 sq mi (0.10 km^{2})
- Elevation: 614 ft (187 m)

Population (2020)
  - Total: 1,667
  - Density: 917.9/sq mi (354.41/km^{2})
- Time zone: UTC-6 (Central (CST))
  - Summer (DST): UTC-5 (CDT)
- ZIP code: 74538
- Area code: 580
- FIPS code: 40-15800
- GNIS feature ID: 2409494
- Website: www.cityofcoalgate.com

Coalgate is a city in and the county seat of Coal County, Oklahoma, United States. As of the 2020 census, Coalgate had a population of 1,667. The town was founded in 1889 in the Choctaw Nation, Indian Territory as a coal mining camp named Liddle. The name changed to Coalgate on January 23, 1890.

== History ==
Coalgate was founded in 1889 as a coal mining camp named Liddle in Atoka County, a territorial-era county in the Pushmataha District of the Choctaw Nation, Indian Territory. It was named for William "Bill" Liddle, a superintendent for the Atoka Coal and Mining Company, who had arrived in the fall of 1888 to locate a site for a new coal mine. The Southwestern Coal and Improvement Company, a subsidiary of the Missouri, Kansas and Texas Railway (MK&T) developed the site. A tent city sprung up, followed by company-built houses. Work on the mine started January 2, 1889, and the first shipment of coal left Liddle on April 17, 1889. The town name changed to Coalgate on January 23, 1890. The new name was taken from the steel gate or "coal gate" that separated the trains from the coal mines north of town. (Note: A different story claimed that the town was named for Coalgate Hoyt, then president of the MK&T. However, the Oklahoma Tax Commission has written that this version has been discredited.) Coalgate incorporated under the laws of Arkansas on November 25, 1898. It was platted and approved by the Secretary of the Interior on December 16, 1903.

Coal County was created at statehood in 1907. Initially, Lehigh, Oklahoma was designated as county seat. However, a special election held on June 2, 1908, moved the seat to Coalgate. A new charter was approved on June 16, 1914.

Coalgate had grown to a population of 2,921 by statehood in 1907 and in one year the population had increased to 3,500. The city had at least 65 merchants plus carpenters, doctors, veterinarians, and as many as seven attorneys and three newspapers. The streets in the downtown area were bricked in 1912. In 1911, the weekly newspaper Coalgate Record Register was first published in Coalgate. Robinson Publishing Company took over publication of the newspaper in 1988. It has a circulation of 2,300.

Coalgate was the site of the very first bank closing performed by the State of Oklahoma when the International Bank of Coalgate was closed on May 21, 1908, and Herman C. Schultz, acting as an Assistant State Bank Commissioner, liquidated the bank, paying off all depositors in full and returning the excess to the bank's shareholders.

During the May–June 1917 tornado outbreak sequence, at 4 p.m. on June 1, 1917, Coalgate was struck by an F4 tornado. The Westward school building and over 200 homes were destroyed. At least 11 people were killed.

The city prospered until the 1920s, when the coal mines closed because of worker strikes. Since this time agriculture and manufacturing have become the leading industries. From 1921 to 1923, local cotton crops were destroyed by a boll weevil infestation, and all five banks in the county closed. Coalgate's population peaked at 3,009 at the 1920 census and has never recovered.

Coalgate survived the Great Depression, although many of its businesses did not. After President Franklin D. Roosevelt's election, various Federal programs, such as the Civilian Conservation Corps (CCC), National Youth Administration (NYA), and Works Progress Administration (WPA), helped buoy the city's struggling economy. The onset of World War II brought a temporary respite to the coal industry. However, these mines closed by 1958.

== Geography ==
According to the United States Census Bureau, the city has a total area of 1.6 square miles (4.1 km^{2}), of which 1.5 square miles (3.9 km^{2}) is land and 0.04 square miles (0.10 km^{2}) (1.27%) is water.

== Demographics ==
Historical population
Census	Pop.	Note	%±
1900	2,614		—
1910	3,255		24.5%
1920	3,009		−7.6%
1930	2,064		−31.4%
1940	2,118		2.6%
1950	1,984		−6.3%
1960	1,689		−14.9%
1970	1,859		10.1%
1980	2,001		7.6%
1990	1,895		−5.3%
2000	2,005		5.8%
2010	1,967		−1.9%
2020	1,667		−15.3%
U.S. Decennial Census

=== 2020 census ===
As of the 2020 census, Coalgate had a population of 1,667. The median age was 40.6 years. 23.3% of residents were under the age of 18 and 20.4% of residents were 65 years of age or older. For every 100 females there were 82.4 males, and for every 100 females age 18 and over there were 77.1 males age 18 and over.

All residents lived in rural areas.

There were 708 households in Coalgate, of which 28.8% had children under the age of 18 living in them. Of all households, 34.0% were married-couple households, 20.2% were households with a male householder and no spouse or partner present, and 39.3% were households with a female householder and no spouse or partner present. About 37.6% of all households were made up of individuals and 16.4% had someone living alone who was 65 years of age or older.

There were 900 housing units, of which 21.3% were vacant. Among occupied housing units, 53.2% were owner-occupied and 46.8% were renter-occupied. The homeowner vacancy rate was 1.2% and the rental vacancy rate was 22.5%.

Racial composition as of the 2020 census
Race	Percent
White	62.3%
Black or African American	1.2%
American Indian and Alaska Native	22.4%
Asian	0.4%
Native Hawaiian and Other Pacific Islander	<0.1%
Some other race	1.9%
Two or more races	11.9%
Hispanic or Latino (of any race)	6.0%

=== 2000 census ===
As of the census of 2000, there were 2,005 people, 830 households, and 498 families residing in the city. The population density was 1,301.3 inhabitants per square mile (502.4/km^{2}). There were 947 housing units at an average density of 614.6 units per square mile (237.3 units/km^{2}). The racial makeup of the city was 74.26% White, 0.80% African American, 16.26% Native American, 0.50% Asian, 1.25% from other races, and 6.93% from two or more races. Hispanic or Latino of any race were 2.89% of the population.

There were 25 households, out of which 28.4% had children under the age of 18 living with them, 44.0% were married couples living together, 13.4% had a female householder with no husband present, and 39.9% were non-families. 37.3% of all households were made up of individuals, and 20.7% had someone living alone who was 65 years of age or older. The average household size was 2.32 and the average family size was 3.07.

In the city, the population was spread out, with 26.2% under the age of 18, 7.0% from 18 to 24, 25.6% from 25 to 44, 19.0% from 45 to 64, and 22.1% who were 65 years of age or older. The median age was 38 years. For every 100 females, there were 84.1 males. For every 100 females age 18 and over, there were 79.7 males.

The median income for a household in the city was $19,419, and the median income for a family was $26,367. Males had a median income of $23,438 versus $16,429 for females. The per capita income for the city was $10,572. About 21.7% of families and 28.6% of the population were below the poverty line, including 33.5% of those under age 18 and 22.6% of those age 65 or over.

== Transportation ==
There are four main highways that run through Coalgate. There is U.S. Route 75 running a concurrently with Oklahoma State Highway 3, going north–south. Oklahoma State Highway 43 runs east out of Coalgate after a T-intersection with U.S. 75/State 3. Oklahoma State Highway 31 also passes through northern Coalgate, in a northeast–southwest direction.

== Notable people ==
- Josh Brecheen (1979–present), Choctaw citizen and U.S. representative for Oklahoma's 2nd congressional district since 2023.
- Percy Lee Gassaway (1885–1937), American politician and a U.S. Representative from Oklahoma, born in Waco, TX, Sponsored a birth control education bill in 1936.
- Patrick J. Hurley (1883–1963), American general, Secretary of War, and diplomat, was raised near Coalgate.
