= Harriet Wright O'Leary =

American teacher and Choctaw politician

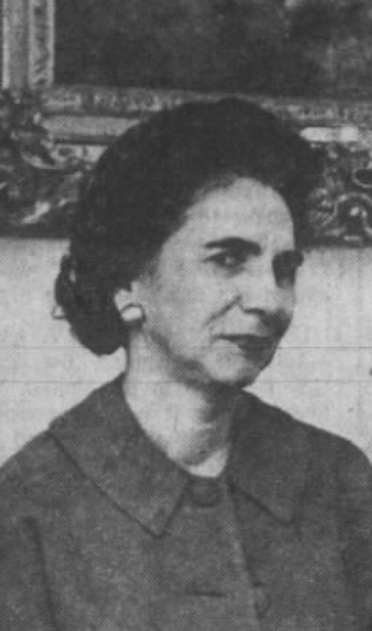
- O'Leary, 1963

Member of the Choctaw Tribal Council for District 11
- In office September 4, 1979 – September 4, 1983
- Preceded by: Position established
- Succeeded by: William J. Frye

Personal details
- Born: Harriet Allea Wright; December 7, 1916 Wapanucka, Oklahoma, U.S.
- Died: December 22, 1999 (aged 83) McAlester, Oklahoma, U.S.
- Relatives: Allen Wright (grandfather); Anna Wright (aunt); Muriel Wright (cousin)
- Occupation: Teacher, politician

Harriet Wright O'Leary (December 7, 1916 – December 22, 1999) was an American teacher and politician. She was the first woman to serve on the tribal council of the Choctaw Nation of Oklahoma and the first woman to vie for the position as Principal Chief.

== Early life and education ==
Harriet Allea Wright was born on December 7, 1916, in Wapanucka, Johnston County, Oklahoma, to Bessie (née Hancock) and James Brookes "J.B." Wright. Her family was descended from Harriet (née Mitchell), a missionary from Ohio and Allen Wright, who served as Principal Chief of the Choctaw Republic from 1866 to 1870. Harriet Mitchell's ancestry included Mayflower passengers William Brewster and Edward Doty. Wright was the niece of Eliphalet Nott Wright and a cousin of his daughter, the Oklahoma historian, Muriel Wright. Her father served for many years as an Indian agent for the Bureau of Indian Affairs. Wright graduated from McAlester High School and studied at Hershey's Commercial School before attending the Oklahoma College for Women (now the University of Science and Arts of Oklahoma) in Chickasha.

== Career ==
After graduating from the Oklahoma College for Women, Wright worked as a stenographer at the Indian Hospital in Talihina, Oklahoma. On April 19, 1941, she married Charles J. O'Leary, a native of Chickasha, Oklahoma, in Tyler, Texas. While Charles completed his military service in World War II, O'Leary lived with her parents, where their first son was born in 1943. Upon completion of the war, Charles went to work for Halliburton Oil Company, and the family moved to Whittier, California, where two more sons were born in 1947 and 1948. Charles was transferred to the Duncan, Oklahoma Halliburton office and the family returned to Oklahoma, but he died in 1950.

== Education (1950–1967) ==
When Charles died, O'Leary and her sons, Charles, James, and John returned to McAlester and she taught fourth grade at Emerson School while taking graduate courses at the University of Oklahoma. She joined the local chapter of the American Association of University Women in 1951, became its vice president in 1953, and then served as president until 1958. In 1956, she completed her master's degree in education. The O'Leary family and other relatives attended the American Indian Exposition's dedication in September 1958, of a statue in the American Indian Hall of Fame for her grandfather, Allen Wright. Immediately after, she and her children moved to Springfield, Missouri, where O'Leary had been hired to teach at Southwest Missouri State College (now Missouri State University).

While living in Springfield, O'Leary became the governor of the local chapter of the Mayflower Society, serving until 1963, when the family relocated to Kansas City, Missouri. That year she took a position as a language arts consultant to the American Book Company. She organized reading workshops for the company urging educators to use phonics. O'Leary retired in 1967 and returned to McAlester.

== Politics and later life (1970–1990) ==
In 1970, the United States Congress repealed the Choctaw Termination Act. After lobbying from the then-chief Hollis E. Roberts, the tribe approved a constitution in 1979, which for the first time since statehood, created a tribal council. Because no one had filed to represent her district on the council, O'Leary drove seventy-five miles on the last day of filing to register as a candidate for District 11. She ran under the name of Harriet James, and became the first woman elected to the Choctaw Nation Tribal Council, serving from 1979 to 1983. At the first meeting of the council, she was not surprised that a man was elected speaker and she was elected secretary, nor that her first two resolutions were rejected. O'Leary said that during her term of office, she overcame the sexism of those who thought women should not be in politics and was able to introduce resolutions that passed.

At the end of her term, O'Leary ran unsuccessfully against the incumbent Hollis Roberts (DRP) and four other male candidates for the office of Principal Chief. Her campaign marked the first time a woman had vied for the office and prompted Marycrest College in Davenport, Iowa to grant her an honorary doctorate. In the 1980s, she served as the regent of the Kilihoto chapter of the Daughters of the American Revolution of McAlester and as the Oklahoma state governor of the Mayflower Society. In the 1990s, she married Patrick Harold Mackey, a fellow Choctaw and retired civil servant and war veteran.

== Death and legacy ==
O'Leary died on December 22, 1999, in McAlester, and was buried in Boggy Depot Cemetery, in Atoka County, Oklahoma. She is remembered for her pioneering role on the Choctaw Tribal Council.

== See also ==
- Native American women in politics
