= Allen Wright =

Nineteenth century Choctaw chief

The Reverend Allen Wright
- Kiliahote
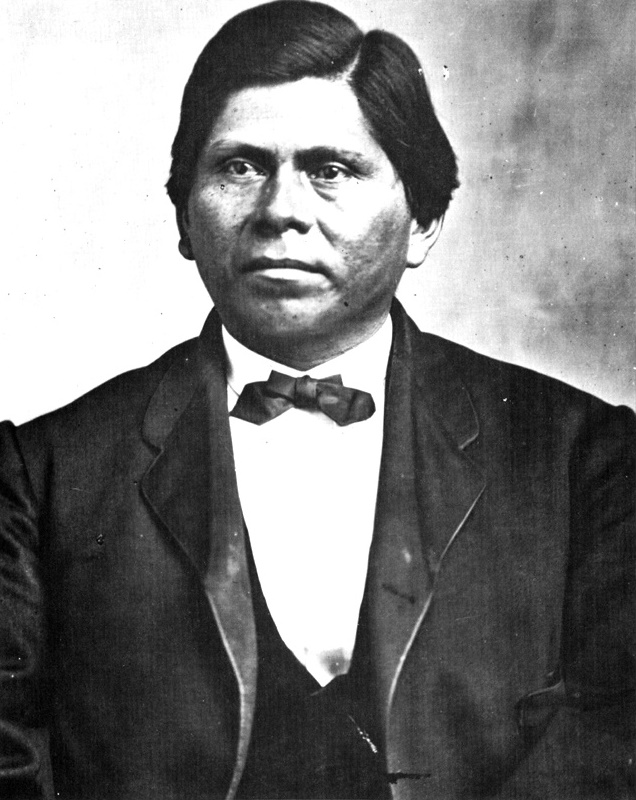

Chief of the Choctaw Nation
- In office 1866–1870
- Preceded by: Peter Pitchlynn
- Succeeded by: William Bryant

Member of the Choctaw National Council from the Pushmataha District
- In office 1856–1861
- Constituency: Hitoka Kaunti

Choctaw National Treasurer
- In office 1859–1861

Personal details
- Born: Kiliahote; November 1826 Attala County, Mississippi
- Died: December 2, 1885 (aged 59) Boggy Depot, Indian Territory
- Party: Progressive Party
- Occupation: Minister, warrior, politician
- Known for: Creation of the name "Oklahoma."

Military service
- Allegiance: Choctaw Nation; Confederate States
- Branch/service: Confederate army: Company of Choctaw infantry (1862–63); Company F, Choctaw and Chickasaw Mounted Rifles (1863–65)
- Years of service: 1861–1865
- Rank: Chaplain

Allen Wright (Choctaw: Kiliahote) (born November 1826 – December 2, 1885) was Principal Chief of the Choctaw Republic from late 1866 to 1870. He had been ordained as a Presbyterian minister in 1852 after graduating from Union Theological Seminary in New York City. He was very active in the Choctaw government, holding several elected positions. He has been credited with the name Oklahoma (Choctaw word meaning "Home of the Red Man" in English) for the land that would become the state.

After serving in the Confederate Army during the Civil War, Wright was elected as Principal Chief, serving from 1866 to 1870. He was among the signatories of the Reconstruction Treaty of 1866 to re-establish peace with the United States. Wright served as superintendent of schools for the Choctaw Nation from 1880 to 1884.

== Early life ==
Allen Wright was born Kiliahote ("Come, let's make a light") in Attala County, Mississippi, in November 1826, at that time still a part of the Choctaw Nation. His father was Ishtemahilvbi, and his mother a full-blood Choctaw who died in June 1832. The father and surviving members of the family left Mississippi in October 1833 and settled in what is now McCurtain County, Oklahoma, in March 1834, during the period of forced Indian Removal by the federal government from the Southeast.

According to a biography published by the Chronicles of Oklahoma, Kiliahote's father died in 1839. The youth was taken in by Reverend Cyrus Kingsbury near Doaksville, and attended a mission school at Pine Ridge. He was given his English name, Allen Wright, by the Presbyterian missionaries. The surname honored Reverend Alfred Wright, a noted Presbyterian missionary to the Choctaw.

After four years, Wright entered Spencer Academy, the main Choctaw tribal school, where he studied from 1844 to 1848.

Kiliahote was raised in Choctaw traditions. He had begun to learn about Christianity from missionary teachers, especially Presbyterians. In April 1846, at the age of 20, he joined the Presbyterian Church. He began later to consider a career in the ministry and ultimately went to seminary.

Wright was one of four students chosen by the Choctaw Council to attend college in an eastern state of the United States. Wright attended Delaware College in Newark, Delaware, from 1848 to 1850; that year the school closed. He enrolled at Union College in Schenectady, New York, where he earned a Bachelor of Arts in July 1852 and joined a fraternity.

In September 1852 Wright entered Union Theological Seminary in New York City. He earned a Master of Arts degree in Theology in May 1855. He was the first Native American student from Indian Territory to earn this degree. After graduation from the seminary, he was ordained as a minister by the Presbyterian Church.

He returned to the Choctaw Nation and became the principal instructor at Armstrong Academy during the 1855–1856 school term. This was a school for Choctaw boys in Chahta Tamaha, operated by Presbyterian missionaries.

== Marriage and family ==
On February 11, 1857, Wright married Harriet Newell Mitchell, a European-American woman from Ohio whom he met at the Choctaw Nation. Born August 16, 1834, in Dayton, Ohio, she had been sent by the Presbyterian Board of Missions to the Choctaw Nation in 1855 to serve as a missionary. The couple had eight children together:

- Eliphalet N. Wright, father of historian Muriel Hazel Wright
- Frank Hall Wright
- Mary Wallace
- Anna Ludlow
- Allen Wright
- Hattie Wright
- Clara Eddy Richards
- Katherine Morris
- James Brookes Wright

One of their sons, Eliphalet Nott Wright (1858–1932), became a medical doctor and later also served as president of the Choctaw Oil Company. One of their granddaughters was Muriel Hazel Wright, who became a noted Oklahoma author and historian and another was Harriet Wright O'Leary, who was the first woman elected to serve on the Choctaw Tribal Council.

== Political career and service during the Civil War ==
Wright became a member of the Choctaw Council in 1856. He was elected treasurer of the Choctaw Nation in 1859, and a member of the Choctaw Council in 1861. According to the Encyclopedia of Oklahoma History and Culture, he was elected to two terms in the Choctaw House of Representatives and to three terms as treasurer of the Choctaw Nation.

Wright was among the signatories to the 1861 treaty that allied the Choctaw Nation with the Confederate States of America. The Choctaw and some of the other Southeast tribes believed the Confederacy's promise of establishing a Native American state if they won the war. Subsequently, Wright joined the Confederate Army.

Wright joined Captain Wilkin's Company of Choctaw infantry on July 25, 1862. He was transferred to Company F of the Choctaw and Chickasaw Mounted Rifles on June 13, 1863. When the war ended, Choctaw Chief Peter Pitchlynn sent him as a delegate to the Fort Smith conference, where an armistice was signed with the United States.

== Post-Civil War ==
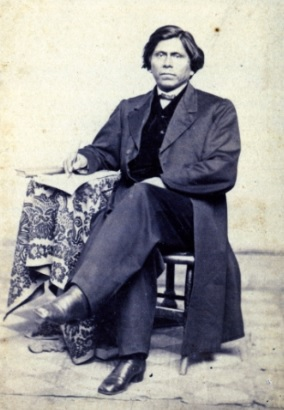
Wright led the Choctaw delegation to Washington, D.C. in 1866 to negotiate a new treaty. He advocated for reconciliation between his people and the Union.

Wright was elected Principal Chief of the Choctaw Tribe in 1866, and served until 1870. Some of his major accomplishments were based on his extensive education and included:

- Translating laws of the Chickasaw Nation from English into Chickasaw
- Compiling a Choctaw dictionary for use in tribal schools
- Translating the Book of Psalms (from the Bible) from Hebrew into Choctaw

Wright was a polyglot, speaking in addition to his native Choctaw English, Greek, Latin, and Hebrew.

Wright represented the Choctaw Nation at the Fort Smith Council and signed the Reconstruction Treaty of 1866. When the Federal commissioners proposed to consolidate all of the Indian Territories tribes under an intertribal council, he suggested the term Oklahoma as the name for the Territory.

In 1885, Wright served as editor and translator of the Indian Champion. He was a charter member of the first Masonic lodge in Indian Territory, present-day Oklahoma. He was also a member of the Royal Arch Masons in Maryland, which he had joined in 1866.

Wright served as superintendent of schools for the Choctaw Nation from 1880 to 1884.

Wright died in Boggy Depot, Indian Territory on December 2, 1885. He had been riding a circuit to evangelize the Gospel. After having to swim across a river to continue his journey, he contracted pneumonia. He was buried in the Boggy Depot cemetery. His widow Harriet died December 25, 1894, in the town of Atoka. She was buried next to him in Boggy Depot.
