= Chahta Tamaha, Indian Territory =

- Armstrong Academy Site
- U.S. National Register of Historic Places
- Location within Oklahoma Location within the United States
- Location: Bryan County, Oklahoma
- Nearest city: Bokchito, Oklahoma
- Coordinates: 34°3′1″N 96°11′59″W
- Built: 1845
- NRHP reference No.: 72001056
- Added to NRHP: April 13, 1972

Chahta Tamaha (Choctaw Town) served as the capital of the Choctaw Nation from 1863 to 1883 in Indian Territory. The town developed initially around the Armstrong Academy, which was operated by Protestant religious missionaries from 1844 to 1861 to serve Choctaw boys. After the capital was relocated to another town, this community declined.

The townsite is located in present-day Bryan County, Oklahoma. In the mid-19th century it had commercial presence. It included a trading post and church. Although the capital had moved, Armstrong Academy was reopened in 1883 to serve only orphaned boys. It was not rebuilt after being destroyed by fire in 1921. Today nothing is left of the town or the Academy. The Armstrong Academy Site is listed on the National Register of Historic Places.

== History ==
=== Founding until the Civil War ===
Armstrong Academy was founded as a school for Choctaw boys in 1844 and was located within the Nation's Pushmataha District. It was named after William Armstrong, a popular US Indian agent to the Choctaw. The site was selected because it had a fresh water spring with enough current to run a gristmill. A large wood supply was also available.

The first classroom buildings and dormitories were built of logs from the area. In the late 1850s a brick building replaced the log building. A two-story brick addition was added later. A trading post, blacksmith and church were established early on, which stimulated development of the community.

The school had average attendance of about 65 students, but in 1859 it had about 100 students.

"The mission was transferred from the American Indian Mission Association to the Domestic Board of Southern Baptist Convention."

The Baptist Missionary Society of Louisville, Kentucky directed activities until 1855. In that year the school was transferred to control of the Cumberland Presbyterian Board of Foreign and Domestic Missions. They directed it until the school closed in 1861 at the outbreak of the Civil War.

Allen Wright (Choctaw), a Presbyterian missionary and later a chief of the Choctaw, served as principal instructor at the academy during 1855–1856.

Armstrong Academy was located in Blue County until 1886. At that time, the area became part of the newly organized Jackson County. Both counties were part of the Choctaw Nation's Pushmataha District, one of three administrative regions they established after removal to Indian Territory.

=== As Choctaw capital/Chahta Tamaha ===
During the Civil War, the academy closed. Part of the building was used by Confederate forces as a hospital. The Choctaw Council, which had allied with the Confederacy, met there in 1863, and the Choctaw capital was transferred to this town during the same year.

The United Nations of Indian Territory delegates (Cherokee, Chickasaw, Creek, Choctaw, Seminole, and Caddo) met there with the Confederacy to plan war strategy. The Confederates had promised these tribes to support a state for Native Americans if they won the war.

Commercial activities in the town and region increased during that time.

=== Post-war years and relocation of the Capital ===
Chahta Tamaha remained the capital of the Choctaw Nation until 1883, when the capital was relocated to Tuskahoma.

In that same year the Armstrong Academy was reopened as a school. Admission was limited to orphaned boys.

The Armstrong Academy was destroyed by fire in February 1921. The Federal government refused to rebuild it, since the town population had declined markedly after the relocation of the Choctaw nation's capital. The area reverted to its original state and appears as a deserted pasture. Nothing remains of the town but rubble from the Armstrong Academy. The Armstrong Academy Cemetery is visible.

== Sources ==
- Wright, Muriel H. "Historic Spots in the Vicinity of Tuskahoma". Chronicles of Oklahoma 9:1 (March 1931) 27-42. (accessed February 8, 2007)
- Wright, Muriel H., George H. Shirk, Kenny A. Franks. Mark of Heritage. Oklahoma City: Oklahoma Historical Society, 1976.

== See also ==
- Armstrong Academy Cemetery
