= Caddo, Oklahoma =

Town in Oklahoma, US

- Town
- Motto: "...The antique town on a buffalo trail"
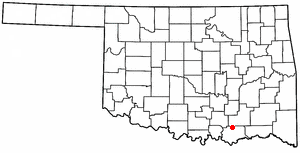
- Location of Caddo, Oklahoma
- Coordinates: 34°07′32″N 96°15′49″W
- Country: United States
- State: Oklahoma
- County: Bryan

Area
  - Total: 1.69 sq mi (4.38 km^{2})
  - Land: 1.69 sq mi (4.38 km^{2})
  - Water: 0 sq mi (0.00 km^{2})
- Elevation: 722 ft (220 m)

Population (2020)
  - Total: 1,017
  - Density: 600.9/sq mi (232.02/km^{2})
- Time zone: UTC-6 (Central (CST))
  - Summer (DST): UTC-5 (CDT)
- ZIP code: 74729
- Area code: 580
- FIPS code: 40-10800
- GNIS feature ID: 2413147

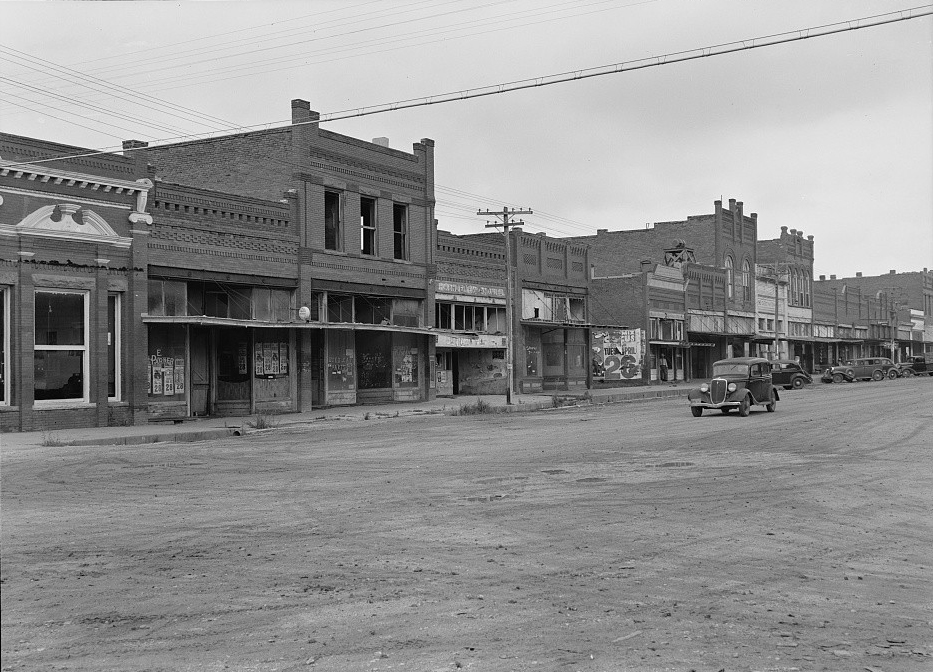
Caddo, Oklahoma in 1938 during The Great Depression as captured by Dorothea Lange.

Caddo is a town in Bryan County, Oklahoma, United States. As of the 2020 census, Caddo had a population of 1,017. The name is derived from a Caddo word, ka do hada’ cho, meaning "real chief" in English. According to Encyclopedia of Oklahoma History and Culture, the town was named for the nearby Caddo Hills.

== History ==
The early inhabitants were Caddos and Choctaws, at least in the early 19th Century. A local legend says that the Caddos and the Choctaws had a fierce battle in 1840, about 2 miles (3.2 km) southeast of the site of present-day Caddo, The Choctaws won the battle, driving off the Caddos.

After a patent for the land, located on a buffalo trail, was obtained in 1872, the first settlers lived in tents.

In 1872, the Missouri-Kansas-Texas Railroad (Katy) built a line through the Choctaw Nation and established a station at Caddo. A post office was opened December 18, 1872, and the railroad reached Denison, Texas by Christmas Day. In 1873, the town population was about four hundred people. Caddo quickly became a shipping and trade center for the surrounding area. By 1890, Caddo had five cotton gins and a population of 2,170. Caddo incorporated as a city in 1898. It was then the most populous town in the region.

At the time of its founding Caddo was located in Blue County, a part of the Pushmataha District of the Choctaw Nation.

Caddo was on the route of the Jefferson Highway established in 1915, with that road running more than 2,300 miles from Winnipeg, Manitoba to New Orleans, Louisiana.

When the St. Louis and San Francisco Railway (Frisco) planned to build an east–west line through the area, land prices jumped up. Frisco officials decided to build their line through Durant instead of Caddo. Durant then became the fastest-growing town, and became the county seat when Bryan County was formed at statehood. By 1930, Caddo's population had fallen to 933. (Note: Caddo's own town history says that the decline began in 1885, when the Fort Worth & Denver Railroad reached Henrietta, Texas, which became the major trading and freighting station in the area.)

In 1943, Guy A. Crossett, the editor of The Caddo Herald newspaper described Caddo's decline. “Caddo was a thriving town when Durant was a switch; when Hugo was a prairie; when Madill was unborn; when Coalgate was un-thought-of; when Ardmore was only in Pennsylvania; when Idabel was yet to be; when Atoka was a small village. Yet all have outgrown us. The reason is plain. We did not elect a delegate to Bill Murray’s famous Constitutional Convention; and tried to live upon the glories of the past. Finding out too late that we could not run the mill with water that has passed. Yet Caddo’s part in the history of the state is honorable. That is secure. The future is another thing.”

== Geography ==
According to the United States Census Bureau, Caddo has a total area of 2.1 square miles (5.4 km^{2}), all land.

== Demographics ==
Historical population
Census	Pop.	Note	%±
1900	930		—
1910	1,143		22.9%
1920	1,421		24.3%
1930	933		−34.3%
1940	954		2.3%
1950	895		−6.2%
1960	814		−9.1%
1970	886		8.8%
1980	923		4.2%
1990	918		−0.5%
2000	944		2.8%
2010	997		5.6%
2020	1,017		2.0%
U.S. Decennial Census

=== 2020 census ===
As of the 2020 census, Caddo had a population of 1,017. The median age was 36.8 years. 25.4% of residents were under the age of 18 and 18.4% of residents were 65 years of age or older. For every 100 females there were 94.8 males, and for every 100 females age 18 and over there were 85.6 males age 18 and over.

0.0% of residents lived in urban areas, while 100.0% lived in rural areas.

There were 414 households in Caddo, of which 31.6% had children under the age of 18 living in them. Of all households, 40.3% were married-couple households, 18.6% were households with a male householder and no spouse or partner present, and 32.9% were households with a female householder and no spouse or partner present. About 29.7% of all households were made up of individuals and 15.3% had someone living alone who was 65 years of age or older.

There were 480 housing units, of which 13.8% were vacant. The homeowner vacancy rate was 0.4% and the rental vacancy rate was 4.4%.

Racial composition as of the 2020 census
Race	Number	Percent
White	732	72.0%
Black or African American	2	0.2%
American Indian and Alaska Native	167	16.4%
Asian	5	0.5%
Native Hawaiian and Other Pacific Islander	0	0.0%
Some other race	19	1.9%
Two or more races	92	9.0%
Hispanic or Latino (of any race)	49	4.8%

=== 2000 census ===
As of the census of 2000, there were 944 people, 387 households, and 255 families residing in the town. The population density was 449.0 inhabitants per square mile (173.4/km^{2}). There were 443 housing units at an average density of 210.7 per square mile (81.4/km^{2}). The racial makeup of the town was 77.97% White, 0.64% African American, 13.67% Native American, 0.21% Asian, 0.32% from other races, and 7.20% from two or more races. Hispanic or Latino of any race were 1.59% of the population.

There were 387 households, out of which 29.2% had children under the age of 18 living with them, 51.9% were married couples living together, 9.8% had a female householder with no husband present, and 34.1% were non-families. 32.3% of all households were made up of individuals, and 16.0% had someone living alone who was 65 years of age or older. The average household size was 2.34 and the average family size was 2.98.

In the town, the population was spread out, with 24.4% under the age of 18, 7.6% from 18 to 24, 24.2% from 25 to 44, 21.1% from 45 to 64, and 22.8% who were 65 years of age or older. The median age was 40 years. For every 100 females, there were 91.5 males. For every 100 females age 18 and over, there were 83.5 males.

The median income for a household in the town was $26,250, and the median income for a family was $34,643. Males had a median income of $27,731 versus $18,846 for females. The per capita income for the town was $12,890. About 14.2% of families and 21.1% of the population were below the poverty line, including 30.8% of those under age 18 and 25.1% of those age 65 or over.

== Culture and recreation ==
Caddo holds its Heritage Day Festival on the first Saturday in October every year.

== Notable people ==
- Gail Farrell (singer, songwriter, pianist), grew up in Caddo and nearby Durant, Oklahoma.
- Lydia Starr McPherson (1827–1903), founder of an early Caddo newspaper, the Caddo International News
- Gary Richardson, born in Caddo, former United States attorney
- Cowboy Pink Williams (1892-1976), 7th lieutenant governor of Oklahoma
