= Goodland Academy =

Location
- Hugo, Oklahoma; U.S. 33.980520°N 95.558416°W

Information
- Type: Private, K-12
- Established: 1848
- Director: David L. Dearinger
- Faculty: 18
- Enrollment: 38
- Campus: 390 acres
- Mascot: Red Hawks
- Accreditation: National Association of Private Schools
- Website: www.goodland.org

Goodland Academy is a boarding school located in Choctaw County, Oklahoma, 3 miles (4.8 km) southwest of Hugo in southeastern Oklahoma, U.S.. Founded in 1848 as a Presbyterian mission, it is the oldest private boarding school in Oklahoma still in operation.

== History ==
Two Presbyterian ministers, Rev. Ebenezer Hotchkin and Rev. Cyrus Kingsbury, established the Yakni Achukma (Choctaw for "Good Land") mission station in 1835, in southeastern Indian Territory (now the state of Oklahoma). (Note: This site was known as "Good Land" until the Civil War. In 1860, O. P. Stark wrote a report to the U. S. Commissioner of Indian Affairs, in which he wrote the name as "Goodland." The facility has used the one-word form ever since.) In 1838, William Fields, a full-blood Choctaw, built the first house on the Goodland property, soon to be followed by other Choctaw homes.

In 1848, the American Board of Commissioners for Foreign Missions (ABCFM), a Presbyterian and Congregational organization, recognized the need for a permanent missionary to Good Land and sent Rev. and Mrs. John Lathrop to this mission station. John Lathrop built the first structure, a two-room log manse, where he and his wife lived and ministered to the Choctaws living in the surrounding community. After two years of service, the Lathrops requested reassignment and returned to their former home. Few records have been found of their year of ministry at the Good Land Mission.

In the fall of 1850, Rev. and Mrs. Oliver Porter Stark were appointed by the same mission board to continue the mission work. Prior to accepting the appointment to Good Land Mission, Mr. Stark was superintendent of Old Spencer Academy for Indians. The Starks made their home in the manse built by John Lathrop. Margaret Stark wasted no time in starting to teach the Indian children in the area how to read and write. The first "school" met in a side room of the manse.

In 1852, Oliver Porter Stark — with help from Henry L. Gooding and other Choctaw neighbors — built the structure that served the community as both church and school for 42 years. Although moved several feet from the original location in 1894, the same church, renovated many times and enlarged, stands on the Goodland campus today. The original church bell given by Rev. John P. Turnbull is a constant reminder of the work accomplished by these early pioneers with meager resources. Stark also dug the first well, which was still being used in 1932 when it was sealed and covered by the present concrete steps of the old Goodland High School.

Goodland school originated as a primary day school, and because children were often needed to help in the fields, average attendance for the first few years was about twenty. From the beginning, the Indian families in the area were interested in the school. Many families moved close by in order that their children might attend and in order that the old and young might worship there. The local church members opened their doors to orphan children in order for them to attend the school. The church and school grew together.

=== Impact of the Civil War ===
During the Civil War, two Choctaw Indian regiments pitched their tents on the campus around the well that Rev. Stark dug. Stark wrote to the mission board to report on the bands of robbers and lawlessness that existed in the area at the time. He requested reassignment and was transferred to Paris, Texas, in 1866, where he helped to establish a girls' boarding school and the First Presbyterian Church. This left the Goodland Mission church without an assigned pastor, but the seeds the former missionaries had planted were strong enough to endure the period of turmoil.

=== Post Civil War ===
After the Civil War, the division within the Presbyterian Church continued to leave the mission without pastor, teacher or mission board to guide or encourage the work. Apparently, each "side", North and South, assumed that the other would pick up the mission. During this period, Indian families and their white friends in the area continued the work begun by the missionaries. Rev. John P. Turnbull, an Indian Presbyterian minister, operated the church and school until 1890 when Joseph P. Gibbons was assigned to the Goodland Mission. Finally, in 1894, the Goodland Mission became a special responsibility of the Presbyterian Church, US, General Assembly's Executive Committee of Home Missions.

In 1894, the church was repaired and the first dormitory was built for what eventually became the Goodland Indian Orphanage. During the preceding years, Christian families of the Goodland community had begun to take orphans into their homes in order that they might attend the Goodland school. The dormitory was built from hand-hewn logs to house sixteen Indian boys on Goodland Mission property. It was a crude building — one large room with a sleeping loft overhead and a kitchen/dining room added on one side. A large front porch provided extra living space. Supplies for the orphans were donated from Indian families who lived nearby. Each week one of the church members took a wagon from house to house, receiving liberal contributions of meat, lard, meal, flour, potatoes, sugar, molasses and coal oil for the boys to use.

In 1901, the first superintendent assigned to the school and home was a Choctaw named Silas L. Bacon, who himself had been orphaned as a child and taken in by a family near the mission school. For twenty years Bacon served as superintendent of the school and during his administration four dormitories and a bath house were built. Several Indian families deeded land to the institution during those years, and by 1920 the school owned a total of 75 acres (300,000 m^{2}). Even more important was the impression left on the school by Bacon himself, a humble and deeply religious man.

=== Post statehood ===
The Choctaw Nation was required to close all tribal schools when the tribal government was abolished before Oklahoma became a state in 1907. (Note: Being privately owned and operated, Goodland was exempt from closure, but had to become independent of Federal and tribal funds.) Funds formerly allocated to the tribe for educating children became a responsibility of the state, rather than the Federal government. Financial problems were acute. Both to build needed structures and to feed the children, Silas Bacon had to plead with the Presbyterian Home Mission Committee and with Christian friends of the Home for funds. In a speech at the school, Bacon admitted that, while he could never beg for himself, he did not mind humbling himself to beg on behalf of the children in his care. Concluding his speech he said, "My heart makes me know that God is in this work. We got to do all we can. And I notice no child has starved. None has froze in our school, even if times have been so hard most of the time." Bacon made a lasting impression on the community with his selfless love for children.

In 1921, Bacon succumbed to tuberculosis. He is buried in the Goodland Cemetery near another early pioneer of southeastern Oklahoma — the first governor of the Choctaw Nation, Basil LeFlore. After the death of Bacon, Samuel Bailey Spring was made superintendent of Goodland Indian Orphanage — a position he held until his death on April 17, 1930. He was one-fourth Choctaw and was highly educated. In spite of his advantages, he cared very deeply for young people. When given the choice of Principal Chief of the Choctaws or Superintendent of Goodland Indian Orphanage, he chose the latter. One of his former students once wrote of him, "We always felt free to talk over any question with him. Not once did he turn a child away, saying, "I'm too busy to see you now." And always we left those meetings with our problems solved, with something to work on, some word of encouragement, and some praise."

The 1929 financial crash had serious repercussions in Oklahoma. In Goodland's favor was that it was the only home for Indian orphans maintained by the Presbyterian Church U.S., but it had a debt of over $30,000. The synod, although in a financial pinch of its own, voted to continue the home. The church called Rev. E. D. Miller to supervise the home during this time of crisis. With the help of many friends, he paid the outstanding debt within six years. He repaired and painted the older buildings, fireproofed the roofs, sodded the campus with grass, planted gardens and orchards, and built a poultry flock and a dairy herd. He laid out gravel drives and concrete walks and added a tennis court and football field. Miller jokingly referred to his method of administration as a "Divine-Human Partnership".

Another milestone occurred in 1930, when the Goodland public school consolidated with the Home's own school on campus. Under the New Deal program, the Works Progress Administration (WPA) provided funds to construct new buildings on the campus, including a grade school, a combination gym/auditorium and a hospital. The gym and auditorium became a community center for the neighborhood. From that point, the Goodland Mission was, by all practical means, a boarding home with schooling on campus. Over the years, gifts were especially important to the Goodland Home. In 1934, Daniel Wade, a colorful Choctaw, gave funds to construct an infirmary. As a result, the home acquired a stately stone structure, Wade Hall.

By 1940, the Home owned 763 acres (3.09 km^{2}) of land, 390 of which comprise the campus. Normal wear and tear took their toll of the old dormitories, so smaller and safer cottages were built in the 1960s. During the same period, the original church was restored and dedicated to Stark, leader of the Mission through the 1850s.

== Notable faculty and alumni ==
- Jack Bell, Oklahoma State Senator
- Basil LeFlore, Governor of the Choctaw Nation
- Cyrus Kingsbury, missionary
