= Muriel Wright =

Muriel Wright may refer to:

- Muriel Hazel Wright (1889–1975), American educator and historian
- Muriel Wright, mistress of British author Ian Fleming
