= AQR =

AQR may refer to:

- Atoka Municipal Airport, Oklahoma, US
- AQR Capital Management

Aqr may refer to:

- Aquarius (constellation), abbreviation
- Arhâ, ISO 639-3 language code for a New Caledonian language
