= Mayhew, Indian Territory =

Mayhew, Indian Territory, located two miles north of present-day Boswell, Oklahoma, was the seat of government of the Pushmataha District of the Choctaw Nation, in the Indian Territory. It was located in Jackson County, Choctaw Nation, the county seat of which was Pigeon Roost, south of present-day Boswell.

It ceased its functions upon preparation for Oklahoma’s statehood in 1907, when the Choctaw Nation’s government and political subdivisions were dissolved.

== History ==
Mayhew was founded in 1836 by Presbyterian missionaries to the Choctaw Indians. They named it for Mayhew Presbyterian Mission in Mississippi. From here they ministered to the Choctaws, providing schooling, medical aid, and other services.

A United States Post Office was established at Mayhew, Indian Territory on February 5, 1845 and operated until September 30, 1902. It then moved two miles south to Boswell, which was then a new townsite along the new railroad, and changed its name to Boswell, Indian Territory.

Boswell was named for S.C. Boswell, a local merchant.

Mayhew was visited by a Works Progress Administration field worker in September 1936. At that time she reported the remains of the original site of Mayhew—a half-mile away from its second and last site—were torn down in 1934. The last site of Mayhew still held the steel jailhouse constructed during territorial days to hold the prisoners of the Pushmataha District (Third District) of the Choctaw Nation. The jailhouse was originally located at the first site of the district court, near the present-day Choctaw County community of Sunkist, and was moved to Mayhew in 1903. (The Pushmataha District had abandoned the site of its first courthouse after it burned. Its remote location between the forks of the Clear Boggy Creek and Muddy Boggy Creek caused it to move to Mayhew, the court's last seat before Oklahoma's statehood, rather than rebuild.) In 1936 it was still in excellent condition and being used as a granary. The original "whipping tree", from which the court dispensed punishment to those convicted of crimes, had been chopped down.

Riveting accounts of the life and work of the Mayhew Mission may be read in the surviving papers of Cyrus Kingsbury, a longtime missionary. These comprise the sole written record of this part of southeastern Oklahoma from the 1840s onward. Included are descriptions of the Choctaws, white settlers, and also fairly detailed meteorological observations, the first and only such recorded observations of this area.
