= Zsuzsa Selyem =

Romanian-Hungarian Academic

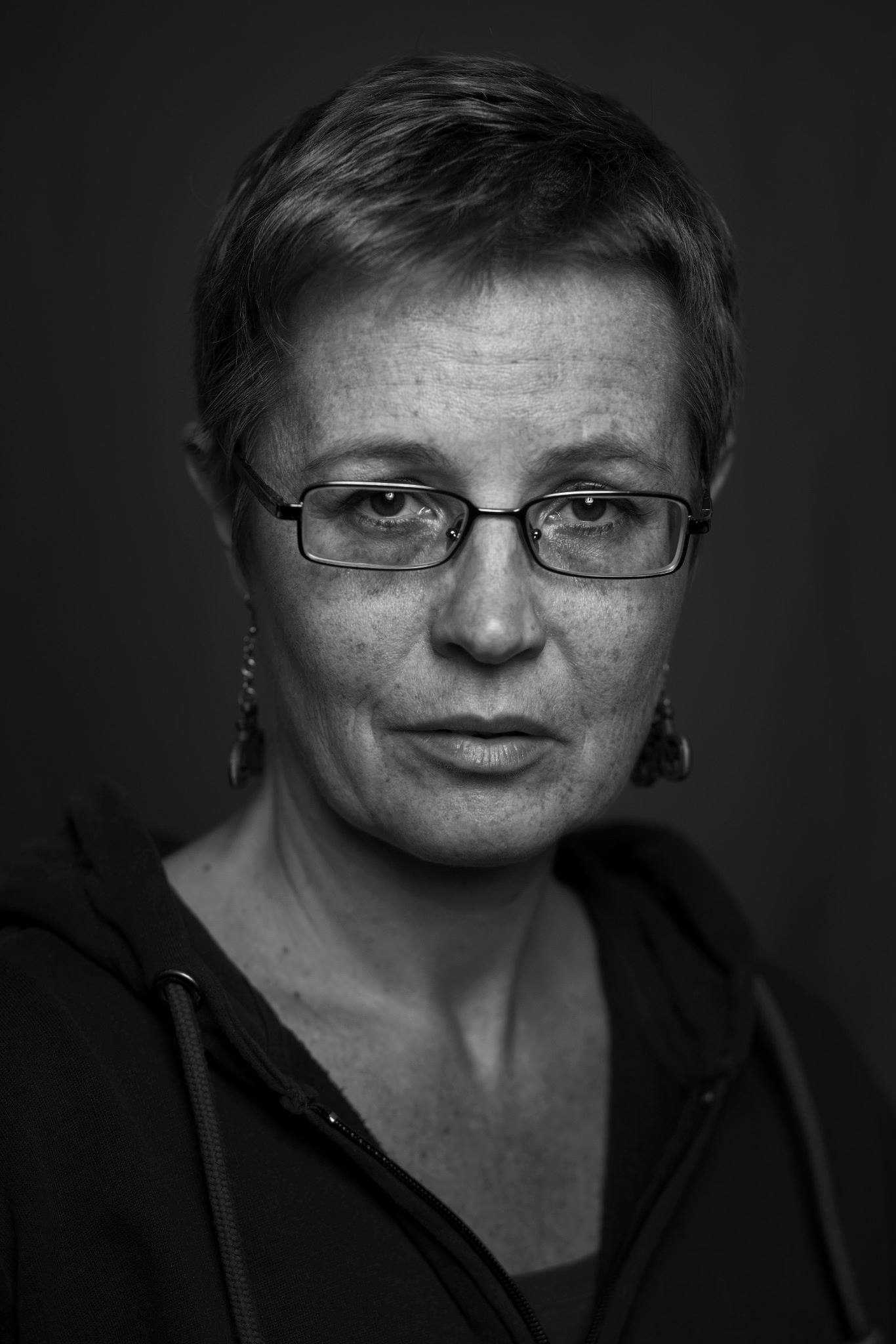
- Born: May 15, 1967 (age 58)
- Awards: Tibor Déry Award
- Website: zsuzsaselyem.ro

Zsuzsa Selyem (Born May 15, 1967; Hungarian name order: Selyem Zsuzsa) is a Romanian-Hungarian novelist, poet, translator and literary historian. She is an associate professor at the Babes-Bolyai University in Cluj, Romania.

== Career ==
Selyem began attending the ELTE Faculty of Humanities in 1997, and graduated with a PhD in Aesthetics in 2003. She previously worked as a journalist and editor for the Hungarian Institute of Literary Studies, before taking an associate professor job at Babes-Bolyai.

She was a guest on the Belső közlés literary program.

== Awards ==
- Aladár Komlós Award (2018)

== Works in English ==
- Selyem, Zsuzsa; Mihálycsa, Erika; Sherwood, P. A. (2020). It's raining in Moscow. New York, NY: Contra Mundum Press. ISBN 978-1-940625-39-3. OCLC 1151896414.

== Works ==
Books
| Name | Year | Type | ISBN | Reviews | Publisher |
|---|---|---|---|---|---|
| Moszkvában esik : egy kitelepítés története (It's Raining in Moscow) | 2020 | Book | ISBN 9789636765910 | | Contra Mundum Press |
| 9 kiló : történet a 119. zsoltárra (9 Kilos) | 2011 | Book | ISBN 9789737605214 | | Hungarian Literature Online |
| Danube 1954 | 2016 | Book | | | World Literature Today |
| Humor az avantgárdban és a posztmodernben (Humor in the Avant-Garde and Postmodernism) | 2004 | Book | ISBN 9789737953131 | | Scientia |

Poems
| Name | Year | Reviews | Publisher |
|---|---|---|---|
| Milyen bájos haver a szomszédunk (What a Charming Dude is our Neighbor) | 2020 | | Hungarian Literature Online |
| A Hold a kemény vízen át: Amerika nem szeret engem (The Moon Through the Hard Water: America doesn't like me) | 2019 | | World Literature Today |
| Az első világvége, amit együtt töltöttünk (The First Apocalypse We Spent Together) | 2020 | | Jelenkor Publishing |
| Mire vársz? (What are you Waiting For?) | 2009 | | Bookart |
| Az a kis napfénycsík (That Little Strip of Sunshine) | 2018 | | Hungarian Literature Online |

Essays
| Name | Year | ISBN |
|---|---|---|
| Himmler trükkje (Himmler's Trick) | 2018 | |
| Fiktív állatok (Fictitious Animals) | 2014 | |
| Erdei politika : publisztikák (Forest Policy) | 2009 | ISBN 9789731650067 |
| Valami helyet (Somewhere) | 2001 | ISBN 9789639136656 |
