= Ebenezer Hotchkin =

American theologian

- Born: 20 March 1803; Richmond, Massachusetts, United States
- Died: 26 October 1867 (aged 64); Lenox, Massachusetts, United States
- Occupation: Theologian
- Spouse: Philena Thatcher
- Children: two sons and three daughters

The Reverend Ebenezer Hotchkin Jr. (20 March 1803 – 26 October 1867) was an American theologian who served as Presbyterian missionary to Native Americans in the 19th century.

== Early life and education ==
Ebenezer Hotchkin Jr. was born on 20 Mar 1803 in Richmond, Massachusetts, United States.

He became fluent in the Choctaw language and used his knowledge of the Choctaw language for missionary work among the native Americans. He took the Native American name Lapish Hanta which meant Peace Trumpet.

== Career ==
He applied to the Presbytery of Tombigbee for licensure to preach in 1830, and after completing the requirements of Presbytery, was duly licensed to become a theologian, preacher and priest at Columbus, Mississippi, United States in 1832.

Along with his contemporary Cyrus Kingsbury, he established several boarding schools for the education of native Americans. The most notable among these schools was the Yakni Achukma Mission station which grew into the Goodland Academy.

He served as the president of the Oklahoma Presbyterian College. Under his mentorship and guidance, the college started offering standardized courses and grew to an enrollment of 315 students.

He was sent as an assistant missionary to the Choctaw Nation in 1828, and spent the rest of his life working as a Christian missionary among them. He took the Choctaw name of Lapish Hanta (meaning Peace Trumpet in Choctaw).

== Personal life ==
He married Philena Thatcher, who was born in 1803 in Hartford, Pennsylvania. She died in November 1867 near Goodwater Mission, a few weeks after her husband. He had two sons and three daughters with her. He son Charles Hotchkin was also licensed to preach and was ordained as a minister on 09 June 1884.

Ebenezer Hotchkin died on 26 October 1867 (aged 64) in Lenox, Massachusetts, United States.
