= Boswell, Oklahoma =

Town in Oklahoma, US

- Town
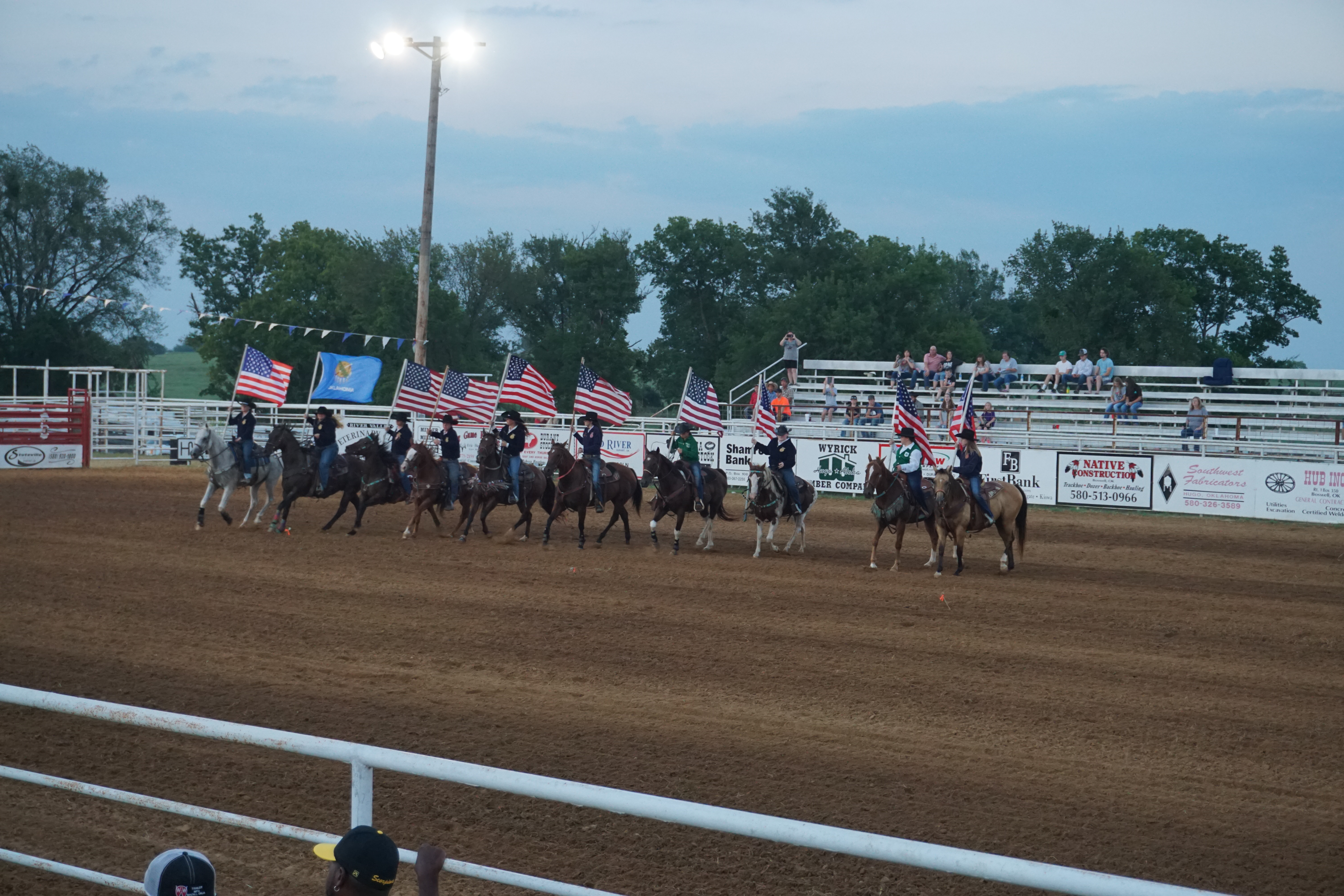
- Grand entry at the 2018 Boswell FFA Rodeo

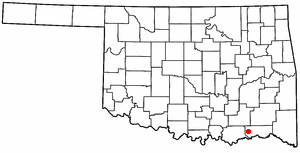
- Location of Boswell, Oklahoma
- Coordinates: 34°01′39″N 95°52′09″W
- Country: United States
- State: Oklahoma
- County: Choctaw

Area
  - Total: 0.77 sq mi (1.99 km^{2})
  - Land: 0.76 sq mi (1.96 km^{2})
  - Water: 0.012 sq mi (0.03 km^{2})
- Elevation: 607 ft (185 m)

Population (2020)
  - Total: 579
  - Density: 764.5/sq mi (295.16/km^{2})
- Time zone: UTC-6 (Central (CST))
  - Summer (DST): UTC-5 (CDT)
- ZIP code: 74727
- Area code: 580
- FIPS code: 40-07750
- GNIS feature ID: 2411710

Boswell is a town in Choctaw County, Oklahoma, United States. As of the 2020 census, Boswell had a population of 579.

== History ==
The Boswell area was one of the Choctaw Nation's first and most important settlements. A Presbyterian missionary station was founded at Mayhew, Indian Territory, three miles north of present-day Boswell in the 1840s. It soon became a government center as well as seat of civilization. Mayhew became the administrative and judicial capital of the Pushmataha District, one of three administrative super-regions comprising the Choctaw Nation.

Mayhew was located in Blue County, one of the counties comprising the Pushmataha District. In 1886 portions of Blue County, including Mayhew, were joined with parts of adjacent counties to form Jackson County. The new county's seat of government was at Pigeon Roost, south of Boswell.

A United States Post Office was established at Mayhew, Indian Territory on February 5, 1845, and operated until September 30, 1902. It then moved two miles south to Boswell, which was then a new townsite along the new railroad, and changed its name to Boswell.

Boswell was named for S.C. Boswell, a local merchant.

== Geography ==
According to the United States Census Bureau, Boswell has a total area of 0.7 square miles (1.8 km^{2}), of which 0.7 square miles (1.8 km^{2}) is land and 1.43% is water.

The town contains Boswell State Park, an Oklahoma State Park largely occupied by a lake, which has been stocked with channel catfish.

=== Climate ===
Climate data for Boswell, Oklahoma
Month	Jan	Feb	Mar	Apr	May	Jun	Jul	Aug	Sep	Oct	Nov	Dec	Year
Mean daily maximum °F (°C)	52.1 (11.2)	57.0 (13.9)	66.1 (18.9)	74.0 (23.3)	80.7 (27.1)	88.2 (31.2)	93.4 (34.1)	93.5 (34.2)	86.1 (30.1)	76.4 (24.7)	64.7 (18.2)	55.2 (12.9)	74.0 (23.3)
Mean daily minimum °F (°C)	28.7 (−1.8)	33.4 (0.8)	42.2 (5.7)	51.5 (10.8)	59.0 (15.0)	66.6 (19.2)	70.3 (21.3)	69.1 (20.6)	62.9 (17.2)	51.2 (10.7)	41.8 (5.4)	32.4 (0.2)	50.8 (10.4)
Average precipitation inches (mm)	2.0 (51)	3.1 (79)	3.8 (97)	3.9 (99)	5.7 (140)	4.1 (100)	2.5 (64)	2.5 (64)	4.5 (110)	4.2 (110)	3.7 (94)	2.8 (71)	42.7 (1,080)
Source: Weatherbase.com

== Demographics ==
Historical population
Census	Pop.	Note	%±
1910	828		—
1920	1,212		46.4%
1930	934		−22.9%
1940	962		3.0%
1950	875		−9.0%
1960	753		−13.9%
1970	755		0.3%
1980	702		−7.0%
1990	643		−8.4%
2000	703		9.3%
2010	709		0.9%
2020	579		−18.3%
U.S. Decennial Census

=== 2020 census ===
As of the 2020 census, Boswell had a population of 579. The median age was 36.0 years. 27.3% of residents were under the age of 18 and 17.1% of residents were 65 years of age or older. For every 100 females there were 84.4 males, and for every 100 females age 18 and over there were 76.9 males age 18 and over.

0.0% of residents lived in urban areas, while 100.0% lived in rural areas.

There were 251 households in Boswell, of which 31.9% had children under the age of 18 living in them. Of all households, 28.3% were married-couple households, 17.9% were households with a male householder and no spouse or partner present, and 44.6% were households with a female householder and no spouse or partner present. About 33.5% of all households were made up of individuals and 18.7% had someone living alone who was 65 years of age or older.

There were 294 housing units, of which 14.6% were vacant. The homeowner vacancy rate was 2.1% and the rental vacancy rate was 8.9%.

Racial composition as of the 2020 census
Race	Number	Percent
White	303	52.3%
Black or African American	64	11.1%
American Indian and Alaska Native	99	17.1%
Asian	1	0.2%
Native Hawaiian and Other Pacific Islander	0	0.0%
Some other race	12	2.1%
Two or more races	100	17.3%
Hispanic or Latino (of any race)	26	4.5%

=== 2010 census ===
As of the 2010 United States census, there were 709 people, 295 households, and 184 families residing in the town. The population density was 1,013 inhabitants per square mile (391/km^{2}). There were 370 housing units at an average density of X per square mile (X/km^{2}). The racial makeup of the town was 63.33% white, 18.05% Native American, 8.32% African American, 2.68% from other races, and 7.33% from two or more races. Hispanic or Latino individuals were 5.92% of the population in 2010, having more than doubled since 2000.

There were 295 households, out of which 34.6% had children under the age of 18 living with them, 34.9% were married couples living together, 19.3% had a female householder with no husband present, and 37.6% were non-families. A third (34.6%) of households were made up of individuals, and 15.3% had someone living alone who was 65 years of age or older. The average household size was 2.4 and the average family size was 3.04.

In the town, the population was spread out, with 25.8% under the age of 18, 11.2% from 18 to 24, 21.3% from 25 to 44, 25.6% from 45 to 64, and 16.1% who were 65 years of age or older. The median age was 36.6 years. For every 100 females, there were 87.6 males. For every 100 females age 18 and over, there were X males.

== Notable people ==
- Henry G. Bennett, longest-serving president of Oklahoma State University.
- Owanah Anderson - author and human rights activist.
