= Joseph Bradfield Thoburn =

American historian

Joseph B. Thoburn
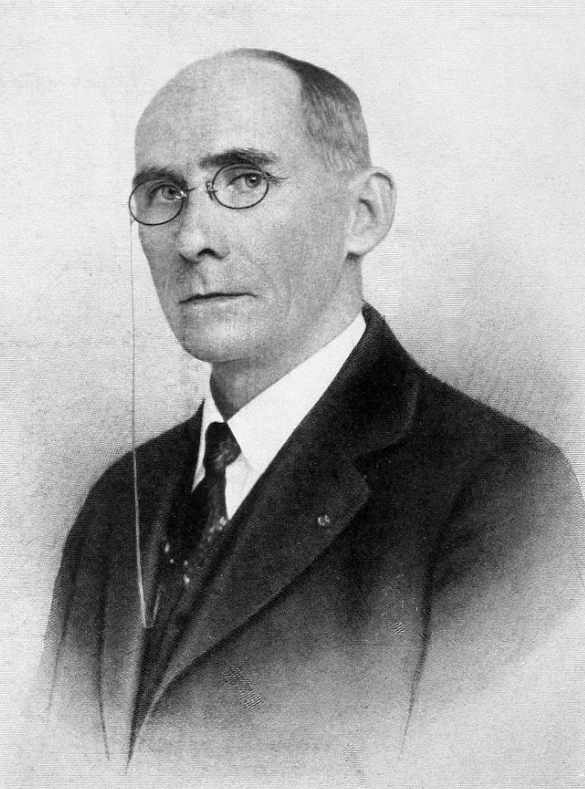
- Born: Joseph Bradfield Thoburn; August 8, 1866; Bellaire, Ohio
- Died: March 2, 1941 (aged 74); Oklahoma City, Oklahoma
- Occupations: Historian, writer, editor, educator, civic leader
- Years active: 1907–1931
- Known for: Director of Oklahoma Historical Society
- Notable work: Co-author of multivolume History of Oklahoma

Joseph Bradfield Thoburn (August 8, 1866 – March 2, 1941) was an educator, civic leader, writer, and historian.

== Education ==
In 1893, he graduated with a bachelor's degree in agriculture from Kansas State University, and was largely self-trained in a variety of other fields, such as archaeology and journalism. In 1896, he moved to Oklahoma City. He did scholarship on the history of Oklahoma, joined the History faculty at the University of Oklahoma, served for 38 years, and was inducted into the Oklahoma Hall of Fame.

== Early life ==
Thoburn was born in Bellaire, Ohio, the son of Thomas C. and Mary Eleanor (née Crozier) Thoburn. Thomas and Mary were both natives of Pennsylvania, and had lived near Pittsburgh. Thomas was a farmer and a Civil War veteran, who had been captured by the Confederate army, and spent several months in a prison camp before being paroled to return home. Thomas and Mary were married on September 26, 1865, a few days after Thomas was mustered out of the Union Army. The family moved to Marion County, Kansas in 1871, where Joseph grew up and graduated from the Agricultural College in Manhattan in 1893, with a bachelor's degree in Agriculture. (Note: This school later became Kansas State University.) In 1894, he married Caroline Conwell, who had been teaching at an academy in the Choctaw Nation, which was then in Indian Territory.

== Move to Oklahoma ==
The Thoburns moved to Oklahoma City in 1896. Joseph initially worked as a printer and journalist to develop and promote the commercial and educational aspects of Oklahoma City. He performed short-term jobs such as editing The Farm Journal. By May, 1902, he had joined the Oklahoma City Commercial Club and had been named as its secretary. He was active in organizing the Oklahoma City Chamber of Commerce, which became the successor to the Commercial Club. This brought him into the circle of Anton H. Classen and other Methodist civic leaders who were trying to establish Epworth University in Oklahoma City. (Note: Their effort was successful, and a few years later Epworth became Oklahoma City University, which is still operating.) Thoburn was appointed secretary of the Oklahoma Territorial Board of Agriculture (OTBA) in 1903, because of his interests in promoting water conservation and reclaiming land. His salary was fixed at $1000 per year, He remained in this job for two years. (Note: According to the Oklahoma Hall of Fame, Thoburn served for three years on the OTBA. The OTBA would have expired when Oklahoma became a state on November 16, 1907.)

On July 5, 1904, Thoburn was unanimously re-elected as the head of the Board of Agriculture for the coming year. Unexpectedly, he was unable to attend an executive session on the next day. The board limited his annual budget to $20 per month to cover the cost of buying a typewriter and hiring steographic help to handle the Department's business. It was later found that a faction of the board had been influenced by the Continental Creamery Company and a friend of that organization in the Oklahoma Senate had instituted this ploy to punish Thoburn for opposing their attempt to create a monopoly in the state creamery industry. The action stood despite opposition from many other powerful interests in the state, especially newspapers and politicians who recognized political skulduggery when they saw it. The president of the board responded to the protests by claiming that Thoburn was too inexperienced to handle the growing workload and needed to be replaced, effective immediately. The deed was done.

After his ouster from the OTBA, Thoburn accepted an offer to become managing editor of the Farmer's Magazine, where he could still employ his agricultural knowledge and his publication schools. He soon found that this job was insufficient challenge for his interests, so he left to become involved in the campaign to gain statehood by uniting the interests of both the Indian and Oklahoma Territories.

In February 1907, he became associated with the Jamestown Exposition Company and became responsible for the work needed to present the two territories' exhibits at a major fair that would be held in St. Louis. It was the kind of promotional worked he had always loved to do. The hardest part seemed to be raising funds. An associate of Thoburn's reportedly said about his experience in Muskogee, "..."jarring them loose from their coin is like pulling teeth without cocaine." Thoburn wrote a small book titled Oklahoma: Its Resources and Attractions and the Activities and Achievements of its People to promote the exposition.

He served as Secretary of Oklahoma's Territorial Board of Agriculture for two years and was Director of the Oklahoma Historical Society for 38 years. He was inducted into the Oklahoma Hall of Fame in 1932. His work included research on indigenous peoples and early settlers. He wrote a history of schools in Oklahoma in 1908.

In 1908, Thoburn then began researching and writing his first notable book about Oklahoma history, The History of Oklahoma (1908), the first Oklahoma history textbook in the state.

Thoburn met Muriel Hazel Wright in 1914 while he was a board member of the Oklahoma Historical Society. He helped shape her passion for Choctaw and Native American history and they collaborated on the four-volume Oklahoma: A History of the State and its People published in 1929. She also authored three textbooks about the state's history which were used in public schools: The Story of Oklahoma, Our Oklahoma and The Oklahoma History.

In 1917, Thoburn joined the History Department faculty of Oklahoma University, as the Instructor of research and collection.

== Bibliography ==
- A Standard History of Oklahoma, American Historical Society, 1916
