= Lydia Starr McPherson =

American newspaper founder, editor

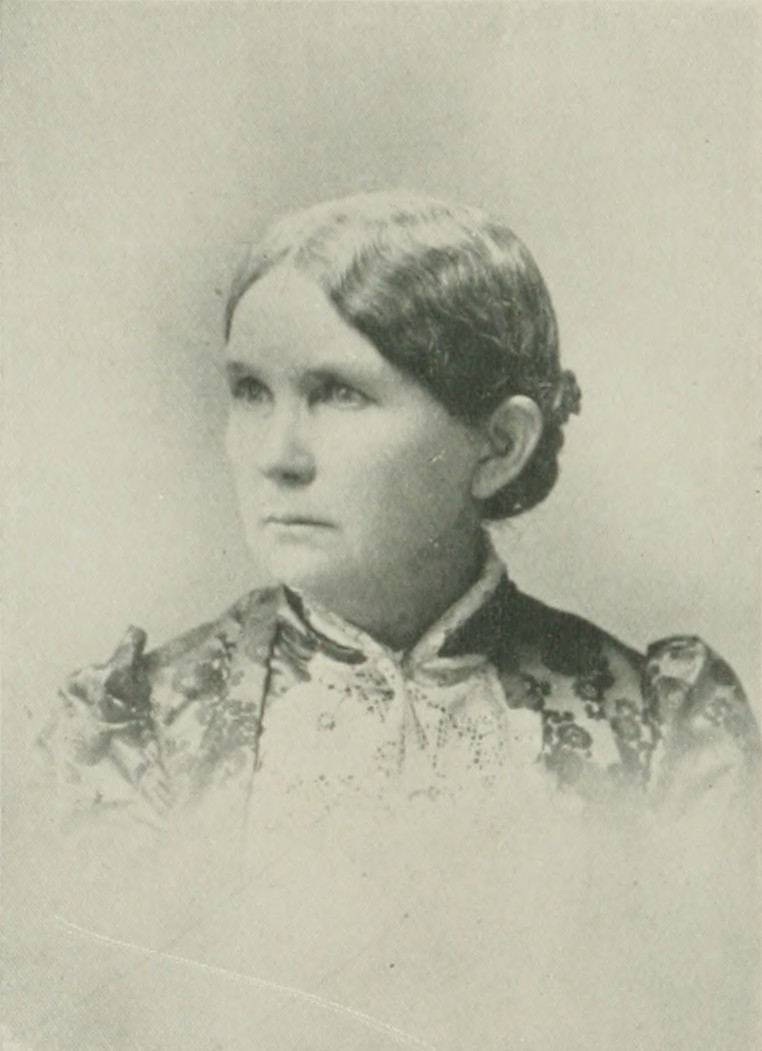
Lydia Starr McPherson, A Woman of the Century

Lydia Ann Starr Hunter McPherson (pen name, Urania; August 11, 1827 – December 3, 1903) was an American newspaper editor. She founded the first newspapers in Oklahoma and Texas published by a woman.

== Early life and family ==
Lydia Ann Starr was born in Warnock, Ohio, the daughter of William F. Starr and Sarah Lucas Starr. When she was 12, the family moved to Iowa, and at the age of 17, she became a teacher in a local school.

Around 1848, she married David Hunter, with whom she had five children. She was widowed after a short marriage.

== Career ==
Around 1874, she moved to Caddo, in what was then Indiana Territory and is now Oklahoma and began working as an editor on the Oklahoma Star. She also wrote for the paper under the pen name "Urania". In December 1874, she married Granville McPherson, then the newspaper's chief editor. Around 1876, the couple split, and sometime between 1878 and 1880, Granville moved to Texas and remarried.

McPherson remained in Caddo, where she founded a new newspaper, the Caddo International News, making her the first woman publisher of a newspaper in Oklahoma. Two of her sons did the printing for her.

In 1877, McPherson moved across the Red River to Whitesboro, Texas, where she founded a weekly newspaper, the Whitesboro Democrat. It was the first newspaper in Texas published by a woman. It subsequently moved to Sherman, Texas and became a daily under the name Sherman Democrat in 1879.

In 1881, she became one of the first three women to join the State Press Association of Texas and was elected corresponding secretary. She served as a delegate to the World's Press Association convention in Cincinnati, Ohio, in 1886.

In 1886, she was appointed postmaster of Sherman, a position she held for four years.

McPherson wrote for other periodicals as well as her own newspapers, contributing to Cosmopolitan magazine and Youth's Companion, among others. In 1892, she published a collection of her own verse entitled Reullura.
