= Jackson County, Choctaw Nation =

Jackson County was a political subdivision of the Choctaw Nation of Indian Territory, prior to Oklahoma being admitted as a state. The county formed part of the Nation's Pushmataha District, or Third District, one of three administrative super-regions.

== History ==
The county was named for Jacob Jackson, a prominent Choctaw. It was organized from portions of Blue County, Jack's Fork County and Kiamitia County by an Act of the General Council on October 21, 1886.

Jackson County's boundaries were established and designated according to easily recognizable natural landmarks, as were the boundaries of all Choctaw Nation counties. Island Bayou, Muddy Boggy Creek, the Blue River, and the Red River, all of which were regionally significant waterways, formed its boundaries.

Jackson County was bordered on its east by Kiamitia County and on its west by Blue County. Its county seat was Pigeon Roost, south of present-day Boswell. The county also hosted Mayhew, the capital of the Pushmataha District. Mayhew was located north of present-day Boswell.

The county served as an election district for members of the National Council, and as a unit of local administration. Constitutional officers, all of whom served for two-year terms and were elected by the voters, included the county judge, sheriff, and a ranger. The judge's duties included oversight of overall county administration. The sheriff collected taxes, monitored unlawful intrusion by intruders (usually white Americans from the United States), and conducted the census. The county ranger advertised and sold strayed livestock.

== Statehood ==
As Oklahoma's statehood approached, its leading citizens, who were gathered for the Oklahoma Constitutional Convention, realized in laying out the future state's counties that, while logically designed, the Choctaw Nation's counties could not exist as economically viable political subdivisions. In most the county seat existed generally for holding county court and not as a population center.

This conundrum was also recognized by the framers of the proposed State of Sequoyah, who met in 1905 to propose statehood for the Indian Territory. The Sequoyah Constitutional Convention also proposed a county structure that abolished the Choctaw counties. Jackson County was divided principally into the proposed Blue County, Tom Needles County, and Hitchcock County. Caddo would have been county seat of Blue; Durant the county seat of Tom Needles; and Hugo the county seat of Hitchcock.

Much of this proposition was borrowed two years later by Oklahoma's framers, who adopted certain of these concepts for the future Bryan County and Choctaw County in Oklahoma. The territory formerly comprising Jackson County, Choctaw Nation now falls primarily within these two counties, with a small portion in Atoka County.

Jackson County ceased to exist upon Oklahoma’s statehood on November 16, 1907.
