= Anna W. Ludlow =

Choctaw teacher (1865 – 1955)

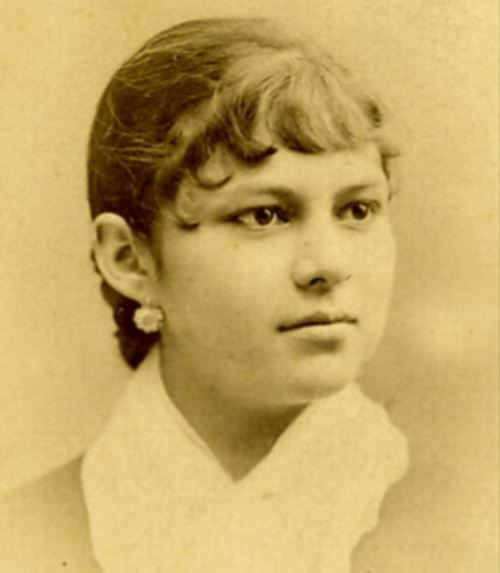
Anna Ludlow

Anna Ludlow (née Wright, 1865 – 1955) was a Choctaw teacher and philanthropist.

== Life ==
She was born Anna Wright at Boggy Depot, the daughter of Rev. Allen Wright, Principal Chief of the Choctaw and Methodist minister, and his wife Harriet Newell Mitchell. She was involved in the Methodist church from childhood.

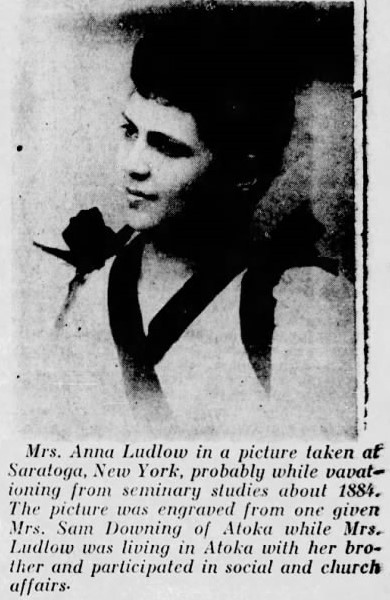
Anna Ludlow in about 1884

She attended Northfield Seminary for Young Ladies, Massachusetts, from 1880 – 1884. She also graduated from Kirkwood Seminary, Missouri, in 1886, winning the school's prize for vocal music in her final year.

She taught at schools at Lehigh and Atoka and at the Tushkahoma National Female seminary, which had opened in 1892. In 1897 she was teaching there alongside her sister Katherine.

On 22 November 1893 she married Edwin Ludlow, superintendent of mines for the Choctaw Coal and Railway Company. They had one son, who died in infancy. They lived first at Hartshorne, and Edwin's work brought them to Coahuila, West Virginia, Pennsylvania, and New York. When Edwin died in 1924, Anna lived with her brother Allen Wright. Edwin's obituary praised the contribution that Anna's 'delightful personality and open-handed hospitality' made to the company.

A member of the First Presbyterian church, she 'was widely known for her interests and philanthropies in Presbyterian missions.' In her final years she donated land for the Old Boggy Depot memorial park.

She died 11 July 1955 at McAlester, Oklahoma.
