= Blue County, Choctaw Nation =

Political subdivision of the Choctaw Nation of Indian Territory

Blue County was a political subdivision of the Choctaw Nation of Indian Territory, prior to Oklahoma being admitted as a state. The county formed part of the Nation’s Pushmataha District, or Third District, one of three administrative super-regions.

== History ==
The county, also called Okchamali Kaunti, from the Choctaw word okchamali, or blue, took its name from the Blue River, an important waterway. Chahta Tamaha, also known as Armstrong Academy, was designated as the county seat on February 18, 1863. The last county seat was Caddo, Indian Territory—the present-day Caddo, Oklahoma, which was also the largest town in Blue County prior to the coming of the railroads.

Blue County was one of the original 19 counties created by the General Council of the Choctaw Nation in 1850. Prior to being known as Blue County, the area was called Tiger Spring County—or Koi Kulih Kaunti in Choctaw. The Choctaw word koi means “panther,” or tiger, and kulih means “spring of water.” Historians believe the name referred to a specific spring, although its location is now unknown. Its name was changed to Blue County by an act of the General Council of the Choctaw Nation on November 5, 1854.

Blue County’s boundaries were established and designated according to easily recognizable natural landmarks, as were the boundaries of all Choctaw Nation counties. As example, Clear Boggy Creek formed most of its northern border, and Island Bayou formed most of its southern border. Blue River, which cut diagonally across the county, formed a portion of its southeastern border.

Blue County was bordered on its north by Atoka County, Choctaw Nation and on its east by Jackson County, Choctaw Nation. To its west was the Chickasaw Nation. Originally larger than in later years, Blue County lost territory when a new county, Jackson County, was carved out of portions of Atoka County, Blue County and Kiamitia County in 1886.

The county served as an election district for members of the National Council, and as a unit of local administration. Constitutional officers, all of whom served for two-year terms and were elected by the voters, included the county judge, sheriff, and a ranger. The judge’s duties included oversight of overall county administration. The sheriff collected taxes, monitored unlawful intrusion by intruders (usually white Americans from the United States), and conducted the census. The county ranger advertised and sold strayed livestock.

== Statehood ==
As Oklahoma’s statehood approached, its leading citizens, who were gathered for the Oklahoma Constitutional Convention, realized in laying out the future state’s counties that, while logically designed, the Choctaw Nation’s counties could not exist as economically viable political subdivisions. In most the county seat existed generally for holding county court and not as a population center. While this was not generally true of Blue County, with its bustling commercial towns of Caddo and Durant, it would have to be dismantled in order to accommodate changes required by the region at large.

This conundrum was also recognized by the framers of the proposed State of Sequoyah, who met in 1905 to propose statehood for the Indian Territory. The Sequoyah Constitutional Convention also proposed a county structure that abolished the Choctaw counties. Blue County was divided principally into the proposed Blue County and Tom Needles County. Caddo would have been Blue County’s chief town, while Boswell, Colbert, Durant, and Sterrett (now Calera) would have guaranteed Tom Needles County’s commercial success.

Much of this proposition was borrowed two years later by Oklahoma’s framers, who adopted certain of these concepts for the future Bryan County in Oklahoma. The territory formerly comprising Blue County, Choctaw Nation now falls primarily within Atoka and Bryan counties. Blue County ceased to exist upon Oklahoma's statehood on November 16, 1907.
