= Owanah Anderson =

Choctaw author and Indigenous rights activist

Owanah P. Anderson (February 18, 1926 – March 24, 2017) was a Choctaw author and Indigenous rights activist. Though Anderson published two books, Jamestown Commitment: The Episcopal Church and the American Indian and 400 Years: Anglican/Episcopal Mission Among American Indians, and co-authored multiple other publications, she was most recognized for her work with the Native American Ministries of the Episcopal Church as well as for her achievements in improving the lives of indigenous peoples, especially women. Anderson held a variety of jobs throughout her professional career that focused on expanding women's access to healthcare as well as their educational and professional opportunities.

== Early life ==
Owanah Patricia Anderson was born on February 18, 1926, in Boswell, Oklahoma, to parents Samantha (Jones) and John Boyt Pickens. She had a brother, Lon Michael Pickens, and attended high school in Boswell, Oklahoma, where she was elected as valedictorian of her graduating class. She then went on to earn a degree in journalism at the University of Oklahoma in Norman, Oklahoma, with the financial aid of a merit-based scholarship.

== Career and activism ==
=== For indigenous women ===
Anderson participated in the 1977 National Women's Conference in Houston, Texas, by acting as co-chairperson of the Texas executive committee for the state conference preceding the national one. Efforts of the women involved led to the National Women's Agenda's approval. The comprehensive agenda called for reproductive freedom, action against rape and violence, action in support of lesbian rights and the rights of women of color, and the ratification of the Equal Rights Amendment. Following her involvement in the 1977 Women's Conference, she worked to raise awareness on Native American women's issues regarding access to healthcare and educational opportunities by serving on the Committee on Rights and Responsibilities of Women formed by the Department of Health, Education, and Welfare for about three years until 1980. From 1978 to 1981, Anderson also served on President Jimmy Carter's Advisory Committee on Women.

In 1979, she founded and directed the Ohoyo Resource Center for the U.S. Department of Education to provide women with resources needed to network and advance their careers. Ohoyo is actually the Choctaw word for "woman", and the resource guide Anderson co-authored, Ohoyo One Thousand: Resource Guide of American Indian and Alaska Native Women, definitely positively impacted indigenous women's lives, especially when it helped keep the women connected to their networks when the center closed down in 1983. Furthermore, during her time working with the Association on American Indian Affairs, she directed the National Women's Development Program.

=== With the Episcopal Church ===
Anderson moved to New York in 1983 following the Ohoyo Research Center's closing to join the National Committee on Indian Affairs of the Episcopal Church as chairperson, where she was in charge of the annual $1.5 million budget allocated to fund Episcopal missions for Native American communities until her retirement in 1998. She also assisted in the development of the Anglican Indigenous People's Network of the Pacific Rim, which created a network that enabled diverse groups of indigenous peoples of many different countries around the Pacific, such as Hawaii, Australia, and New Zealand to come together, connect, and learn from and about each other.

=== For indigenous peoples ===
In 1980, Anderson was the only Native American representative for the Commission on Security and Cooperation in Europe that was held that year in Madrid, Spain. Anderson was an active member of the Association on American Indian Affairs from 1985 to 2000, which is a non-profit organization that focuses on advocating for Native American and Alaska Native peoples' rights and welfare. She dedicated fifteen years of her life to this specific organization and mission, for most of which she served on the board of directors. In the late 1980's, she also became involved with the national treaty rights organization HONOR, which works to ensure that the many existing tribal treaties are honored by the U.S. government.

== Works authored ==
- In 1980, Anderson compiled and edited the Resource Guide of American Indian and Alaska Native Women along with co-author Sedelta D. Verble, which was published in 1981. The document listed more than six hundred prominent Native American and Alaska Native women of over one hundred and fifty tribes throughout the United States and provided the women's names, tribal affiliation, addresses, contact information, current employment information, activities and involvement in advocacy, educational backgrounds, and professional interests as a strong networking tool. In 1982, the document was republished as Ohoyo One Thousand: Resource Guide of American Indian and Alaska Native Women as an expanded edition with now more than one thousand women listed and two hundred and thirty one tribes represented.
- In 1988, Anderson published Jamestown Commitment: The Episcopal Church and the American Indian about the Episcopal Church's missions in the early years of interaction between European colonists and Native American communities. The book paints early requests made by tribal leaders for missionaries to educate tribes on Christianity and the English language as significant parts of Native American history that should be remembered.
- In 1992, she published her book 100 Years: Good Shepherd Mission in the Navajo Nation 1892-1992, which elaborated on Episcopal missionary efforts specifically in relation to the Navajo Nation.
- In 1997, Anderson's book, 400 Years: Anglican/Episcopal Mission Among American Indians, was published as an expansion on her previous book, Jamestown Commitment.

== Awards and honors ==
- Anderson received the 1981 Anne Roe Award for public service from the Harvard University Graduate School of Education.
- In 1984, she became a member of the North Texas Women's Hall of Fame.
- In 1987, Anderson was honored by the National Coalition of Women of Color.
- In 1989, she was awarded an honorary doctorate from Seabury-Western Theological Seminary of the Episcopal Church in Evanston, Illinois.
- In 2014, the Association on American Indian Affairs (AAIA) named a merit-based scholarship after her.

== Scholarship ==
In recognition of Anderson's strong leadership and 15-year commitment to the Association on American Indian Affairs (AAIA), the non-profit organization decided to name an annual merit-based scholarship after her. The scholarship, first awarded for the 2014-2015 academic year, provides funding to indigenous women who are enrolled tribal citizens of the continental United States or Alaska for pursuing an Associate's degree or higher as full time students. To be eligible, students must at least have a 2.5 out of 4.0 GPA and be enrolled in a tribe, regardless of whether it is recognized at federal or state levels.

== Personal life ==
Sometime after graduating high school, Anderson married her first husband and had a son, Steven Shelton, who she raised on her own. The couple divorced, and later she met Henry Anderson, an attorney in Wichita Falls, Texas, whose children she helped raise. In 1983, Henry Anderson died, and Owanah Anderson moved to New York to become chairperson of the National Committee on Indian Affairs of the Episcopal Church.

== Death ==
Owanah Anderson died on March 24, 2017, in Wichita Falls, Texas, after a decade of declining health, at 91 years old. She was surrounded by her son, Steven Shelton and others during her last moments and was buried at All Saints' Church in Wichita Falls at 10 AM on Wednesday, March 27, 2017. She is survived by her son, two grandsons, three great grandchildren, two stepdaughters, stepson, sister-in-law, and many step grandchildren, all of whom she loved.
