= Todd Downing (writer) =

Native American mystery writer (1902–1974)

- Born: George Todd Downing; 29 March 1902; Atoka, Indian Territory, United States
- Died: 9 January 1974 (aged 71)
- Occupation: Author
- Writing career
- Genre: Mystery fiction

George Todd Downing (March 29, 1902 – January 9, 1974), a member of the Choctaw Nation of Oklahoma, was one of the first commercially published mystery writers of Native American descent and one of the first successful mystery writers from Oklahoma.

== Biography ==
Downing was born on March 29, 1902, in Atoka, Indian Territory (now Oklahoma). His paternal grandmother, Millissa Armstrong came to present-day Oklahoma as part of the Choctaw Trail of Tears in 1830. She married George T. Downing and their son, Samuel, was born in the Choctaw Nation in 1872. Samuel, Todd Downing's father, served in the Rough Riders as an interpreter, was a member of the Oklahoma statehood delegation to Washington, D.C., and a member of the Choctaw Tribal Council. He married, Todd Downing's mother, Maude Miller, in 1899.

Todd Downing was a Phi Beta Kappa student at the University of Oklahoma, where he studied languages and earned a bachelor's degree in 1924 and a Master's in 1928. He spoke five languages: Choctaw, English, Spanish, French, and Italian. As a student and following graduation, he wrote book reviews for Books Abroad and the Daily Oklahoman. From 1928 to 1934, he was the business manager for Books Abroad. He also led tours to Mexico, which inspired his first book, Murder on Tour, featuring the recurring character, U.S. Customs Agent Hugh Rennert. In the space of nine years, Downing published six Hugh Rennert novels, two mysteries featuring the character Sheriff Peter Bounty, and a non-fiction book, The Mexican Earth, telling Mexican history from an indigenous perspective.

After finding some success as a writer, Downing moved to New York City and then Philadelphia, where he worked in advertising, including for a time at N. W. Ayer and Son. In 1942, his novel The Cat Screams was adapted into a Broadway play at the Martin Beck Theatre, but it closed after just seven performances.

In 1951, Downing returned to Atoka and cared for his elderly parents in his family home. He began a new career as a high school teacher in Atoka. He also wrote newspaper articles on the Choctaw language and he periodically taught Choctaw at the college level. In 1971, the Bureau of Indian Affairs published some of his Choctaw language writings as Chahta Anampa.

When Downing died in 1974, his books were out of print and little remembered. In 1996, the University of Oklahoma Press reissued The Mexican Earth, with a critical introduction by Wolfgang Hochbruck. In recent years, Coachwhip Publications, the Mysterious Press, and Open Road Media have brought Downing's mystery novels back into print.

Some recent scholarship suggests that Downing, who never married, might have been gay.

== Bibliography ==
=== Fiction ===
- Murder on Tour (G. P. Putnam's Sons, 1933). A Hugh Rennert mystery.
- The Cat Screams (The Crime Club, 1934). A Hugh Rennert mystery.
- Vultures in the Sky (The Crime Club, 1935). A Hugh Rennert mystery.
- Murder on the Tropic (The Crime Club, 1935). A Hugh Rennert mystery.
- The Case of the Unconquered Sisters (The Crime Club, 1936). A Hugh Rennert mystery.
- The Last Trumpet: Murder in a Mexican Bull Ring (The Crime Club, 1937). A Hugh Rennert mystery.
- Night Over Mexico (The Crime Club, 1937). A Hugh Rennert mystery.
- Death Under the Moonflower (The Crime Club, 1938). A Sheriff Peter Bounty mystery.
- The Lazy Lawrence Murders (The Crime Club, 1941). A Sheriff Peter Bounty mystery.

=== Non-fiction ===
- The Life and Works of Florencio Sánchez (M.A. thesis, 1928)
- The Mexican Earth (Doubleday, Doran, 1940).
- Chahta Anampa: An Introduction to Choctaw Grammar (Area Office of the United States Bureau of Indian Affairs, 1971)
- Cultural Traits of the Choctaws (Choctaw Bilingual Education Program, Southeastern State College, 1973)
