= Atoka Municipal Airport =

- IATA: none; ICAO: KAQR; FAA LID: AQR

Summary
- Airport type: Public
- Owner: City of Atoka
- Serves: Atoka, Oklahoma
- Elevation AMSL: 590 ft (180 m)
- Coordinates: 34°23′54″N 096°08′53″W

Map
- Location within Oklahoma Location within the United States

Runways
Direction	Length		Surface
Direction	ft	m	Surface
18/36	3,015	919	Asphalt

Statistics (2009)
- Aircraft operations: 3,500
- Source: Federal Aviation Administration

Atoka Municipal Airport (ICAO: KAQR, FAA LID: AQR) is a mile north of Atoka, in Atoka County, Oklahoma. The National Plan of Integrated Airport Systems for 2021–2025 categorized it as a general aviation airport.

Most U.S. airports use the same three-letter location identifier for the FAA and IATA, but this airport is AQR to the FAA and has no IATA code.

== Facilities ==
The airport covers 490 acres (200 ha) at an elevation of 590 feet (180 m). Its single runway, 18/36, is 3,015 by 40 feet (919 m × 12 m) asphalt. In the year ending July 28, 2009 the airport had 3,500 general aviation aircraft operations, average 291 per month.

== See also ==
- List of airports in Oklahoma
