= World Literature Today =

American magazine

- World Literature Today, March 2013 issue
- Editor-in-chief: Daniel Simon
- Categories: Literature, Culture, International
- Frequency: 6 per year
- Publisher: University of Oklahoma
- First issue: January 1927; 99 years ago
- Country: United States
- Based in: Norman, Oklahoma
- Language: American English
- Website: worldliteraturetoday.org
- ISSN: 0196-3570

World Literature Today (WLT) is an American magazine of international literature and culture, published at the University of Oklahoma. The magazine's stated goal is to publish international essays, poetry, fiction, interviews, and book reviews for a non-academic audience. It was founded under the name Books Abroad in 1927 by Roy Temple House, a professor at the University of Oklahoma. In January 1977, the journal assumed its present name, World Literature Today.

== History ==
The original WLT logo

The first issue of World Literature Today (WLT) was published in 1927 and was 32 pages in length. By the magazine's fiftieth year, the issues were more than 250 pages long. In 2006, WLT switched from a quarterly to a bimonthly publication.

House served as editor from 1927 until his retirement in 1949. Todd Downing, a Choctaw author and former student of House's, worked for the publication in varying capacities between 1928 and 1934. House was succeeded as editor by the German critic and novelist Ernst Erich Noth, who went on to edit the journal for ten years. During his tenure, Noth narrowed the scope of the publication to writers of the 20th century and focused on reviewing only books that had been published no more than two years earlier. He also introduced a new feature, "Periodicals in Review" (sometimes appearing as "Periodicals at Large"), which surveyed the policies and initiatives of several literary journals from Europe, the Americas, and throughout the world.

Viennese scholar Wolfgang Bernard Fleischmann directed WLT for about two years beginning in 1959. In 1961, Fleischmann was succeeded by Czech émigré Robert Vlach, a professor of modern languages at the University of Oklahoma. Vlach established a new review section in the journal devoted to Slavic languages. He also initiated the Books Abroad symposia, which took place at the annual convention of the Modern Language Association. After Vlach's death in 1966, former Assistant Editor Bernice Duncan briefly served as editor until Ivar Ivask assumed the role in 1967. In 1977, the name of the magazine was changed from Books Abroad to World Literature Today.

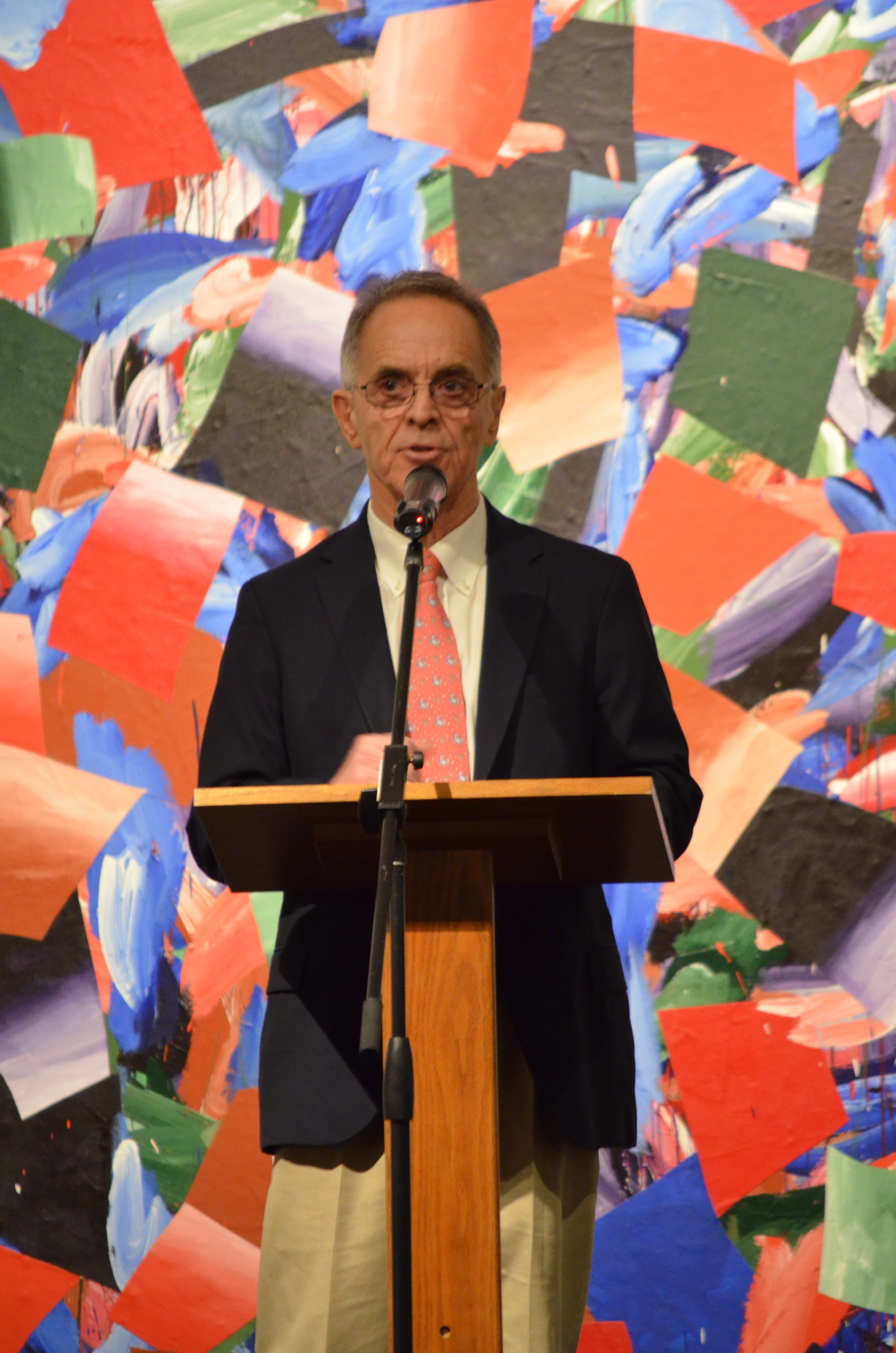
R.C. Davis-Undiano at 2015 Neustadt Festival

Robert Con Davis-Undiano, Professor of English at the University of Oklahoma, became the director of WLT in 1999.

In 2017, Latin American Literature Today, a sister journal to World Literature Today focusing on Latin American literature, was established.

== Sponsored prizes and festivals ==
World Literature Today sponsors the biennial Neustadt International Prize for Literature, the NSK Neustadt Prize for Children's and Young Adult Literature, and the Puterbaugh Festival of International Literature and Culture.

- Neustadt International Prize for Literature, worth $50,000
- The Puterbaugh Festival
- NSK Neustadt Prize for Children's and Young Adult Literature

=== Nobel Prize connection ===
Since the founding of World Literature Today, the magazine's editors have encouraged debate about the annual presentation of the Nobel Prize in Literature. In 1940, the publication hosted a "Super-Nobel" election in which contributors and other specialists were invited to choose the writer they felt had offered the most significant contribution to world literature in the first third of the 20th century, regardless of whether that writer had won the Nobel Prize. The award went to Thomas Mann, who won the Nobel Prize in 1929 and was a frequent contributor to World Literature Today.

In 1948, WLT founding editor Roy Temple House was nominated for the Nobel Peace Prize. When the South Central Modern Language Association held its annual meeting in Norman, Oklahoma, in October that year, the association formally endorsed Professor House for the prize.

The Spring 1981 issue of WLT was devoted entirely to the presentation of the members of the Swedish academy, many of whom were successful creative writers in their own right. In 1951, the Nobel Foundation chose the University of Oklahoma Press to issue the first English-language edition of its authoritative volume, entitled Nobel: The Man and His Prizes. Also, the often-synchronistic relationship between the Neustadt Prize, once described by The New York Times as the "Oklahoma 'Nobel'" (February 1982), and the Nobel Prize itself is demonstrated in the number of convergences. Between 1970 and 2025, a total of 34 writers affiliated with the Neustadt Prize (as jurors, candidates, or winners) went on to receive the Nobel after their association with the Neustadt, including Tomas Tranströmer, who was the 1990 Neustadt laureate and 2011 Nobel laureate.

== Recent history ==
In late 2000, the editors worked with 40 scholars to establish a list of the "Most Important Works in World Literature, 1927–2001", a project organized and timed to help celebrate WLT's 75th year of uninterrupted publication. The top-40 list was chosen by specialists with the nonspecialist in mind, to invite response and debate among readers and writers.

A Compass on the Navigable Sea: 100 Years of World Literature, edited by Daniel Simon, commemorates the magazine’s 100th year of continuous publication. Published by Restless Books in 2026, the centennial anthology features more than 130 essays, book reviews, interviews, poems, stories, and letters that have appeared in the magazine since its founding in 1927. The magazine published a centennial issue in September 2026.

== See also ==
- List of literary magazines
