= Muriel Hazel Wright =

Native American historian (1889–1975)

Historian of Oklahoma Muriel Hazel Wright
- Born: March 31, 1889; Lehigh, Choctaw Nation, Indian Territory
- Died: February 27, 1975 (aged 85); Oklahoma City, U.S.
- Citizenship: United States; Choctaw Nation
- Education: East Central Normal School; Columbia University (Barnard College)
- Occupations: Historian, teacher, writer
- Employer: Oklahoma Historical Society
- Known for: Editor of the Chronicles of Oklahoma

Muriel Hazel Wright (31 March 1889 – 27 February 1975) was an American teacher, historian and writer on the Choctaw Nation. A native of Indian Territory, she was the daughter of mixed-blood Choctaw physician Eliphalet Wright and the granddaughter of the Choctaw chief Allen Wright. She wrote several books about Oklahoma and was unofficially called "Historian of Oklahoma". She also was very active in the Oklahoma Historical Society and served as editor of the Chronicles of Oklahoma from 1955 to 1971.

== Early life ==
Wright was born in Lehigh, Choctaw Nation, Indian Territory (now known as Lehigh, Oklahoma) in 1889. Her father was Eliphalet Wright, a Choctaw who had graduated from Union College and Albany Medical College. He had returned to the Choctaw Nation in 1895 to be a doctor for the Missouri-Pacific coal mines at Lehigh and to open a private medical practice. Eliphalet's father was Allen Wright, who was principal chief of the Choctaw Nation from 1866 to 1870.

Muriel's paternal grandmother was Harriet Newell Mitchell, a native of Dayton, Ohio. She came to Indian Territory as a Presbyterian missionary teacher and married Allen Wright in 1857. Harriet could claim descendence from people who had come to America aboard the Mayflower in 1620. (Note: Thus, Muriel was a direct descendant of William Brewster (Mayflower passenger), a signer of the Mayflower Compact.) Muriel's mother was Ida Belle Richards, who was also a missionary.

Muriel Wright attended Wheaton Seminary in Norton, Massachusetts. After returning to her home town, she completed a teacher's education course at East Central Normal School in Ada, Oklahoma in 1912. After getting her certificate, she went to work from 1912 until the mid-1920s as a teacher and as a principal in various schools in southeastern Oklahoma. She took time from 1916 – 1917 to attend Barnard College at Columbia University, where she studied English and history.

== Career as historian and author ==
Always proud of her Choctaw heritage, her passion for Native American history blossomed after she met author and journalist Joseph B. Thoburn in 1914. He was a board member of the Oklahoma Historical Society and they collaborated on the four-volume Oklahoma: A History of the State and its People, published in 1929. She also authored three textbooks about the state's history which were used in public schools: The Story of Oklahoma, Our Oklahoma and The Oklahoma History.

In 1922, she joined the Oklahoma Historical Society (OHS), where she was very active for much of her life. After 1924, she devoted her time to writing about the Native Americans of Oklahoma. She contributed to and edited the OHS quarterly journal, The Chronicles of Oklahoma, although she was not formally given the title of editor until 1955. (Note: Laughlin states that Wright performed all the journal's editorial functions without the title of editor from 1943 to 1955.)

Her 1951 book, A Guide to the Indian Tribes of Oklahoma, is still a standard source for information about the 67 tribes then living in Oklahoma. She covered topics such as each tribe's location, number of members, history, government and organization, contemporary life and culture, ceremonials and public dances, as well as their removal experiences and their adaptations to changes in Indian Territory.

During the 1950s, the Oklahoma Historical Society wanted to promote a new state-wide awareness of Oklahoma history by creating historical markers for sites that they deemed important to the subject. The project was led by George H. Shirk, with Wright doing the majority of the research for the inscriptions. Wright developed an initial list of 512 sites. The list was published in the Chronicles of Oklahoma in 1958 and had grown to 557 sites. Shirk and Wright then collaborated to produce the book Oklahoma Historical Markers, which focused on 131 of the sites they deemed most important. In 1966, she performed a similar project with LeRoy H. Fischer on Civil War Sites in Oklahoma, which identified each site and described its significance. She followed up this work by leading public tours of the sites, sponsored by the OHS.

Wright took a leading role in negotiating for Choctaw rights and compensation for the loss of their historic lands. During the political battle which then ensued between incumbent Chief William A. Durant and the populist Harry J. W. Belvin, Wright joined fellow Choctaw Czarina Conlan and threw her support behind Durant, who later lost the election.

The North American Indian Women's Association named Wright the outstanding Indian woman of the 20th century in 1971.

Wright retired in 1973. She died of a stroke in Oklahoma City on February 27, 1975. She was buried at Rose Hill Burial Park in Oklahoma City. She also has a memorial marker at Boggy Depot Cemetery in Atoka, Oklahoma. Her historical papers are housed at the Oklahoma Historical Society in Oklahoma City.

== Books ==
- The story of Oklahoma, 1923
- Oklahoma: A History of the State and its People, 1929 (co-author with Joseph B. Thoburn)
- The Oklahoma History, 1929
- Our Oklahoma, 1939
- A Guide to the Indian Tribes of Oklahoma, 1951
- Mark of Heritage: Oklahoma Historical Markers, 1958 (co-author with George H. Shirk)
- Civil War Sites in Oklahoma, 1966 (co-author with LeRoy H. Fischer)

== Awards ==
- Oklahoma Hall of Fame, 1940
- University of Oklahoma's Distinguished Service Award, 1948
- Oklahoma City Business and Professional Woman of the Year, 1950
- Honorary Doctor of Humane Letters, Oklahoma University, 1964
- Honorary Doctor of Humanities, Oklahoma City University, 1964
- National American Indian Women's Association Award, 1971
- Oklahoma Historians Hall of Fame, 1993
