= Pushmataha District =

Pushmataha
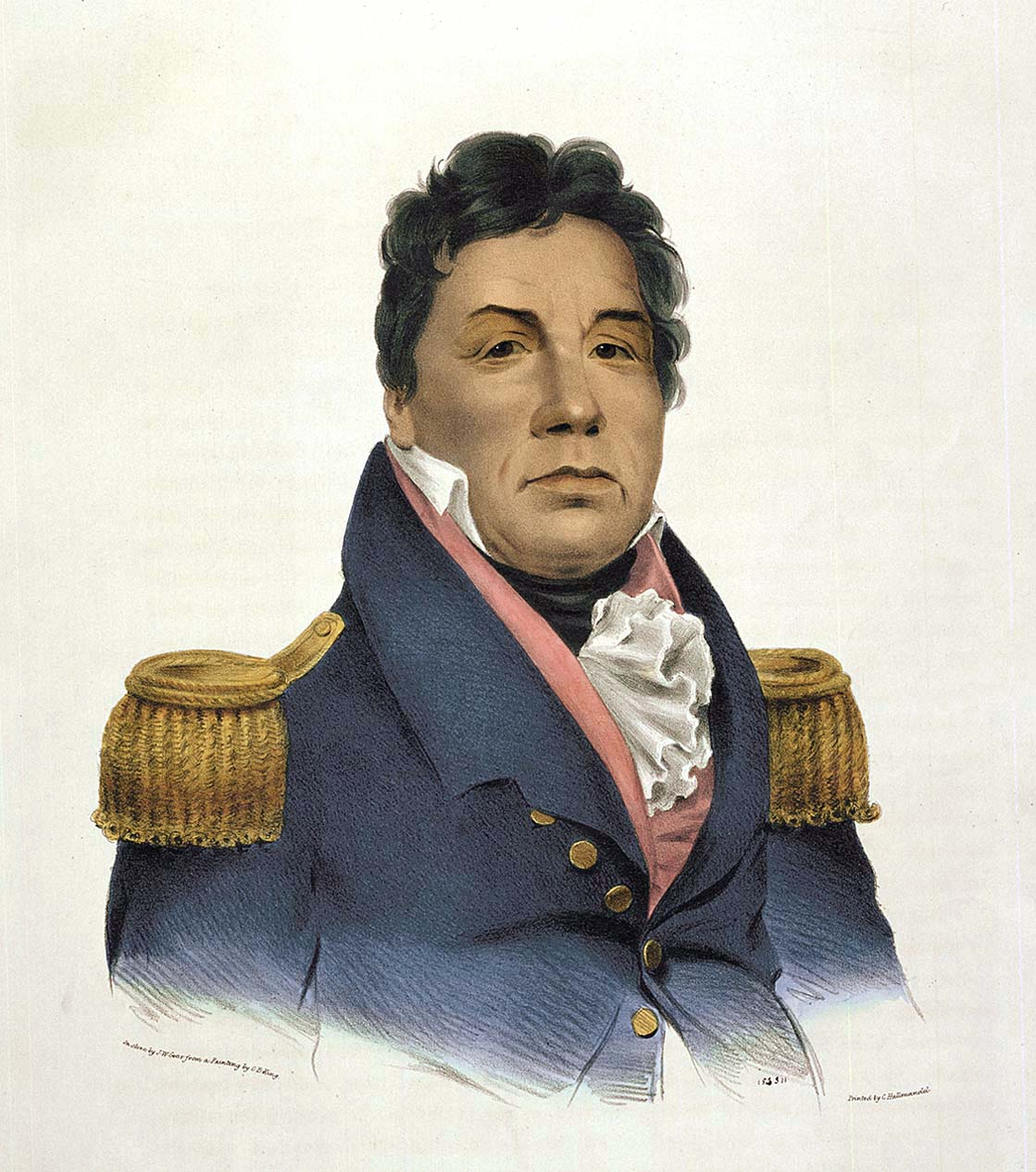
- Chief Pushmataha, 1824, published in History of the Indian Tribes of North America.

Pushmataha District was one of three provinces, or districts, comprising the former Choctaw Nation in the Indian Territory. Also called the Third District, it encompassed the southwestern one-third of the nation.

The Pushmataha District was named in honor of Pushmataha, a revered Choctaw warrior and statesman who was chief of Okla Hannali, the Six Towns District, one of the three historic, major clan divisions of the Choctaw in their historic territory of the Southeast. The other two districts were the Apukshunnubbee District and Moshulatubbee District.

== History ==
These three districts were established when the Choctaw Nation relocated via the Trail of Tears to the Indian Territory. They were originally intended to provide homes for settlers from the three major clans or groupings of Choctaw Indians comprising the nation. Over time, the clan affiliations and allegiances rapidly became less important after the Choctaw reached Indian Territory, in part because the geography was different, and there was great disruption due to population loss in the removal.

The districts' importance in the political life of the nation gradually waned, and the three district chiefs lost power and authority to the principal chief of the Nation. Eventually the principal chief became the chief. No longer a "first among equals", he became the sole political leader.

In judicial affairs, however, the three districts and their seats of government retained their historic influence. Crimes and criminals not tried at the county level were bucked to the district level automatically, and court days were the busiest days of the year in the district seats of government.

Pushmataha District's final and most important administrative seat of government was Mayhew, Indian Territory. This was started as a former Presbyterian missionary station. Present-day Boswell, Oklahoma developed about two miles south of its location.

The first district seat was Tiak Heli, "between the forks of the Boggy" ("or Boggies"), as it was called. The site was difficult to reach, being situated between the small rivers of Clear Boggy Creek and Muddy Boggy Creek. Few ferries operated on the rivers to provide convenient crossings. When the court house at Tiak Heli burned in the last part of the 19th century, the district moved its administrative center to Mayhew. Present-day Sunkist, Oklahoma (in southeastern Atoka County) developed about one-half mile west of that historic community.

"I never understood why court was held in the forks of the Boggy, forcing everyone who attended to cross a river," an early-day settler said decades later. He thought the district seat was likely considered to be in the center of general population. But, he said, "There were no ferries, nor bridges above the forks of the Boggy."

Another settler recalled the post oak tree was used as the "whipping tree". Judges of the Choctaw district courts sentenced some criminals to whippings as punishment. As of 1937, the tree was still in existence.

Included in the Pushmataha District were the Choctaw Nation counties of Atoka, Jack's Fork, Blue, Jackson, and Kiamitia (Kiamichi).

As Oklahoma's statehood loomed, the Pushmataha District, and its constituent counties, slowly wound down their governmental functions as the United States Courts in the Indian Territory assumed their powers. On November 16, 1907—Oklahoma's Statehood Day—the district and its counties disappeared forever.

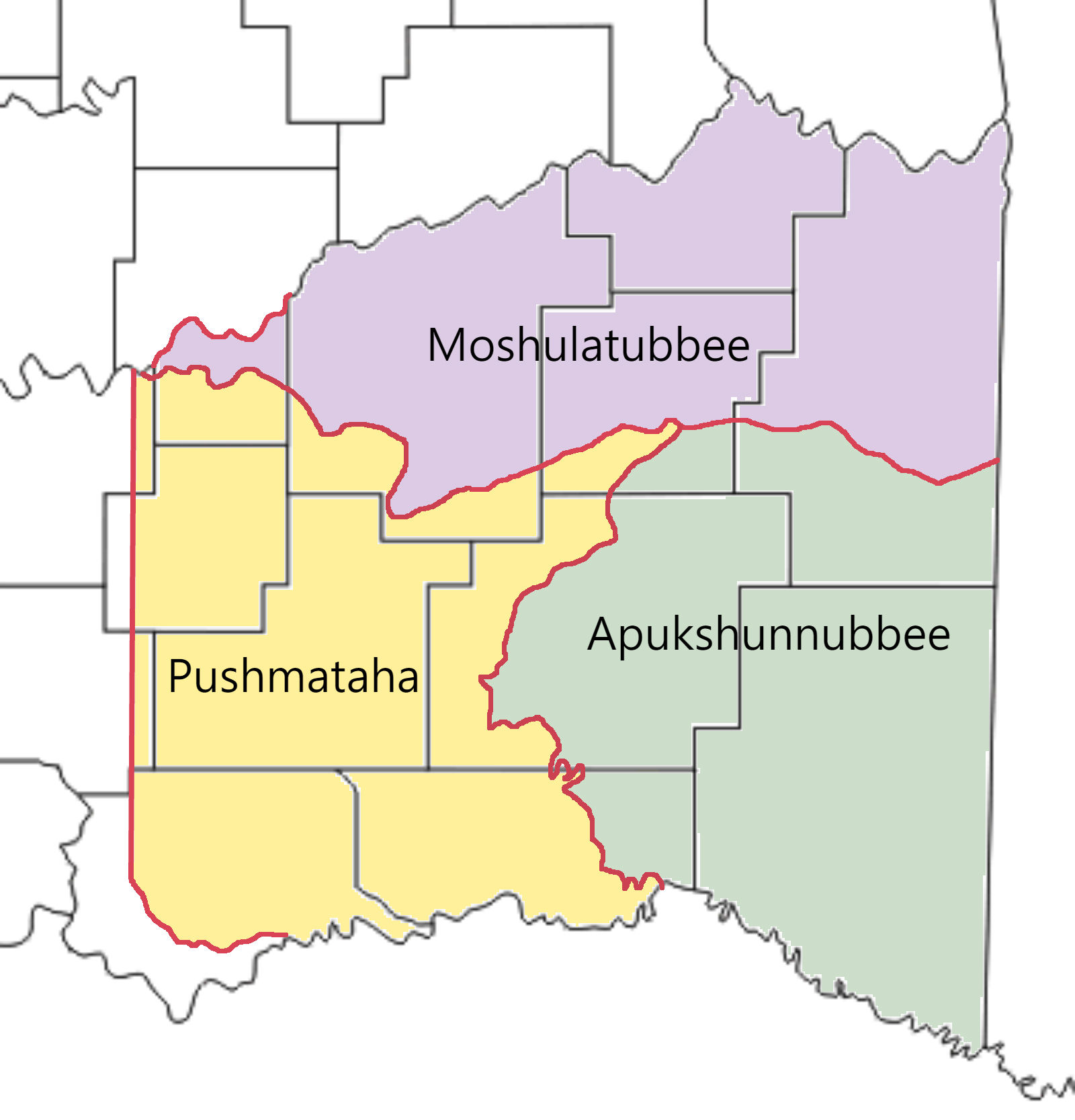
Pushmataha District covered the southwestern one-third of the Choctaw Nation.

The territory of the former Pushmataha District is incorporated into the present-day Oklahoma counties of Atoka, Bryan, Choctaw, Coal, and Pushmataha.
