= Cyrus Kingsbury =

American Christian missionary and minister

- Born: November 22, 1786; Alstead, Cheshire County, New Hampshire, US
- Died: June 27, 1870 (aged 83); Choctaw Nation, Indian Territory (now Oklahoma)
- Other names: "Apostle to the Choctaws" "Father of the Choctaw Missions"; NachobaAnowa (Choctaw for "Limping Wolf"
- Occupations: Minister, Missionary
- Years active: 1817-1870

Cyrus Kingsbury (November 22, 1786 – June 27, 1870) was a Christian missionary active among Native Americans in the nineteenth century. He first worked with the Cherokee and founded Brainerd Mission near Chickamauga, Tennessee, later he served the Choctaw of Mississippi. He was known as "the Father of the Missions" in Indian Territory.

== Early life ==
Kingsbury was born in Alstead, New Hampshire on November 22, 1786. He was raised in Worcester, Massachusetts by an aunt and uncle. In 1812, he graduated from Brown University with a bachelor's degree. (Note: Cyrus was listed as "Teacher of Penmanship" at Phillips Academy in 1814. He was identified as the son of Col. Cyrus Kingsbury and Annis Tayster.) He then studied at Andover Theological Seminary, where he also graduated in 1815. Choosing to become a missionary to American Indians, he was hired as the first missionary by the American Board of Commissioners for Foreign Missions (ABCFM). (Note: The ABCFM included both Congregational and Presbyterian missions and missionaries. Theologically, the two denominations have been very close (descended from Calvinistic doctrines). Hence, some sources identify Kingsbury as a Congregational minister while others call him a Presbyterian minister. Likewise, missions, schools and churches sponsored by the ABCFM may be indicated as founded by either denomination.)

== Starting a career as missionary ==
Kingsbury was ordained by the Congregational Church in Ipswich, Massachusetts in 1815. He was first sent to Tennessee in 1817, where he began ministering to the Cherokee tribe and founded Brainerd Mission near Chickamauga. (Note: A community by this name does not exist in Tennessee now. This location probably refers to the principal town of the Chickamauga band of Cherokees, which once existed near the present site of Chickamauga Dam, just north of the present city of Chattanooga, Tennessee. The town's inhabitants were probably expelled at the time of the Trail of Tears. Any remaining traces of the town would have been submerged when Chickamauga Reservoir was created in 1940.) According to A. C. Varnum, Brainerd included not only the mission itself, but also a boarding school and an agricultural school.

== Marriage and family ==
Sarah B. Varnum, born in Dracut, Massachusetts on January 16, 1784, was one of ten children of Parker and Dorcas (née Brown) Varnum. Her father would become an elder in the Pawtucket Congregational Church. It is not clear when and how she would meet Cyrus Kingsbury, but evidently the event occurred and a strong attraction ensued. By 1818, when Kingston was preparing to start building with the Choctaws in Mississippi, he had proposed to marry her. Although he wanted to return to New England for the wedding, the church would not allow him to leave his post in Mississippi for a long enough time. Sarah and Cyrus were determined not to wait, but decided to meet in New Orleans. Sarah made the long, arduous ocean voyage unaccompanied from her parental home, while Cyrus came from Tennessee on horseback. They were married in New Orleans on Christmas Eve, 1818. After the ceremony, Cyrus and Sarah made the 200 miles (320 km) trip back to Brainerd on horseback, spending their nights camping out and cooking their food over open fires.

== Ministry in Mississippi ==
In 1818, Kingsbury was sent to Mississippi by the American Board of Commissioners for Foreign Missions and assigned to minister to the Choctaw Nation that lived there. His first activity was to establish Eliot Mission. (Note: This mission was named for David Eliot (sometimes written as Elliott), an early Congregationalist minister, who had begun serving Indians living in Massachusetts in 1676.) Kingsbury selected a site on the Yazoo River, about 400 miles (640 km) southwest of Brainerd.

During childhood, Cyrus had injured a foot when he stepped on a scythe. The injury never healed properly, causing him to walk with a noticeable limp for the rest of his life. Soon after he took up residence in the Choctaw Nation, the tribe gave him a Choctaw name, NachobaAnowa, that meant "Limping Wolf" in English.

=== Mayhew Mission ===
In 1820, Kingsbury chose a location in the northeastern part of present-day Oktibbeha County, Mississippi that he deemed a suitable site for another mission. He described the location as, "... a point where the Ash Creek flows into the Tibbee Creek.” Cyrus named the site Mayhew, in honor of the Mayhew family, another missionary family from Massachusetts. The Kingsburys, assisted by some other families and three unmarried women, started by building a boarding school, where they taught the Choctaws living around the mission to read, write, study the Bible and other subjects related to earning a living. The school opened on April 30, 1820, with twelve students who lived nearby. Enrollment increased soon to 18, with new students who came from elsewhere in the Choctaw Nation. A church building opened May 6, 1821, and became affiliated with the Tombigbee Presbytery of the Presbyterian Church.

Kingsbury's influence on the Choctaw Nation could be described as spectacular. For example, the Choctaw chiefs began to solicit his advice on how to deal with officials of the Federal Government. They specifically asked him to accompany their delegation to negotiate the 1820 Treaty of Doak's Stand. He did so, and was soon appalled at the U. S. commissioners negotiating tactics, calling the discussions, "Whiskey Negotiations." Kingsbury counseled the Choctaws to cease further negotiations until the commissioners stopped plying the Choctaws with liquor. The Choctaws did so, and the result was a more favorable outcome for the tribe.

Meanwhile, Sarah Kingsbury bore two children, Cyrus and John P. Sarah contracted an unidentified illness and died at the mission five days later, on September 15, 1822. Sarah was buried in the mission cemetery, and Cyrus and the boys lived at the mission for a few more years. When the boys were old enough to go to school, Cyrus sent them back East to be educated. (Note: Sarah's father, John Varnum, had become wealthy and left enough money to send both boys to a college in Ohio. Cyrus chose to become a doctor and majored in medicine. John P. became a businessman, who would return to Indian Territory as a merchant, and also edited a newspaper, the Choctaw Intelligencer, that was printed in both English and Cherokee.) In 1824, Cyrus married Electa May. Well-suited to working as his partner as a missionary, she also saw to the raising of Cyrus' sons. Electa served with him until she died in July 1864. Work continued on the mission, and by 1831, it included a gristmill, a blacksmith shop and a farm. In that year, the Choctaws at Mayhew Mission began their arduous trek to their new homeland in Indian Territory. Cyrus Kingsbury chose to accompany them all the way. (Note: Mayhew mission was abandoned when the Choctaws left, and remained vacant. The remaining townspeople moved when the Mobile and Ohio Railroad bypassed the community in 1857. Almost nothing except the cemetery and the church remains of the original community.)

Cyrus Kingsbury was one of four Mayhew missionaries credited with founding the First Presbyterian Church of Columbus, Mississippi in May, 1829. The other three were Thomas Archibald, Hilary Patrick and David Wright. Mayhew missionaries served the church until 1834. David Wright became the first permanent minister after the church built a sanctuary and obtained its charter in 1844.

=== Other Choctaw missions in Indian Territory ===
One source has claimed that Cyrus Kingsbury established Pine Ridge Mission in 1818, at a site 1 mile (1.6 km) north of Doaksville, and that the mission became the Choctaw Female Seminary in 1842. (Note: This information conflicts with other sources, especially the Encyclopedia of Oklahoma History and Culture (EOHC).: Kingsbury's first assignment as a missionary was to Brainerd Mission in Tennessee during 1818. He was then sent to Mississippi to live and work among the Choctaws. The area around what would become Doaksville was part of Arkansas Territory, until the U. S. Government changed the boundary between Arkansas Territory and Indian Territory in 1820.; Allen Wright, who would become chief of the Choctaw Nation in 1866, came to Pine Ridge to live with the Kingsburys in 1840.)

Kingsbury has been credited with building the church in the Choctaw town of Boggy Depot in 1840.

== Civil War and the Choctaw Missions ==
As political unrest increased throughout the country, officials of the various missionary groups realized that Indian Territory could easily divide over the issue of slavery. Missionaries alerted their sponsors that the major tribes were already redefining their loyalties.

== Honors ==
Kingsbury was awarded an honorary Doctor of Divinity (D.D.) degree by Brown University in 1854.

== Death ==
Cyrus Kingsbury died June 27, 1870.

== Legacy ==
Cyrus Kingsbury's papers are in the Western History Collection at the University of Oklahoma library. A listing of the contents of the ten folders is available online.
