= Atoka, Oklahoma =

City in Oklahoma, US

- City
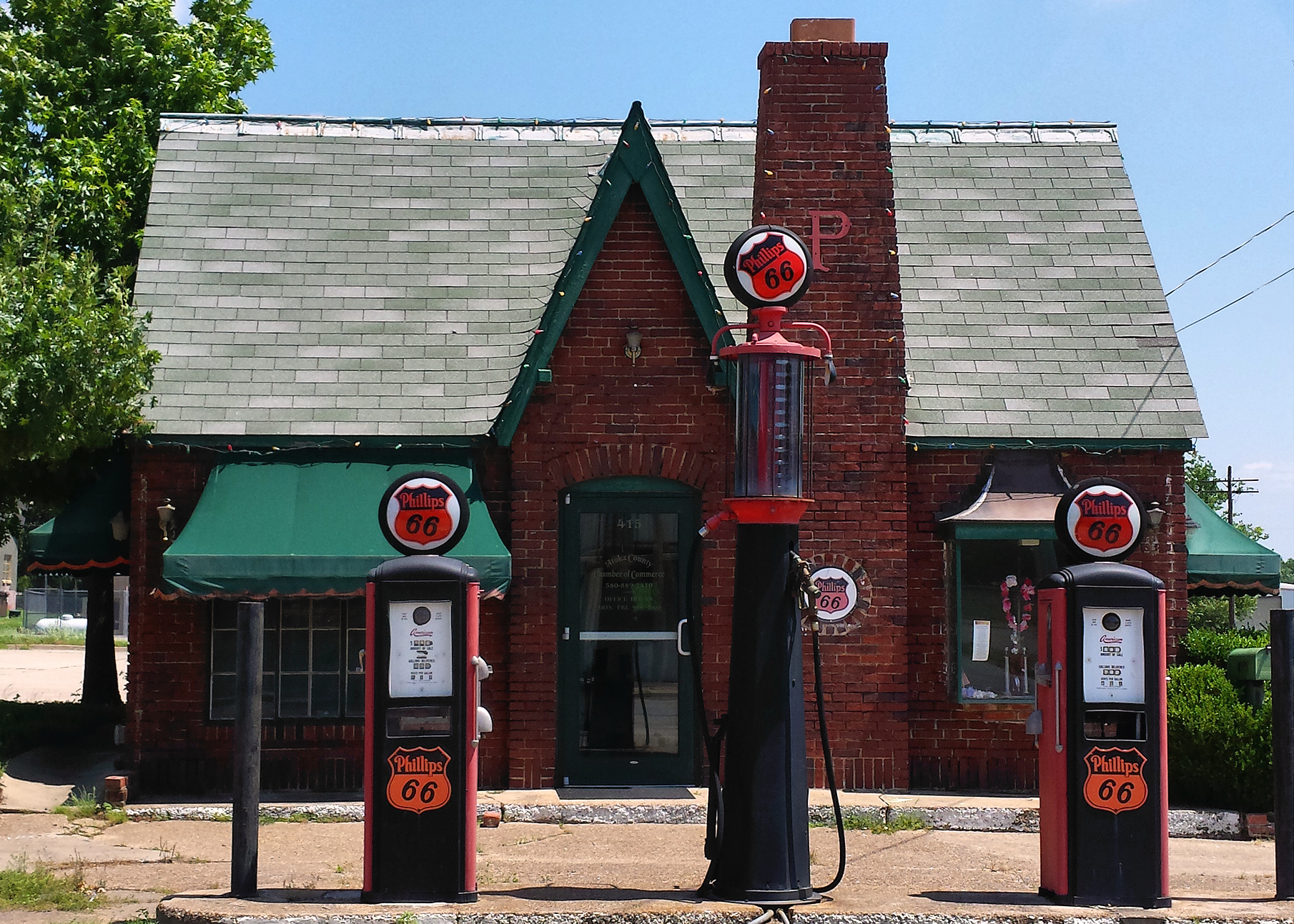
- The Atoka County Chamber of Commerce Building in Atoka.

- Logo
- Motto: "A City Committed to the Future"
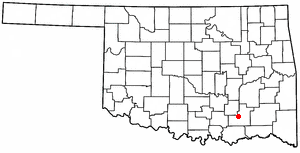
- Location of Atoka, Oklahoma
- Coordinates: 34°23′3″N 96°7′39″W
- Country: United States
- State: Oklahoma
- County: Atoka
- Established: 1867

Government
  - Mayor: Brian Cathey

Area
  - Total: 8.40 sq mi (21.75 km^{2})
  - Land: 8.23 sq mi (21.31 km^{2})
  - Water: 0.17 sq mi (0.44 km^{2})
- Elevation: 581 ft (177 m)

Population (2020)
  - Total: 3,195
  - Density: 388.4/sq mi (149.96/km^{2})
- Time zone: UTC-6 (CST)
  - Summer (DST): UTC-5 (CDT)
- ZIP codes: 74525, 74542
- Area code: 580
- FIPS code: 40-03300
- GNIS feature ID: 1089746
- Website: www.atokaok.org

Atoka is a city in and the county seat of Atoka County, Oklahoma, United States. The population was 3,195 as of the 2020 Census, a 2.4% increase over the 3,107 reported at the 2010 census, which was itself an increase of 4.0 percent from the figure of 2,988 in 2000.

The city was settled by the Choctaw and named in 1867 by a Baptist missionary for Chief Atoka, whose name means "ball ground" in English.

== History ==
Atoka was founded by the Choctaw Indians in the 1850s, and named for Captain Atoka, a leader of the Choctaw Nation and the signatory of the Treaty of Dancing Rabbit Creek, which began the process of re-locating the Choctaw people from Mississippi to Oklahoma in 1830. The name "Atoka" is derived from the Choctaw word hitoka (or hetoka), which means "ball ground" in English. He is believed to be buried near the town of Farris. Atoka is the site of the oldest Catholic parish in the Indian Territory, the oldest chapter of the Freemasons in Oklahoma, and the oldest chapter of the Order of the Eastern Star in Oklahoma.

=== Battle of Middle Boggy Depot ===
A small Civil War confrontation occurred on February 13, 1864, north of Atoka. Early in 1864, Colonel William A. Philips set out with some 1,500 Union troops from Fort Gibson, Oklahoma, to cut a swath through Confederate Indian Territory (Oklahoma). Their purpose was to break Confederate control over the Indian Territory and gain the support and possibly recruits from the Native Americans.

"I take you with me to clean out the Indian Nation south of the river and drive away and destroy rebels. Let me say a few words to you that you are not to forget .... Those who are still in arms are rebels, who ought to die. Do not kill a prisoner after he has surrendered. But I do not ask you to take prisoners. I ask you to make your footsteps severe and terrible. Muskogees! (Creeks) the time has now come when you are to remember the authors of all your sufferings; those who started a needless and wicked war .... Stand by me faithfully and we will soon have peace ...." -- Colonel William A. Philips, to his men before beginning the campaign

Along the way, Colonel Phillips sent out an advance of about 350 men toward Boggy Depot, a large Confederate supply base located on the Texas Road with the intention of capturing the outpost. While en route, his command encountered a small Confederate camp on the banks of the Middle Boggy River, made up of around 90 Confederate soldiers.

In the ensuing skirmish 47 Confederate soldiers were killed. Among the dead were those wounded who had been left behind when their comrades retreated. They were found on the battlefield with their throats slashed. There were no Union deaths as a result of the battle.

The Confederate Museum in Atoka (since 2016 the Atoka Museum) commemorates this battle.

=== Founding ===
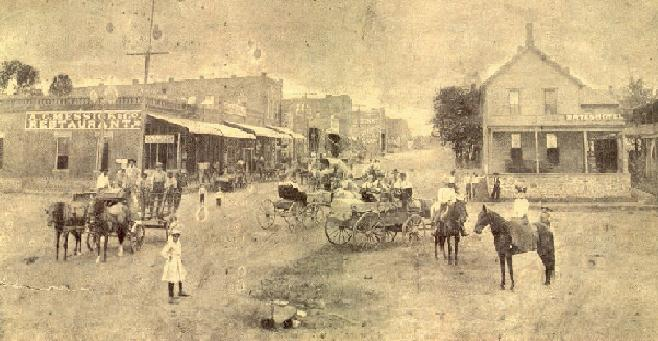
An early, turn-of-the-century photograph of Court Street in Atoka

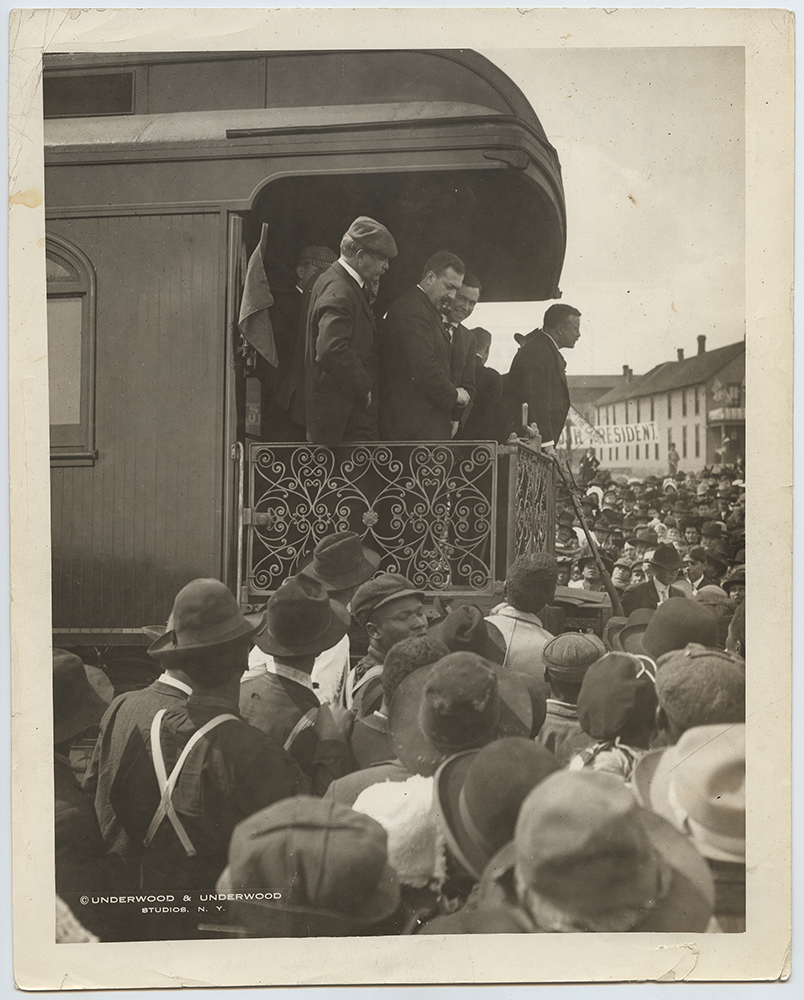
Theodore Roosevelt spoke briefly in Atoka (then part of the Choctaw Nation) in April 1905

Though the Choctaw Indians had inhabited the area since the 1830s with a small town located near the city today, the city was officially founded by a Baptist missionary named J.S. Murrow in 1867 and quickly supplanted the dying town of Boggy Depot as the chief city in Atoka County, Choctaw Nation, a territorial-era county which included portions of today's Atoka, Coal, Hughes and Pittsburg counties. A main contributing factor in the early growth of Atoka was the MKT Railroad. The MKT's line from Parsons, Kansas to Dallas, Texas was built through Atoka in 1872. A line from Atoka to Oklahoma City (via Coalgate, Ada, and Shawnee) was also built. The railroad provided the economic lifeblood to Atoka that any isolated rural town needs to survive and flourish. Many businesses quickly moved to Atoka from Boggy Depot.

Also in 1872, Father Michael Smyth founded St. Patrick's Catholic Church. This was the first Roman Catholic church in what became the state of Oklahoma. On October 12, 1875, the Sacred Heart Mission, what later became St. Gregory's University, was founded in Atoka by the Benedictine monks Father Isidore Robot, O.S.B., and Brother Dominic Lambert, O.S.B. In 1876, the mission relocated to near Konawa, Oklahoma and became an abbey.

About 1896, Robert L. Williams, who would become the third Governor of Oklahoma and first Chief Justice of the Oklahoma Supreme Court, moved to Atoka (then a part of the old Indian Territory) from Troy, Alabama. In 1898, land allotments were implemented and town lots were sold, as required by the Dawes Commission.

=== Recent developments ===
Despite being strategically located at the intersection of two major highways (especially U.S. 69, a major transportation artery in the region), Atoka is struggling to create a town attractive to both new business and new residents. Even though the town has experienced an economic upturn in the past few years, it still lacks the main thing that ensures economic prosperity and attracts new residents: well-paying jobs.

However, there is a beacon of hope for Atoka in the future. For the past several years, economic growth has been steadily moving northward along U.S. 75 from Dallas, Texas. Two towns located to the south of Atoka, Durant, Oklahoma, and Sherman, Texas, are experiencing tremendous economic and population growth. As this wave of development gradually moves north, the next town in line is the city of Atoka. If the growth continues, it is possible that Atoka could begin to see the type of expansion currently underway across the Red River to the south.

In 2023, Reba McEntire partnered with the Choctaw Nation and the city of Atoka to open a restaurant called Reba's Place in downtown Atoka. The restaurant has increased tourism in the Atoka area and is helping to spark economic growth.

=== NRHP sites ===
Twelve of the 17 current National Register of Historic Places sites in Atoka County are in the city of Atoka:

- Atoka Armory
- Boggy Depot Site
- First Methodist Church Building
- Indian Citizen Building
- Masonic Temple
- Middle Boggy Battlefield Site and Confederate Cemetery
- Old Atoka County Courthouse
- Old Atoka State Bank
- Pioneer Club
- Joe Ralls House
- Captain James S. Standley House
- Zweigel Hardware Store Building

== Geography ==
Atoka is located at 34°23′3″N 96°7′39″W (34.384206, -96.127577). According to the United States Census Bureau, the city has a total area of 8.5 square miles (22.1 km^{2}), of which 8.3 square miles (21.6 km^{2}) is land and 0.15 square miles (0.4 km^{2}), or 2.00%, is water.

=== Climate ===
Climate data for Atoka, Oklahoma
Month	Jan	Feb	Mar	Apr	May	Jun	Jul	Aug	Sep	Oct	Nov	Dec	Year
Mean daily maximum °F (°C)	51.2 (10.7)	56.0 (13.3)	64.6 (18.1)	72.7 (22.6)	79.6 (26.4)	88.4 (31.3)	94.0 (34.4)	94.5 (34.7)	87.0 (30.6)	75.7 (24.3)	62.9 (17.2)	54.0 (12.2)	73.4 (23.0)
Daily mean °F (°C)	39.3 (4.1)	43.9 (6.6)	52.3 (11.3)	60.4 (15.8)	69.1 (20.6)	77.8 (25.4)	82.4 (28.0)	82.0 (27.8)	74.4 (23.6)	62.6 (17.0)	50.6 (10.3)	42.0 (5.6)	61.4 (16.3)
Mean daily minimum °F (°C)	27.5 (−2.5)	31.8 (−0.1)	40.0 (4.4)	48.0 (8.9)	58.7 (14.8)	67.2 (19.6)	70.7 (21.5)	69.5 (20.8)	61.9 (16.6)	49.5 (9.7)	38.4 (3.6)	30.1 (−1.1)	49.4 (9.7)
Average precipitation inches (mm)	2.08 (53)	2.51 (64)	3.81 (97)	4.09 (104)	6.96 (177)	4.77 (121)	3.18 (81)	3.17 (81)	4.16 (106)	4.30 (109)	3.16 (80)	3.49 (89)	45.68 (1,162)
Source: NOAA

== Demographics ==
Historical population
Census	Pop.	Note	%±
1910	1,968		—
1920	2,038		3.6%
1930	1,856		−8.9%
1940	2,548		37.3%
1950	2,653		4.1%
1960	2,877		8.4%
1970	3,346		16.3%
1980	3,409		1.9%
1990	3,298		−3.3%
2000	2,988		−9.4%
2010	3,107		4.0%
2020	3,195		2.8%
U.S. Decennial Census

=== 2020 census ===
As of the 2020 census, Atoka had a population of 3,195. The median age was 39.4 years. 21.7% of residents were under the age of 18 and 19.2% of residents were 65 years of age or older. For every 100 females there were 109.5 males, and for every 100 females age 18 and over there were 107.8 males age 18 and over.

All residents lived in rural areas.

There were 1,161 households in Atoka, of which 29.8% had children under the age of 18 living in them. Of all households, 32.7% were married-couple households, 20.0% were households with a male householder and no spouse or partner present, and 40.1% were households with a female householder and no spouse or partner present. About 38.0% of all households were made up of individuals and 20.7% had someone living alone who was 65 years of age or older.

There were 1,441 housing units, of which 19.4% were vacant. Among occupied housing units, 51.3% were owner-occupied and 48.7% were renter-occupied. The homeowner vacancy rate was 4.3% and the rental vacancy rate was 19.6%.

Racial composition as of the 2020 census
Race	Percent
White	60.8%
Black or African American	7.9%
American Indian and Alaska Native	15.0%
Asian	1.2%
Native Hawaiian and Other Pacific Islander	0.1%
Some other race	2.6%
Two or more races	12.5%
Hispanic or Latino (of any race)	5.9%

=== 2010 census ===
As of the census of 2010, there were 3,107 people living in the city. The population density was 354.7 inhabitants per square mile (137.0/km^{2}). There were 1,499 housing units at an average density of 178.0 per square mile (68.7/km^{2}). The racial makeup of the city was 72.86% White, 11.51% African American, 10.27% Native American, 0.27% Asian, 0.10% from other races, and 4.99% from two or more races. Hispanic or Latino of any race were 0.90% of the population.

There were 1,277 households, out of which 26.4% had children under the age of 18 living with them, 38.9% were married couples living together, 15.0% had a female householder with no husband present, and 42.4% were non-families. 39.2% of all households were made up of individuals, and 21.3% had someone living alone who was 65 years of age or older. The average household size was 2.22 and the average family size was 2.99.

In the city, the population was spread out, with 24.5% under the age of 18, 8.6% from 18 to 24, 22.4% from 25 to 44, 22.5% from 45 to 64, and 22.1% who were 65 years of age or older. The median age was 41 years. For every 100 females, there were 78.6 males. For every 100 females age 18 and over, there were 74.2 males.

The median income for a household in the city was $18,361, and the median income for a family was $22,344. Males had a median income of $25,431 versus $19,495 for females. The per capita income for the city was $12,017. About 19.1% of families and 25.3% of the population were below the poverty line, including 34.9% of those under age 18 and 17.8% of those age 65 or over.

== Government and politics ==
=== Municipal government ===
The city of Atoka operates under a home-rule charter with a council-manager form of government. The Atoka City Council has five elected members, which include the Mayor and Vice Mayor.

The office of Mayor of Atoka is largely a ceremonial position, as most executive authority is held by the city manager, who acts on behalf of the council.

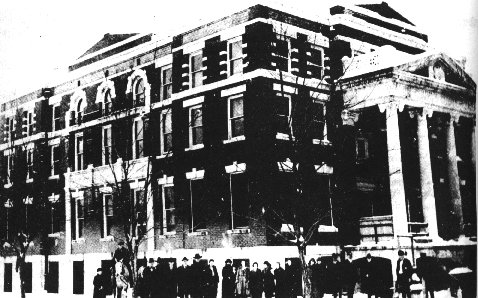
Atoka County's original courthouse, which was torn down in favor of a more modern structure in 1962

=== County judicial system ===
Being the county seat of Atoka County, Atoka is the center of the county judicial system. The courthouse is located on Court Street, and the building has served as such since 1963 when it replaced the old courthouse. The District Judges are Preston Harbuck and Paula Inge.

=== City judicial system ===
The city judge is David Youngblood, and the city attorney is Erik Johnson.

=== State and national government ===
Atoka is included in Oklahoma's 2nd congressional district, of which Josh Breechen is the representative. The city is also included in State House District 22 and State Senate District 6, from which State Representative Charles McCall and Senator George Burns currently serve in the state legislature.

For further details, refer to the Oklahoma State Election Board's Election Results and Statistics

== Economy ==
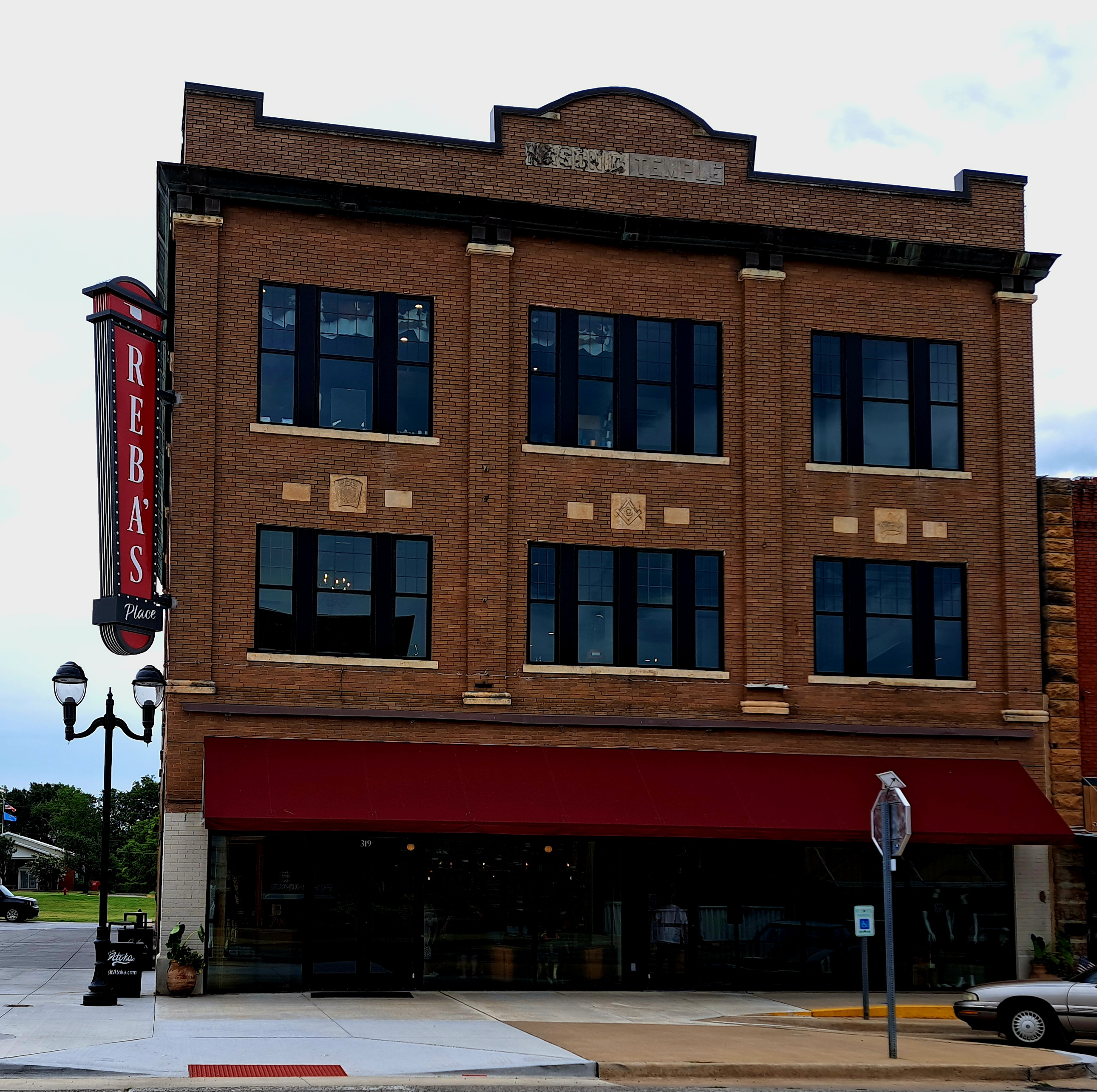
Reba's Place Restaurant in Atoka opened in 2023 and has increased tourism in the area.

In the 19th century, the economy of Atoka and the surrounding area was founded on wood products. There were rich stands of hardwood nearby and ample water from Boggy River to power sawmills. The railroad facilitated shipment of the products.

In the early 20th century, Atoka became a ranching and farming community, with its economic base firmly planted in agriculturally related venues. However, in recent years, efforts have been made by the Chamber of Commerce, the city council, and various other local leaders to create new industrial jobs in Atoka and Atoka County. Currently, an industrial park is open for development north of the city on U.S. Highway 69, as well as a smaller park on U.S. Highway 75, west of town.

In August 2006, the city's largest employer, Ethan Allen Furniture, announced that it would be closing its Atoka plant in favor of "selected off-shore vendors", as reported in The Oklahoman following the announcement of the plant's closing. With the closure of the Ethan Allen plant, located north of the city proper, more than two hundred people lost their jobs (many of whom had held them since the plant opened). As of May 2007, Ethan Allen has resumed operations at the Atoka plant, converting the former manufacturing facility to a distribution center.

In addition to revenue generated at convenience stores, fast food restaurants, etc., Atoka (and Atoka County) is a popular hunting and fishing area; as well, scenic tourism plays a small, albeit important role in the city's economy. An effort is currently underway to place Atoka along a scenic byway.

== Transportation ==
Four highways intersect in Atoka: U.S. Route 69 (a major transportation artery that travels from Texas to Minnesota), State Highway 3, State Highway 7, and U.S. Highway 75, thus making it a convenient stop for motorists. It is located where U.S. 69 and U.S. 75 converge (heading south toward Texoma).

Atoka Municipal Airport (KAQR, or FAA ID: AQR), located 1 mile northwest of town, has a 3015’ x 60’ paved runway.

For commercial air transportation, Atoka is roughly equidistant from Dallas/Fort Worth International Airport (130 miles south-southwest), Will Rogers World Airport (137 miles northwest), and Tulsa International Airport (140 miles north).

== Media ==
Atoka is served by several media outlets, including the Atoka County Times, published weekly on Wednesdays, 102.1 KHKC, a radio station headquartered on the county line between Atoka and Coal counties, and KXII and KTEN, television stations broadcasting from Sherman, Texas.

Tradio, a locally well-known radio show, is broadcast every weekday morning. Tradio was known for, among many things, its host John Reuben. The show consists of callers advertising items such as cars, furniture and animals, or events such as auctions and garage sales over the air. The tagline for show is, "Good morning, you're on Tradio," which is repeated by Reuben as he answers each call. The current host, Derek Reid, still sometimes answers the phone to people saying "Good Morning Brother John", as a nod to Reuben.

== Education ==
The vast majority of Atoka is in the Atoka Public Schools System, while a portion of the city limits to the south is in the Tushka Public Schools school district.

The Atoka district has students from all over Atoka County due to offering several other academic and extra-curricular activities, such as football, track, robotics, and more.

=== Atoka High School ===
The Atoka High School campus is located on the west side of the town, and enrollment averages between 300 and 400 students from grades 9 to 12. Besides offering the basic courses and several Advanced Placement programs, Atoka High School offers classes in Spanish, Choir, Agricultural Education (FFA), and Drama, among others. The Parliamentary Procedure Team were State Champions in 2005 and National Semi-Finalists in 2007. The Mock Trial team has won the Oklahoma state competition six times. The school also offer sports such as baseball, softball, track and field, football, golf, and powerlifting and have represented Atoka in the state playoffs in many sports. A cafetorium opened in August 2007. With the new cafeteria, the high school is now a closed campus.

=== Junior high and elementary education ===
C.A. "Barney" McCall Junior High School is located due south of the high school campus. The junior high school averages between 200 and 250 in enrollment. The Atoka Elementary School is located north of the high school. All three schools are now located in one spot.

=== Higher education ===
Atoka is served by Kiamichi Technology Center. The Atoka campus offers courses in Business Information Technology, Computer Repair & Networking, Cosmetology, Child Care, Nursing, Auto Mechanics, and Carpentry.

== Notable people ==
- Jim Barnes, Oklahoma Poet Laureate for 2009 and 2010 and author of nine books of poetry
- Todd Downing (writer), novelist.
- Lane Frost, professional bull rider. Attended high school in Atoka.
- Lowell Fulson, blues musician
- Charles McCall, Speaker of the Oklahoma State House of Representatives
- Reba McEntire, country music artist
- J. Vernon McGee was raised in Atoka; founder of Thru The Bible Radio, Pasadena, California.
- Matthew Mungle, winner of an Academy Award for Makeup and four-time Emmy Award winner
- Crystal Robinson, WNBA player for the Washington Mystics and New York Liberty
- U. L. Washington, former MLB player for the Kansas City Royals, Montreal Expos, and Pittsburgh Pirates
