= National Register of Historic Places listings in Haskell County, Oklahoma =

Location of Haskell County in Oklahoma

This is a list of the National Register of Historic Places listings in Haskell County, Oklahoma.

This is intended to be a complete list of the properties on the National Register of Historic Places in Haskell County, Oklahoma, United States. The locations of National Register properties for which the latitude and longitude coordinates are included below, may be seen in a map.

There are 10 properties listed on the National Register in the county.

This National Park Service list is complete through NPS recent listings posted March 27, 2026.

== Current listings ==
	Name on the Register	Image	Date listed	Location	City or town	Description
1	Cotton Storage House		January 10, 1980 (#80003263)	Off State Highway 2; 35°07′08″N 95°13′57″W	Kinta	
2	Haskell County Courthouse	Haskell County Courthouse	August 23, 1984 (#84003061)	202 E. Main St. 35°15′14″N 95°04′48″W	Stigler	
3	Kinta High School	Kinta High School	September 26, 1988 (#88001383)	State Highway 2; 35°06′30″N 95°14′15″W	Kinta	
4	Edmund McCurtain House		June 27, 1980 (#80003265)	Northeast of Kinta; 35°07′43″N 95°09′43″W	Kinta	
5	Green McCurtain House	Green McCurtain House	June 21, 1971 (#71000661)	Northeast of Kinta; 35°07′43″N 95°09′25″W	Kinta	
6	Mule Creek Site		September 13, 1978 (#78002237)	Address Restricted	Stigler	
7	Otter Creek Archeological Site		December 31, 1974 (#74001661)	Address Restricted	Keota	
8	Scott Store		January 11, 1980 (#80003264)	State Highway 2; 35°07′04″N 95°13′53″W	Kinta	No longer extant per Google Street View. Some old stone work was incorporated into the new building.
9	Stigler School Gymnasium-Auditorium	Stigler School Gymnasium-Auditorium	September 8, 1988 (#88001384)	4th and E Sts. 35°15′31″N 95°07′40″W	Stigler	
10	Tamaha Jail and Ferry Landing	Tamaha Jail and Ferry Landing	November 14, 1980 (#80003266)	Northeast of Stigler; 35°24′03″N 94°58′42″W	Stigler	

== See also ==
- List of National Historic Landmarks in Oklahoma
- National Register of Historic Places listings in Oklahoma
