= Stigler =

Stigler is a surname. Notable people with the surname include:

- Franz Stigler (1915–2008), Luftwaffe pilot who escorted an American bomber back to safety in 1943
- George Stigler (1911–1991), Nobel Prize–winning U.S. economist, associated with the Stigler Commission and Stigler diet; father of Stephen Stigler
- James W. Stigler, American psychologist, researcher, entrepreneur and author
- Michael Stigler (born 1992), American track and field athlete
- Stephen Stigler (born 1941), professor at the University of Chicago, known for Stigler's law of eponymy; son of George Stigler
- William G. Stigler (1891–1952), American politician in Oklahoma

== Other uses ==
- Stigler, Oklahoma, a city Haskell County
  - Stigler Regional Airport, owned by the city of Stigler
- Stigler Commission, convened in 1961 to study the measurement of inflation in the United States
- Stigler diet, an optimization problem regarding recommended dietary allowances (RDAs)
- Stigler's law of eponymy, which states that no scientific discovery is named after its original discoverer
  - List of examples of Stigler's law

== See also ==
- Stiegler, a surname
- Stig (disambiguation)
