= Stig =

Stig or STIG may refer to:

== People ==
- Stig (given name)
- Nickname of Robert Stigwood (1934–2016), musical act manager

== Arts and entertainment ==
- The Stig, a masked racing driver on the UK television show Top Gear
- Stig (singer), Finnish performer Pasi Siitonen
- Stig, the title character of Stig of the Dump, a children's book and two TV series
- Stig, the title character of Stig's Inferno, a comic by Ty Templeton
- Stig, a "member" of the fictional (later real) band the Rutles, a parody of the Beatles

== Technology ==
- Security Technical Implementation Guide, a computing security methodology
- Steam-injected gas turbine, an energy production technology; See Cheng cycle
- Stig pod, electronic cigarette brand

== Other uses ==
- Stig (Serbia), a region in eastern Serbia

== See also ==
- Stian, a related Scandinavian name
- Stigg of the Dump, an underground hip hop producer in Canada
- Stigler, a surname
