= Hoyt, Oklahoma =

- Census-designated place
- Location within Oklahoma Location within the United States
- Coordinates: 35°16′05″N 95°18′01″W
- Country: United States
- State: Oklahoma
- County: Haskell

Area
  - Total: 0.97 sq mi (2.52 km^{2})
  - Land: 0.97 sq mi (2.52 km^{2})
  - Water: 0.0039 sq mi (0.01 km^{2})
- Elevation: 568 ft (173 m)

Population (2020)
  - Total: 82
  - Density: 84/sq mi (32.6/km^{2})
- Time zone: UTC-6 (Central (CST))
  - Summer (DST): UTC-5 (CDT)
- ZIP code: 74440
- Area codes: 918 & 539
- GNIS feature ID: 2629922

Hoyt is an unincorporated community and census-designated place (CDP) in Haskell County, Oklahoma, United States. The community is 3.9 miles (6.3 km) west-northwest of Whitefield. A post office was established at Hoyt, Indian Territory on August 19, 1890. It was named for Babe Hoyt, a local ferryboat operator. The post office closed on April 17, 2004; it still has its own ZIP code, 74440.

As of the 2020 census, Hoyt had a population of 82.

It is home to the Hoyt School, which is no longer in use, but has been nominated for classification as an official Oklahoma landmark.

At the time of its founding, Hoyt was located in the Moshulatubbee District of the Choctaw Nation.

== Demographics ==
Historical population
Census	Pop.	Note	%±
2020	82		—
U.S. Decennial Census

=== 2020 census ===
As of the 2020 census, Hoyt had a population of 82. The median age was 45.0 years. 12.2% of residents were under the age of 18 and 34.1% of residents were 65 years of age or older. For every 100 females there were 121.6 males, and for every 100 females age 18 and over there were 118.2 males age 18 and over.

0.0% of residents lived in urban areas, while 100.0% lived in rural areas.

There were 29 households in Hoyt, of which 20.7% had children under the age of 18 living in them. Of all households, 82.8% were married-couple households, 3.4% were households with a male householder and no spouse or partner present, and 3.4% were households with a female householder and no spouse or partner present. About 0.0% of all households were made up of individuals and 0.0% had someone living alone who was 65 years of age or older.

There were 43 housing units, of which 32.6% were vacant. The homeowner vacancy rate was 0.0% and the rental vacancy rate was 42.9%.

Racial composition as of the 2020 census
Race	Number	Percent
White	64	78.0%
Black or African American	0	0.0%
American Indian and Alaska Native	12	14.6%
Asian	0	0.0%
Native Hawaiian and Other Pacific Islander	0	0.0%
Some other race	2	2.4%
Two or more races	4	4.9%
Hispanic or Latino (of any race)	2	2.4%
