= Ian Purkayastha =

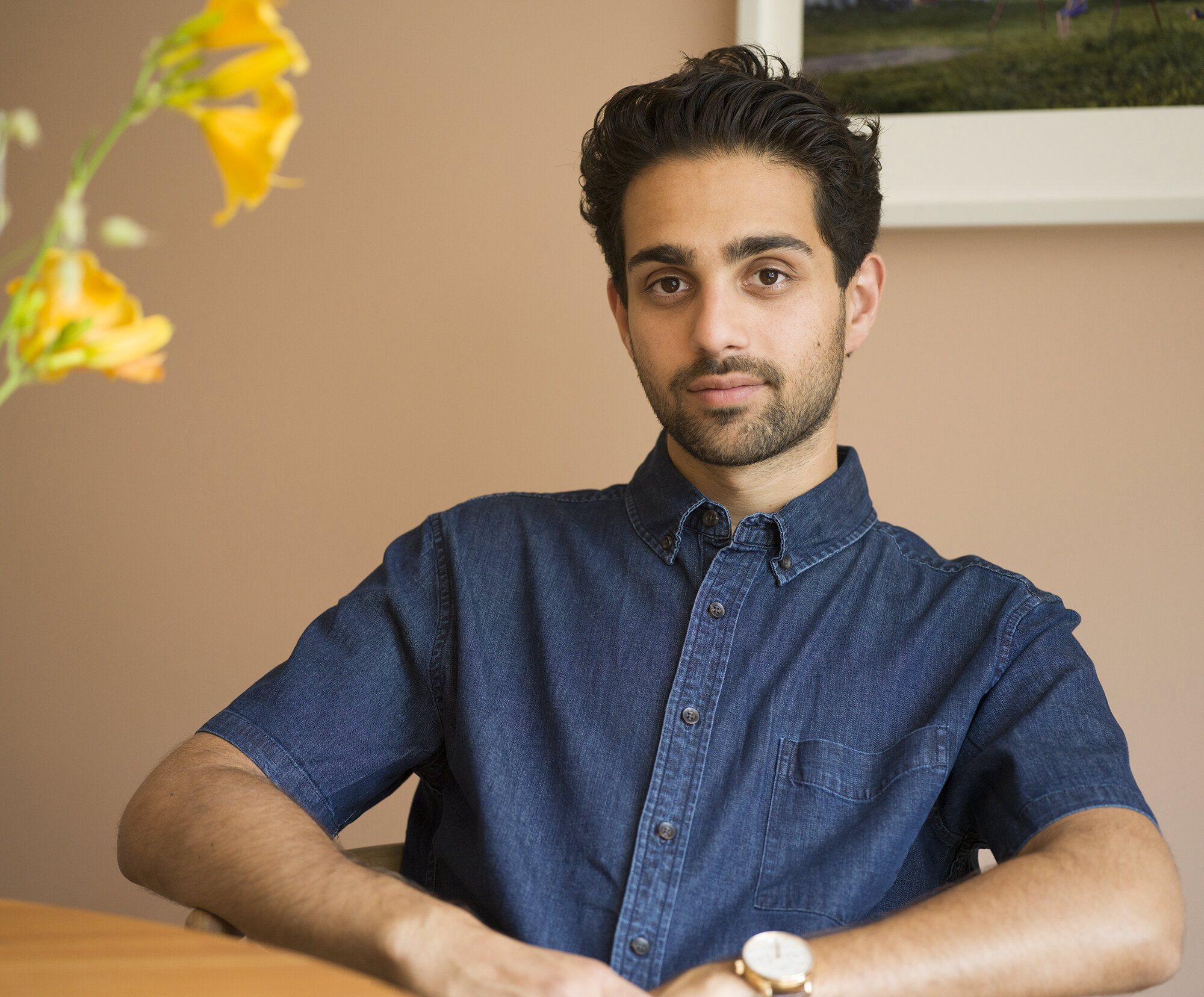
- Born: August 30, 1992 (age 33); Houston, Texas
- Website: ianpurkayastha.com

Ian Purkayastha (born 1992) is an American entrepreneur, best known as the founder of Regalis Foods—a specialty ingredients company supplying truffles, caviar, and other rare products to chefs and restaurants across the United States. He is the author of Truffle Boy: My Unexpected Journey Through the Exotic Food Underground (Hachette Books, 2017).

== Life and career ==
Purkayastha was born in Houston, Texas, and raised in Fayetteville, Arkansas. His father emigrated from Tamil Nadu, India, and his mother, of Native American Choctaw descent, is from Texas. Ian is the grandson of notable artist and sculptor Charles Pebworth and the nephew of Charles's daughter, Alison Pebworth. From a young age, he nurtured a fascination with rare and precious objects: at ten, he joined the Houston Gem and Mineral Society, learned to facet stones, and even purchased a small parcel of diamonds wholesale at the diamond market in Mumbai. As a teenager, he began foraging for wild mushrooms and edible greens with his uncle in the Ozarks, and a chance encounter with imported truffles carried that instinct for the rare into the culinary world. Later, Ian would describe hunting and selling truffles as a tactile and intuitive outlet—not unlike working with stones. Before even finishing high school, he was already providing chefs at local restaurants with his finds, running deliveries out of his parents’ car and hosting rare foods parties with friends from school.

At age fifteen, Purkayastha expanded his operation with a small foraging and import business that sold wild mushrooms and truffles to restaurants across Arkansas, Oklahoma, and Texas. In 2009, while still in high school, he joined an Italian truffle importer in New Jersey as their regional sales director, gaining experience in international sourcing and restaurant distribution. Two years later, at age 19, he founded Regalis Foods in New York City, beginning with truffles and expanding to include caviar, uni, wild seafood, edible flowers, and other rare ingredients. His operation quickly gained a following among high-end chefs, with media outlets calling him “the truffle boy from Arkansas.”

== Regalis Foods ==
Based in New York, Regalis Foods grew from a one-man truffle venture into a multi-city distribution network with offices in Chicago and Dallas.
