= Purkayastha (surname) =

Indian surname

Origin
- Origin: Bengali Hindu
- Region of origin: Bengal

Purkayastha is a Bengali surname which is more prevalent among the Bengali Hindus of Bengal and Assam. The surname is found among Bengali Kayastha, as well as among Bengali Brahmins. "Purkayastha" is actually a title rather than a surname, as "Kayastha" is a term used for "administrator" or "Registrar" and "Pur" signifies an administrative unit such as a city, or town.

== Notable people ==
- Debapratim Purkayastha, Indian educator
- Ian Purkayastha, the founder of Regalis, a New York based luxury foods company
- Kabindra Purkayastha, former union minister of state of India
- Surajit Kar Purkayastha, Indian police officer
- Swarupam Purkayastha, Indian cricketer
