= Stieg =

Stieg is both a surname and a variant of the Scandinavian masculine given name Stig. Notable people with the name include:

Surname

- Philip Stieg (born 1952), American academic physician and neurosurgeon

Given name

- Stieg Hedlund (born 1965), American video game designer, artist and writer
- Stieg Larsson (1954–2004), Swedish journalist and writer
- Stieg Persson (born 1959), Australian contemporary artist
- Stieg Trenter (1914–1967), Swedish journalist writer
