= Operation Billings =

Part of the Vietnam War (1967)

- Part of the Vietnam War
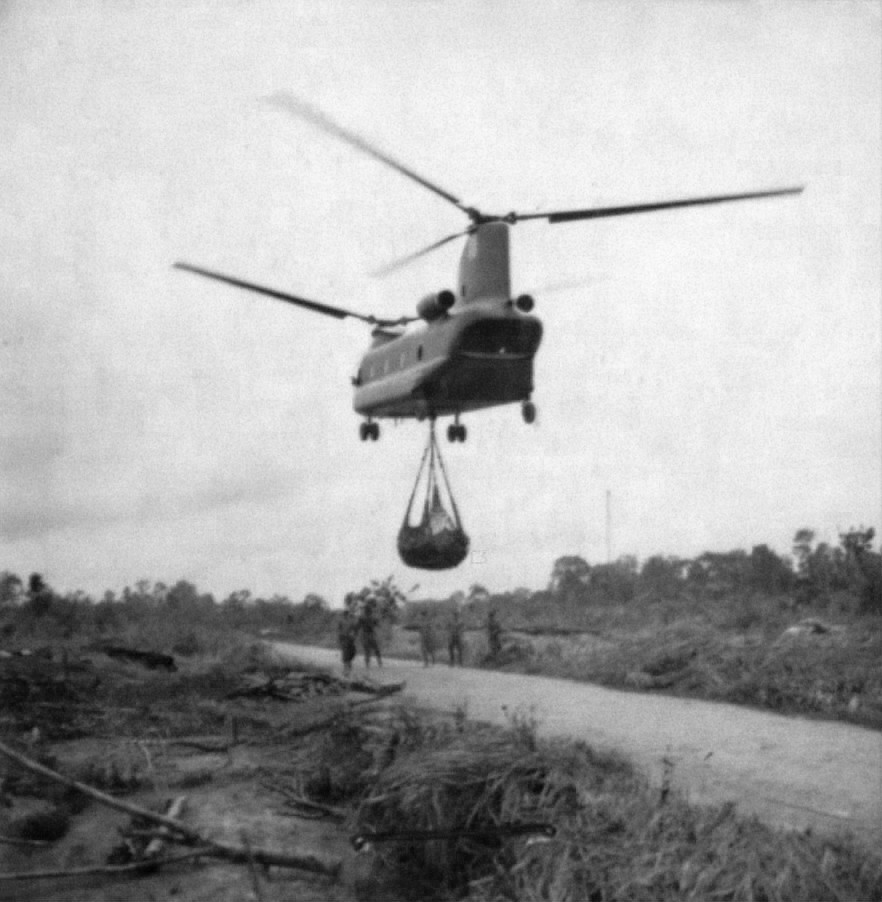
- A CH-47 resupplies the 1st Battalion, 28th Infantry Regiment, 21 June 1967
| Date | 12–26 June 1967 |
| Location | North of Phước Vĩnh, South Vietnam |
| Result | U.S. operational success |

Belligerents
| United States | Viet Cong |

Commanders and leaders
| John H. Hay; Sidney Marks | |

Units involved
| 3rd Brigade, 1st Infantry Division | 271st Regiment, 9th Division |

Casualties and losses
| 57 killed | 347 killed 1 captured |

Operation Billings was a U.S. search and destroy operation conducted by the 3rd Brigade, 1st Infantry Division north of Phước Vĩnh during the Vietnam War. The operation was conducted from 12 to 26 June 1967 and resulted in 347 VC killed and one captured against U.S. losses of 57 killed.

== Background ==
In early June U.S. intelligence learned that the Viet Cong (VC) 271st Regiment, 9th Division was moving into the area north of Phước Vĩnh. 1st Infantry Division commander Major General John H. Hay decided to launch a preemptive attack.

== Operation ==
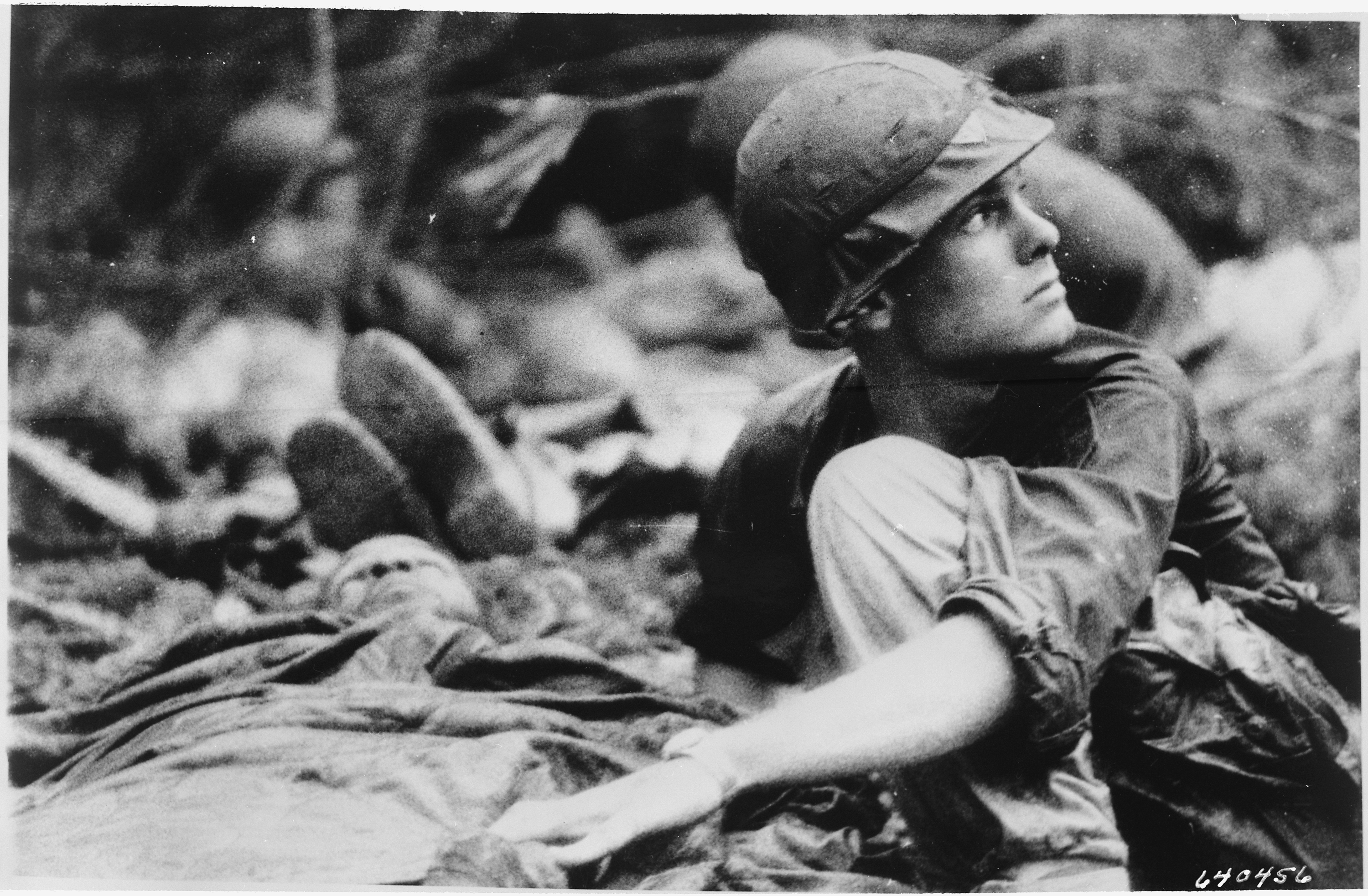
American medic from the 1st Battalion, 16th Infantry looking for a Medevac helicopter

The operation commenced on 12 June as 1st Infantry battalions moved progressively north of Phước Vĩnh. MG Hay came to believe that the 271st had moved to a large clearing designated Landing Zone X-Ray (11.464°N 106.796°E) (a different location from the landing zone of the same name that was the scene of the Battle of Ia Drang), where he suspected that the VC would be preparing to ambush a helicopter landing and so he ordered Colonel Sidney Marks 3rd Brigade to LZ Rufe (11.402°N 106.789°E) and then proceed overland to LZ X-Ray.

On the morning of 17 June, preceded by a moving barrage, the 1st Battalion, 16th Infantry Regiment, entered LZ X-Ray. The 1/16th Infantry established a perimeter 30-50m into the tree line around the clearing and waited for the 2nd Battalion, 28th Infantry Regiment to arrive. As the first units of 2/28th Infantry arrived X-Ray, a patrol reported a group of VC approaching from the northwest. At 13:00, the VC attacked, penetrating the northern and northwestern perimeters before being forced back by artillery and gunship support. The VC then launched a second attack against the southeast perimeter and despite heavy defensive fire overran the defending platoon with the survivors withdrawing into the center of the perimeter to form a new defensive line. At 13:45, air strikes forced the VC to begin to withdraw and they disengaged under cover of a steady mortar barrage.

U.S. losses were 35 killed. A search of the immediate area found 226 VC dead. Over the next few days the Americans found more VC dead, in one assembly area 35 were found killed by artillery and airstrikes. Airstrikes and ambushes were set on the 271st Regiment's likely withdrawal routes, but there was minimal additional contact.

The operation concluded on 26 June 1967. It was considered a success with a total of 347 VC killed and one captured against U.S. losses of 57 killed.

== Sources ==
- Hearne, David and MG Troy Oliver. (November 1, 2016) June 17, 1967: Battle of Xom Bo II. Subterfuge Publishing.
