= KI BOIS Area Transit System =

- Headquarters: 1107 Industrial Road, Stigler, Oklahoma
- Annual ridership: 508,053 (2022)
- Director: Charla Sloan
- Website: Official website

KI BOIS Area Transit System (KATS) is a rural public transportation organization centered mostly in Southeastern Oklahoma, and specifically in the counties of Adair, Cherokee, Haskell, Latimer, LeFlore, McIntosh, Okfuskee, Okmulgee, Pittsburg, Sequoyah, and Wagoner.

It is run by KI BOIS Community Action, Inc., a private, non-profit 501(c) corporation formed in December 1968 by merger of earlier Community Action agencies in Haskell, Latimer, and LeFlore counties. The primary purpose of KATS is to help poorer communities by providing low-cost access to Senior Citizen centers, grocery stores, medical services and jobs. This may include transportation to nearby towns; for instance, available service in Henryetta includes transport to Okmulgee and Tulsa.

KATS’ parent organization is a recipient of Oklahoma Department of Transportation funds under that agency's Title VI Plan, as well as a recipient of support from other governmental entities including the Cherokee Nation and the Muscogee (Creek) Nation. Riders are then charged a minimal fee for the service. KATS not uncommonly receives up to 500 requests for transportation per day.

Despite the name, there is no generally recognized part of Oklahoma known as the "KI BOIS area" or "KiBois area." Southeastern Oklahoma is occasionally still called Little Dixie, while the official tourism designation for Southeastern Oklahoma is Choctaw Country, formerly Kiamichi Country. The title for the agency and transportation system was derived from the names of the two mountain sub-ranges which traverse southeastern Oklahoma, being the Kiamichi Mountains and the Sans Bois Mountains.

== See also ==
- List of bus transit systems in the United States
