= Stian =

Male given name

- Gender: Male
- Language: Norwegian

Origin
- Meaning: Wanderer, swift on his feet

Other names
- Related names: Stig

Stian is a given name for males, originating from Norway. It is the modern form of the Old Norse name Stígandr, which means "wanderer". Another translation given is "swift on his feet".

Another modern derivation of the Old Norse is the name Stig.

Notable men named Stian include:

- Stian Aarstad, pianist
- Stian Arnesen, black metal musician
- Stian Barsnes Simonsen, actor
- Stian Berget, footballer
- Stian Carstensen, jazz and folk musician
- Stian Eckhoff, biathlete
- Stian Grimseth, weightlifter
- Stian Hole, graphic designer and children's author
- Stian Kvarstad, ski jumper
- Stian Lind Halvorsen, football defender
- Stian Kristoffersen, Pagan's Mind drummer
- Stian Ohr, football midfielder
- Stian Ringstad, football defender
- Stian Sivertzen, snowboarder
- Stian Storbukås, politician
- Stian Theting, football defender
- Stian Thoresen, musician
- Stian Vatne, handball player
- Stian Westerhus, jazz guitarist
- Stian Heimlund Skjæveland, figurative painter
