= William G. Stigler =

Native American politician

William Grady Stigler
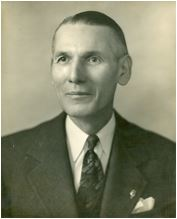

Member of the U.S. House of Representatives from Oklahoma's 2nd district
- In office March 28, 1944 – August 21, 1952
- Preceded by: John C. Nichols
- Succeeded by: Ed Edmondson

Member of the Oklahoma Senate from the 27th district
- In office 1924–1932
- Preceded by: Clark Nichols
- Succeeded by: Joe M. Whitaker

Personal details
- Born: July 7, 1891 Stigler, San Bois County, Indian Territory
- Died: August 21, 1952 (aged 61) Stigler, Haskell County, Oklahoma, U.S.
- Citizenship: American; Choctaw Nation
- Party: Democratic
- Spouse: Ona Beller Stigler
- Children: Denyse Stigler; Elaine Stigler
- Education: Northeastern State College; University of Oklahoma College of Law
- Profession: Attorney

Military service
- Allegiance: United States of America
- Branch/service: United States Army
- Years of service: 1918–1919 (US Army); 1925–1938 (Oklahoma National Guard)
- Rank: Second Lieutenant
- Unit: 357th Infantry Regiment of the 90th Division
- Battles/wars: World War I

William Grady Stigler (July 7, 1891 – August 21, 1952) was an American lawyer, World War I veteran, and politician who served four terms as and a U.S. representative from Oklahoma from 1944 to 1952.

== Biography ==
Stigler was a citizen of the Choctaw Nation of Oklahoma and is listed as three-eights Choctaw on the Dawes Rolls He was born the son of Joseph S. and Mary Jane Folsom Stigler in Stigler, Haskell County, Indian Territory (now Oklahoma). He attended the public schools, and graduated from Northeastern State College, Tahlequah, Oklahoma, in 1912. He also attended the law school of the University of Oklahoma at Norman.

== Career ==
During World War I, he served as a Second Lieutenant in the 357th Infantry Regiment of the 90th Division in 1918 and 1919, with overseas service. He attended the University of Grenoble in France during 1919.

Admitted to the Oklahoma Bar Association in 1920, Stigler commenced practice in Stigler, Oklahoma. He was city attorney of Stigler from 1920 to 1924. He served in the Oklahoma State Senate 1924 to 1932, serving as president pro tempore in 1931. He also served as Lieutenant Colonel in the 45th Division of the Oklahoma National Guard 1925-1938.

=== Family ===
On June 7, 1925, he married Ona Beller. The couple had two daughters, Denyse and Elaine.

=== Congress ===
Stigler was elected as a Democrat to the Seventy-eighth Congress to fill the vacancy caused by the resignation of Jack Nichols. He was reelected to the Seventy-ninth and to the three succeeding Congresses and served from March 28, 1944, until his death.

He was the only Choctaw elected to the U.S. Congress until the 2022 election of Republican Josh Brecheen.

== Death ==
Stigler died in Stigler, Haskell County, Okla., August 21, 1952 (age 61 years, 45 days). He is interred at Stigler Cemetery, Stigler, Oklahoma.

== See also ==
- List of Native Americans in the United States Congress
- List of members of the United States Congress who died in office (1950–1999)

U.S. House of Representatives
Preceded by John C. Nichols	Member of the U.S. House of Representatives from Oklahoma's 2nd congressional district March 28, 1944 — August 21, 1952	Succeeded by Ed Edmondson
