= Stigler Regional Airport =

Airport in Oklahoma, United States

- IATA: none; ICAO: KGZL; FAA LID: GZL

Summary
- Airport type: Public
- Owner: City of Stigler
- Serves: Stigler, Oklahoma
- Elevation AMSL: 599 ft (183 m)
- Coordinates: 35°17′17″N 095°05′38″W

Map
- Location of airport in Oklahoma GZL (the United States)

Runways
Direction	Length		Surface
Direction	ft	m	Surface
17/35	4,296	1,309	Asphalt

Statistics (2009)
- Aircraft operations: 5,500
- Based aircraft: 4
- Source: Federal Aviation Administration

Stigler Regional Airport (ICAO: KGZL, FAA LID: GZL, formerly F84) is a city-owned, public-use airport located three nautical miles (6 km) northeast of the central business district of Stigler, a city in Haskell County, Oklahoma, United States. It is included in the National Plan of Integrated Airport Systems for 2011–2015, which categorized it as a general aviation facility.

Although most U.S. airports use the same three-letter location identifier for the FAA and IATA, this airport is assigned GZL by the FAA, but has no designation from the IATA.

== Facilities and aircraft ==
Stigler Regional Airport covers an area of 166 acres (67 ha) at an elevation of 599 feet (183 m) above mean sea level. It has one runway designated 17/35 with an asphalt surface measuring 4,296 by 60 feet (1,309 x 18 m).

For the 12-month period ending July 27, 2009, the airport had 5,500 general aviation aircraft operations, an average of 15 per day. At that time there were 4 aircraft based at this airport: 75% single-engine and 25% multi-engine.

== See also ==
- List of airports in Oklahoma
