= Charles Pebworth =

American artist (1926–2019)

Charles Arthur Pebworth
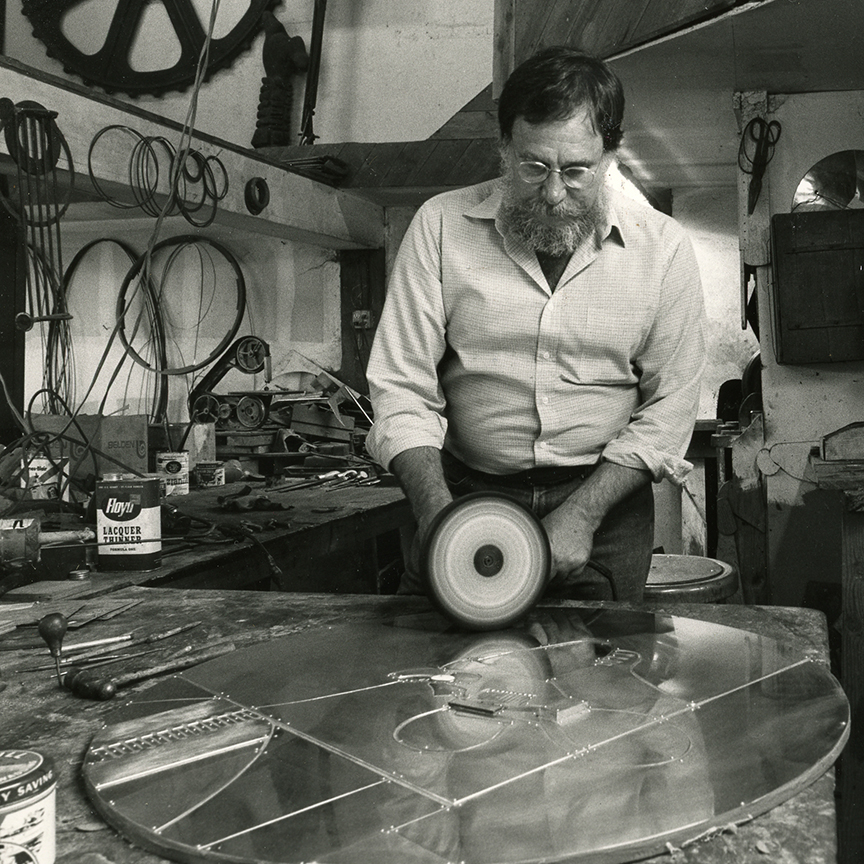
- Pebworth in his studio
- Born: November 3, 1926; Kinta, Oklahoma
- Died: January 10, 2019 (aged 92); Fayetteville, Arkansas
- Known for: Sculpture, Painting

Charles Arthur Pebworth (November 3, 1926 Kinta, Oklahoma - January 10, 2019 Fayetteville, Arkansas) was an American artist and educator of Choctaw descent, known for his abstract relief sculptures in metal and wood, cast-bronze and marble works, and figurative watercolor paintings. A longtime professor at Sam Houston State University (1957–1993), he played a central role in shaping modern sculpture education in Texas. His works combine industrial materials with organic and symbolic forms drawn from Native American heritage and natural geometry.

== Early life and education ==
Pebworth was born in Kinta, Oklahoma, within the Choctaw Nation, in 1926. His father was Choctaw and his mother white. When he was six, the family moved to Pawhuska, Oklahoma, where his father worked for the Osage Indian Tribal Agency of the Bureau of Indian Affairs. Growing up on the Osage Reservation, Pebworth spent long stretches outdoors, developing an early fascination with rocks, plants, and the structure of natural forms — an affinity that later informed his sculpture.

After serving as a U.S. Army paratrooper at the end of World War II, he enrolled at Colorado A&M College (now Colorado State University) to study forestry. Finding his interest drawn more to design than field science, he moved to Los Angeles in 1946 to attend the Art Center School (today the ArtCenter College of Design). He later studied at Baylor University (1948–50), then volunteered for service in the Korean War (1950).

Following his return to civilian life, Pebworth studied at the University of Oklahoma (1952–53), where he met fellow art student Nona DeShazo, who became his wife and frequent collaborator. He earned a BFA in Painting from the University of Houston (1955) and an MA in Sculpture from Louisiana State University (1957).

== Personal life ==
Pebworth married Nona DeShazo, a fellow artist he met while studying at the University of Oklahoma in 1952. The couple settled in Huntsville, Texas, where both were active in the university’s arts community and often collaborated on exhibitions and even field programs as far as Mexico and Italy. They had four children: Jared, Alison Pebworth—an artist herself known for socially engaged, itinerant installation project—Lisa, and Jeffery. After retiring from Sam Houston State University in 1993, Charles and Nona moved to Fayetteville, Arkansas, where he continued to work in his studio until his death in 2019. His wife, Nona, died in Fayetteville on April 21, 2022.

== Teaching and artistic career ==
Pebworth joined the art faculty at Sam Houston State University in 1957, founding its sculpture program and teaching there for thirty-six years. He also taught in SHSU’s Mexican Field School in Puebla (1958–61), served as Guest Professor of Sculpture at Del Mar College (1963), and taught at the Museum School of the Museum of Fine Arts Houston (1966–68). In the 1970's, he spent some time in Italy, where he was able to access Carrara Marble, yielding dozens of sculptures, most of which were shipped back to Texas.

Among his students was sculptor James Surls, who later cited Pebworth’s emphasis on material integrity and intuitive construction as formative, saying "[Charles] had this inherent ability to pick out the thing that was best in you, and to elevate it. And that’s why his students loved him. That’s why all of us loved him. He had a gift. He certainly gifted me. He was my doorway into the art world."

Throughout his career, Pebworth explored a wide spectrum of materials — carved wood, marble, welded steel, sheet metal, cast bronze, epoxy, and found objects. His most recognizable works are the mixed-media wall reliefs combining polished aluminum, brass, or copper with wood and semi-precious stones in rhythmic, geometric compositions that suggest totems, pyramids, or stylized figures.

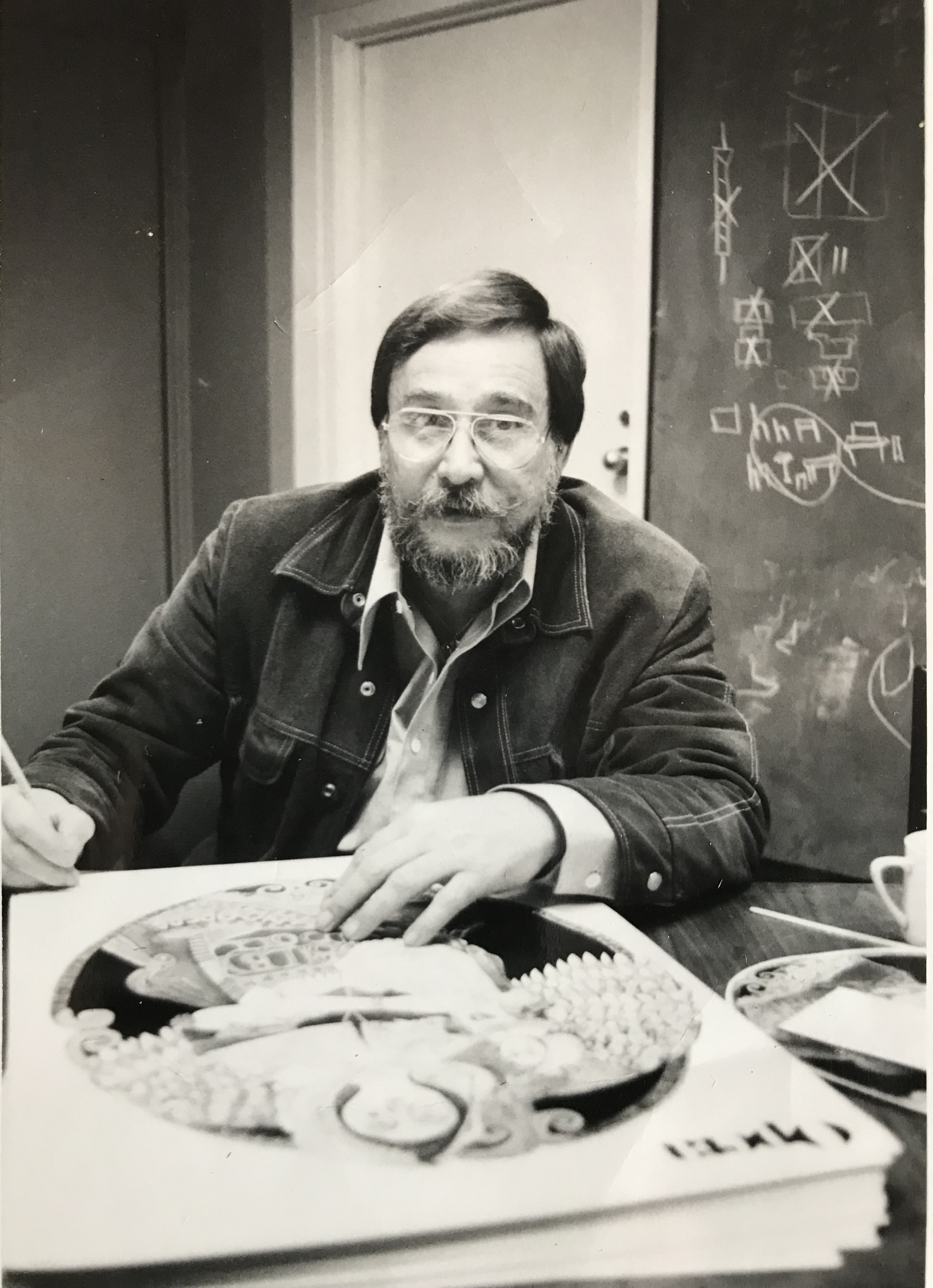
Charles Pebworth signing Houston Opera posters bearing his own cover design

His watercolors and ink drawings, often depicting winged or mythological women, appeared on programs and posters for Houston Grand Opera and Performing Arts Houston throughout the 1970s.

== Style and influences ==
Critics described Pebworth’s sculpture as a synthesis of modernist structure and mythic symbolism, occasionally calling him a "Southwest Renaissance man" who bridged material experimentation with the intuitive logic of ritual form. Critics noted his capacity to transform industrial materials into contemplative icons, and observing an ongoing negotiation between architecture and ritual object, each piece becoming a meditation on space and reflection. About his early experimentation, he said "I tried everything that I knew belonged to someone else: a form, a color... all these I rejected. Then I realized, of course, that there are symbols and signs and certain things that have a deep history, and so I accepted certain shapes and forms later." Regarding particular influences, he cited German sculptors, as well as Constantin Brancusi and Henry Moore.

Throughout the 1980s his Shrine and Totem series deepened this dialogue between modernist abstraction and spiritual archetype. In the 1990s and 2000s, his retrospective exhibitions in Victoria, Beeville, and Huntsville re-introduced the breadth of his practice to younger audiences, emphasizing his contributions to Texas modernism and his mentoring of a generation of sculptors.

== Critical reception ==
Periodicals from Texas Architect to Art Voices South have described Pebworth as a rare artist who makes modern materials feel ancient, turning industrial scrap into objects of reverence, hearkening to tribal altars, futurist temples—bridging material and myth, and creating a language that is both tactile and spiritual. Randy Tibbits, one of the founding members of the Houston Earlier Texas Art Group, notes that "what exuberant, distinctive art it is. You know a Pebworth piece from across the room — or across the vast lobby, in some cases, since many of his mixed media wall works — in metals, woods, stones — literally filled lobby walls in buildings around Houston and beyond. But every Pebworth work, even the pill-box sized pieces humble collectors in small spaces have room for, is unmistakably his." Brandon Zech, in his obituary in Glasstire (2019) celebrated him as an instrumental member of Houston and Huntsville’s art communities, invoking testimonial from other artists, such as James Surls and Andy Don Emmons, and gallerist Betty Moody, who referred to him as "an architect's dream."

Collectively, these writings trace a consistent critical view of Pebworth as a regional modernist whose fusion of industrial aesthetics and spiritual symbolism set him apart from both formalists and folk artists of his generation.

== Selected public collections ==
- Arkansas Museum of Fine Arts
- Art Museum of South Texas, Corpus Christi
- Beeville Art Museum
- Blanton Museum of Art, Austin, Texas
- City of Huntsville, Texas
- Museum of Fine Arts Houston
- Oklahoma State Art Collection
- Texas A&M University, Galveston, Jack K. Williams Library
- The Woodlands, Texas
- University Art Collection, Sam Houston State University, Huntsville, Texas
- University Art Collection, Southern Methodist University, Dallas, Texas
- University of Houston Public Art
- U.S. General Services Administration Fine Arts Collection
- Washington State Public Art Collection

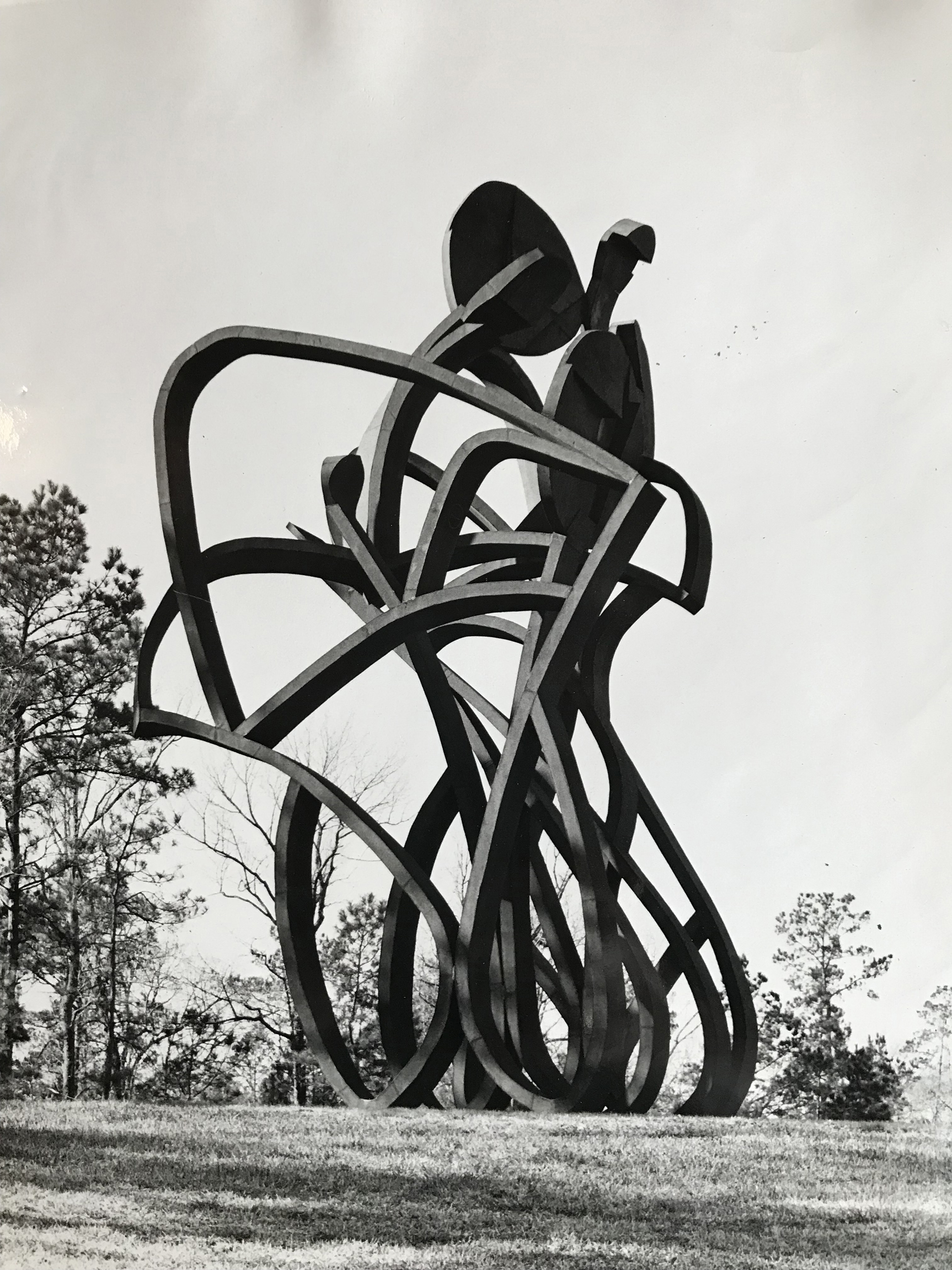
The Family, Pebworth's largest metal sculpture, as seen at the entrance to The Woodlands in Houston, TX

== Exhibitions and public commissions ==
Pebworth exhibited widely between the 1960s and early 2000s, with solo shows at venues including Houston’s DuBose and Moody Galleries, the Beeville Art Museum, the Art Museum of Southeast Texas in Beaumont, and the Nave Museum in VictoriaPebworth exhibited widely between the 1960s and early 2000s, with solo shows at venues including Houston’s DuBose and Moody Galleries, the Beeville Art Museum, the Art Museum of Southeast Texas in Beaumont, and the Nave Museum in Victoria. His work also appeared in university galleries and regional museums throughout Texas, Arkansas, and New Mexico, reflecting a career that bridged academic and public art spheres.

Among his major commissions are The Family (1974), a forty-foot corten-steel sculpture marking the entrance to The Woodlands, Texas, and Lookout from San Bois (1991), a marble sculpture created for the Alfred P. Murrah Federal Building in Oklahoma City. He also produced large architectural reliefs for Houston corporate and civic sites, including the Hyatt Regency Houston, noted for its synthesis of Native American symbology and modern industrial materials, a 5-ton marble sculpture acquired by the Herman Miller headquarters, and a celebrated circular exterior made of aluminum, bronze and copper for the showroom of Houston's Goodwin, Dannenbaum, Littman and Wingfield agency.

== Awards and legacy ==
In 1987 the Art League of Houston named Pebworth Texas Artist of the Year, recognizing his decades-long impact on sculpture and arts education. After retiring from SHSU in 1993 he moved to Fayetteville, Arkansas, continuing to produce new work until his death in 2019. His legacy persists through public art installations across Texas and Oklahoma and through students and colleagues who cite his teaching as a defining influence on the regional arts community.
