= Norma Howard =

Choctaw-Chickasaw Native American artist

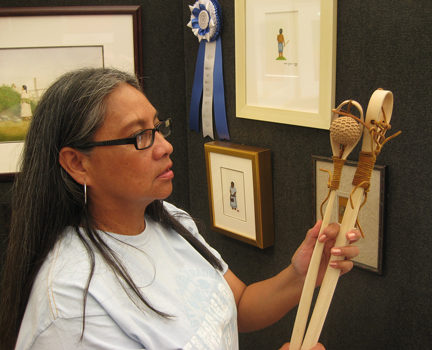
- Norma Howard with her son's ballsticks
- Born: Norma Williams; December 19, 1958; Stigler, Oklahoma, U.S.
- Died: 30 April 2024 (aged 65); Stigler, Oklahoma, U.S.
- Citizenship: Choctaw Nation of Oklahoma, American
- Education: self-taught
- Known for: watercolor painting
- Style: representational
- Spouse: David Howard

Norma "Nana" Howard (1958–2024) was a Choctaw Nation artist from Stigler, Oklahoma, who painted genre scenes of children playing, women working in fields, and other images inspired by family stories and Choctaw life. Howard won her first art award at the 1995 Red Earth Native American Cultural Festival in Oklahoma City. Her work is popular with collectors and critics.

== Early life ==
Howard was a citizen of the Choctaw Nation of Oklahoma and was of Chickasaw and Mississippi Choctaw descent. She grew up in a small, rural Oklahoma community. Her family was poor and her parents struggled to raise their eight children.

Howard's maternal grandmother had come to Oklahoma from Mississippi in the early 20th century as part of the second removal along the Choctaw Trail of Tears. Her grandmother spoke Choctaw, not English, and would sometimes tell the children stories in Choctaw. Howard's father's family had come to Indian Territory earlier, during the first removal, and at first settled in the Atoka area. Later her grandfather decided to move his family to Stigler, Oklahoma, where there were better schools. There they owned land and grew cotton.

Howard recalled drawing on anything she could: with a stick in the dirt, on brown paper bags, even on pages of an encyclopedia. She first attended a small country school with both white and Indian children. When other children played with toys or dolls that she did not have, Howard would draw what she saw "and that made me feel like I had those things." After third grade, when that school closed, she and her siblings attended Stigler schools, where she was the only Native child in her class. Howard vividly remembered one teacher who scolded her for drawing "Indian things" on the chalkboard, and for a while she stopped drawing altogether.

Her parents were proud of her art. Her father, a house painter, carried some of her drawings in his wallet. Using cheap paint palettes available at the local general store, Howard taught herself to paint. Once her father even took off a day of work to show her paintings at a local event. In 1974 people at a gift shop in Tahlequah "laughed at my work, like they didn't want it." After Howard started her family and began working at a sewing factory, she didn't have much time to paint. Then the factory closed down, and Howard worried about finding another job. In a dream, she heard her late father say to her, "Paint. That's what you always wanted to do."

== Early career ==
Howard's husband David insisted they visit an art supply store in another town to buy her better paints and paper to use. David also pushed Howard to enter her work in the annual Red Earth art market in Oklahoma City. She had just missed the deadline in 1995 to enter her work as a new artist but was allowed her to submit her request late. As Howard sat among the other artists and their works, she noticed her art was very different from most others. It seemed everything was Southwestern or Plains art. She listened as third place was announced, then second place, and she thought she had lost. When the announcer called "Norma Howard" for first place, she sat stunned, head down. That morning she had sold every painting in her booth. At Red Earth 1996, Howard won again.

After encouragement from Paul Rainbird, of the Southwestern Association for Indian Arts, Howard exhibited at the 1997 Santa Fe Indian Market and every year since. In 1998 she received a prestigious Santa Fe Market fellowship. She used it to travel to Mississippi to visit ancestral places of the Choctaws. Those swamps and lands have continued to inspire her paintings of Choctaw history, when Choctaws hid from troops who sent Native people west to Indian Territory.

== Style and notable works ==
As a self-taught artist, Howard has developed a unique style of watercolor painting that uses tiny brushstrokes, cross-hatching and layers to produce depth. Her landscapes almost always include people, because she believed it is people who give art life. She remembered as a child using a View-Master to look at pictures "so real you could touch it." Growing up, she did not know any Indian artists; in fact did not know many other Native families until her teens. So she was not aware of other Native art. Her first goal as an artist was to make something good enough for her mother and father to hang in their living room.

Her painting Green Corn is in the Gilcrease Museum in Tulsa, Oklahoma, while three more paintings hang in the Landmark Bank in Durant, Oklahoma. Since 2003, Howard has been represented by Blue Rain Gallery in Santa Fe, New Mexico.

== Awards and notable exhibitions ==
- 2015 Return from Exile: Contemporary Southeastern Indian Art, traveling exhibit
- 2014 Santa Fe Indian Market, Best of Classification III
- 2014 Southeastern Art Show and Market, Tishomingo, OK, Best of Division, 2-D Art
- 2013 Santa Fe Indian Market, Best of Classification III
- 2013 Greater Tulsa Indian Art Market, Glenpool, OK
- 2012 Santa Fe Indian Market, Gouache/Watercolor, First Place
- 2004 Trail of Tears Art Show, Cherokee Heritage Center, Park Hill, OK Grand Prize
- 1997+ Santa Fe Indian Market, Santa Fe, NM
- 1995 Red Earth Native Culture Festival, 1st place Watercolor, Oklahoma City, OK
- 1996 Red Earth Native Culture Festival, 1st place Watercolor, Oklahoma City, OK
