= Whitefield, Oklahoma =

- Town
- Location within Oklahoma
- Coordinates: 35°15′16″N 95°14′21″W
- Country: United States
- State: Oklahoma
- County: Haskell

Area
  - Total: 1.87 sq mi (4.85 km^{2})
  - Land: 1.71 sq mi (4.42 km^{2})
  - Water: 0.16 sq mi (0.42 km^{2})
- Elevation: 548 ft (167 m)

Population (2020)
  - Total: 371
  - Density: 217.3/sq mi (83.89/km^{2})
- Time zone: UTC-6 (Central (CST))
  - Summer (DST): UTC-5 (CDT)
- ZIP code: 74472
- Area codes: 539/918
- FIPS code: 40-80800
- GNIS feature ID: 2413479

Whitefield is a town in northwestern Haskell County, Oklahoma, United States. The population was 377 at the 2020 census, compared with the figure of 391 recorded in 2010. It was named for Methodist bishop George Whitefield (1714 - 1770).

== History ==
At the time of its founding, the community that became Whitefield was located in the Moshulatubbee District of the Choctaw Nation, in the Indian Territory.

Whitefield's history can be traced to the American Civil War, when the Confederate Army established Camp Pike for two thousand Confederate soldiers in 1861. The camp was named for Confederate Brigadier General Albert Pike, who had persuaded the Five Civilized Tribes to ally with the Confederacy.

After the end of the Civil War, Camp Pike became a Choctaw trading post. The trading post and the adjacent community were renamed as Oklahoma, Indian Territory. Its clientele were not only members of the Choctaw tribe, but also white settlers who had permits from the tribe to farm land in the Choctaw Nation. Occasionally, it was patronized by white outlaws such as Belle Starr, who were hiding from the law in the mountains of southern Oklahoma.The Post Office wanted to change the name because of confusion with another post office already known as Oklahoma Station. In 1888, the local residents voted to accept Whitfield as the name of the settlement and post office. The post office at Whitefield, Indian Territory, which had originally been established as Oklahoma, Indian Territory on December 21, 1881, was reestablished on November 27, 1888. It was named for Bishop George Whitefield, an early-day Methodist leader.

Whitefield existed primarily as a town to support the nearby farms. By 1911, it counted approximately 500 residents. Improvements included two groceries, two general stores, a cotton gin and mill, a drugstore, a doctor, and a blacksmith. It had about 300 residents by 1920. Reportedly, the population declined sharply with the onset of the Great Depression. Whitfield incorporated in 1978, so its first Federal Census in 1980 recorded 240 people. The population has trended upward since that year.

== Geography ==
Whitefield is located in northwestern Haskell County on high ground south of the Canadian River.

Oklahoma State Highways 2 and 9 intersect in the center of Whitefield. OK-2 leads north 16 miles (26 km) to Interstate 40 near Warner and south 10 miles (16 km) to Kinta, while OK-9 leads east 6 miles (10 km) to Stigler, the Haskell county seat, and west 23 miles (37 km) to Eufaula.

According to the United States Census Bureau, the town has a total area of 1.9 square miles (4.8 km^{2}), of which 1.7 square miles (4.4 km^{2}) are land and 0.2 square miles (0.4 km^{2}), or 8.81%, are water.

== Demographics ==
Historical population
| Census | Pop. | Note | %± |
|---|---|---|---|
| 1980 | 240 | | — |
| 1990 | 253 | | 5.4% |
| 2000 | 231 | | −8.7% |
| 2010 | 391 | | 69.3% |
| 2020 | 371 | | −5.1% |
U.S. Decennial Census

=== 2020 census ===
As of the 2020 census, Whitefield had a population of 371. The median age was 36.6 years. 30.5% of residents were under the age of 18 and 14.8% of residents were 65 years of age or older. For every 100 females there were 88.3 males, and for every 100 females age 18 and over there were 89.7 males age 18 and over.

0.0% of residents lived in urban areas, while 100.0% lived in rural areas.

There were 144 households in Whitefield, of which 39.6% had children under the age of 18 living in them. Of all households, 47.2% were married-couple households, 17.4% were households with a male householder and no spouse or partner present, and 25.7% were households with a female householder and no spouse or partner present. About 22.3% of all households were made up of individuals and 11.8% had someone living alone who was 65 years of age or older.

There were 165 housing units, of which 12.7% were vacant. The homeowner vacancy rate was 1.6% and the rental vacancy rate was 11.1%.

Racial composition as of the 2020 census
| Race | Number | Percent |
|---|---|---|
| White | 264 | 71.2% |
| Black or African American | 0 | 0.0% |
| American Indian and Alaska Native | 49 | 13.2% |
| Asian | 0 | 0.0% |
| Native Hawaiian and Other Pacific Islander | 0 | 0.0% |
| Some other race | 13 | 3.5% |
| Two or more races | 45 | 12.1% |
| Hispanic or Latino (of any race) | 17 | 4.6% |

=== 2000 census ===
As of the census of 2000, there were 231 people, 99 households, and 73 families residing in the town. The population density was 94.4 inhabitants per square mile (36.4/km^{2}). There were 110 housing units at an average density of 44.9 per square mile (17.3/km^{2}). The racial makeup of the town was 77.92% White, 12.99% Native American, 0.43% Asian, and 8.66% from two or more races.

There were 99 households, out of which 27.3% had children under the age of 18 living with them, 61.6% were married couples living together, 10.1% had a female householder with no husband present, and 25.3% were non-families. 24.2% of all households were made up of individuals, and 15.2% had someone living alone who was 65 years of age or older. The average household size was 2.33 and the average family size was 2.74.

In the town, the population was spread out, with 22.1% under the age of 18, 6.5% from 18 to 24, 26.4% from 25 to 44, 28.1% from 45 to 64, and 16.9% who were 65 years of age or older. The median age was 41 years. For every 100 females, there were 94.1 males. For every 100 females age 18 and over, there were 104.5 males.

The median income for a household in the town was $21,389, and the median income for a family was $33,125. Males had a median income of $26,786 versus $15,000 for females. The per capita income for the town was $14,306. About 15.7% of families and 23.2% of the population were below the poverty line, including 27.5% of those under the age of eighteen and 33.3% of those 65 or over.

== Governance ==
=== Town Council ===
Whitefield has a Mayor - Trustees form of government. Town officials are:

- Mayor - Larry McGuire
- Trustee - Jimmy Wixom
- Trustee - Jorge Sosa
- Trustee - Carolene Underwood
- Trustee - Deborah Glanz

=== City departments ===
- Town Clerk/Treasurer - Royce Alverson
- Sewer Manager - Chris Fraley
