= John C. Nichols =

American politician

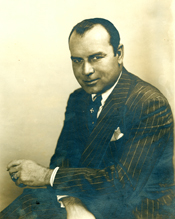

Member of the U.S. House of Representatives from Oklahoma's 2nd district
- In office January 3, 1935 – July 3, 1943
- Preceded by: William W. Hastings
- Succeeded by: William G. Stigler

Personal details
- Born: John Conover Nichols; August 31, 1896 Joplin, Missouri, U.S.
- Died: November 7, 1945 (aged 49) Asmara, British Military Eritrea
- Resting place: Greenwood Cemetery in Eufaula, Oklahoma.
- Party: Democratic
- Spouse: Marion Young Nichols
- Children: Nina Jean Nichols; Dan Nichols
- Education: Kansas State Teachers College

Military service
- Allegiance: United States of America
- Branch/service: United States Army
- Years of service: 1917 to 1919
- Unit: 19th Infantry
- Battles/wars: World War I

John Conover Nichols (August 31, 1896 – November 7, 1945) was an American lawyer, World War I veteran, and politician who served four terms as a U.S. representative from Oklahoma from 1935 to 1943.

== Biography ==
Born in Joplin, Missouri, Nichols was the son of John Adams and Mary Catherine Conover Nichols. He attended the public schools in Joplin, Missouri, and Colorado Springs, Colorado, and the teachers college at Emporia, Kansas. He married Marion Young in Tulsa on March 30, 1921. She was the daughter of William Buford and Nina Young of Eufaula. The Nichols had a daughter, Nina Jean, and a son, Dan. He studied law in the office of his brother in Eufaula, Oklahoma; and was admitted to the bar association in 1926 and commenced practice in Eufaula, Oklahoma.

== Career ==
During World War I Nichols served in the 19th Infantry, United States Army from 1917 to 1919.

=== Congress ===
Nichols was elected as a Democrat to the 74th Congress and to the four succeeding Congresses and served from January 3, 1935, until his resignation on July 3, 1943, to become vice president of Transcontinental & Western Airlines. While in office, he served on the Rivers and Harbors, Merchant Marine and Fisheries, Territories Committees. In 1935 and 1937 he was also a member of a special committee that went to Hawaii to hold hearings on statehood. His legislative interests focused on American Indians, soil conservation, old-age pensions, Civilian Conservation Corp (CCC) camps, and aviation.

== Death ==
Still vice president of Transcontinental & Western Airlines, Nichols died in an airplane crash at Asmara in Eritrea (then under a British Military Administration), on November 7, 1945.

He was originally interred in the United States military cemetery at Asmara, Eritrea, but his body was later moved and reinterred at Greenwood Cemetery in Eufaula, Oklahoma.

U.S. House of Representatives
Preceded by William W. Hastings	Member of the U.S. House of Representatives from Oklahoma's 2nd congressional district January 3, 1935 – July 3, 1943	Succeeded by William G. Stigler
