= Keota, Oklahoma =

- Town
- Location within Oklahoma Location within the United States
- Coordinates: 35°15′25″N 94°55′21″W
- Country: United States
- State: Oklahoma
- County: Haskell

Area
  - Total: 0.38 sq mi (0.98 km^{2})
  - Land: 0.37 sq mi (0.97 km^{2})
  - Water: 0 sq mi (0.00 km^{2})
- Elevation: 489 ft (149 m)

Population (2020)
  - Total: 437
  - Density: 1,161.1/sq mi (448.31/km^{2})
- Time zone: UTC-6 (Central (CST))
  - Summer (DST): UTC-5 (CDT)
- ZIP code: 74941
- Area codes: 539/918
- FIPS code: 40-39500
- GNIS feature ID: 2412827

Keota is a town in southeastern Haskell County, Oklahoma, United States. The population was 438 at the 2020 census, a 22.3 percent decrease over the figure of 564 recorded in 2010.

== History ==
The town was first called "KeeOtter", which was later changed to "Keota". The town's name may come from a Choctaw word meaning "the fire gone out", referring to an entire tribe being destroyed by disease, or may be derived from "Jim Keese", a rancher who owned the land where the townsite was located, and "Otter," for Otter Creek, a tributary of the Sans Bois Creek which winds its way through town.

Keota was founded in 1904 by the Midland Valley Railroad's land company, and a post office was established in 1905.

By 1911, the town supported several businesses, a hotel, and a lumberyard. The town supported local cotton growers, and was a railroad shipping point for their product.

The Great Depression caused Keota's population to fall from 494 in 1920 to 470 in 1930, though it rebounded to 619 by 1970.

In 1971, the McClellan–Kerr Arkansas River Navigation System was established on the Arkansas River, about 10 miles north of Keota. A dam on the river created the Robert S. Kerr Reservoir, which reaches to Keota. This enabled the Port of Keota to be established. Light industry was beginning to be drawn to the town at the end of the twentieth century, though by 2013, little remained of the port but a boatlaunch The railway had long been abandoned.

On December 31, 1974, the nearby Otter Creek Archaeological Site (NR 74001661) was listed on the National Register of Historic Places.

At the time of its founding, Keota was located in Moshulatubbee District, Choctaw Nation.

== Geography ==
Keota is located 38 miles (61 km) west of Fort Smith, Arkansas and 28 miles (45 km) south southwest of Sallisaw.

According to the United States Census Bureau, the town has a total area of 0.4 square miles (1.0 km^{2}), all land.

== Demographics ==
Historical population
| Census | Pop. | Note | %± |
|---|---|---|---|
| 1920 | 494 | | — |
| 1930 | 470 | | −4.9% |
| 1940 | 525 | | 11.7% |
| 1950 | 619 | | 17.9% |
| 1960 | 579 | | −6.5% |
| 1970 | 685 | | 18.3% |
| 1980 | 661 | | −3.5% |
| 1990 | 625 | | −5.4% |
| 2000 | 517 | | −17.3% |
| 2010 | 564 | | 9.1% |
| 2020 | 437 | | −22.5% |
U.S. Decennial Census

=== 2020 census ===
As of the 2020 census, Keota had a population of 437. The median age was 37.5 years. 26.3% of residents were under the age of 18 and 19.0% of residents were 65 years of age or older. For every 100 females there were 79.8 males, and for every 100 females age 18 and over there were 87.2 males age 18 and over.

0.0% of residents lived in urban areas, while 100.0% lived in rural areas.

There were 161 households in Keota, of which 31.1% had children under the age of 18 living in them. Of all households, 37.9% were married-couple households, 17.4% were households with a male householder and no spouse or partner present, and 34.8% were households with a female householder and no spouse or partner present. About 27.3% of all households were made up of individuals and 18.0% had someone living alone who was 65 years of age or older.

There were 203 housing units, of which 20.7% were vacant. The homeowner vacancy rate was 2.9% and the rental vacancy rate was 10.0%.

Racial composition as of the 2020 census
| Race | Number | Percent |
|---|---|---|
| White | 319 | 73.0% |
| Black or African American | 0 | 0.0% |
| American Indian and Alaska Native | 82 | 18.8% |
| Asian | 1 | 0.2% |
| Native Hawaiian and Other Pacific Islander | 0 | 0.0% |
| Some other race | 4 | 0.9% |
| Two or more races | 31 | 7.1% |
| Hispanic or Latino (of any race) | 11 | 2.5% |

=== 2000 census ===
As of the census of 2000, there were 517 people, 204 households, and 140 families residing in the town. The population density was 1,388.4 inhabitants per square mile (536.1/km^{2}). There were 230 housing units at an average density of 617.6 per square mile (238.5/km^{2}). The racial makeup of the town was 81.43% White, 12.19% Native American, 0.19% Asian, 2.71% from other races, and 3.48% from two or more races. Hispanic or Latino of any race were 4.84% of the population.

There were 204 households, out of which 36.8% had children under the age of 18 living with them, 54.9% were married couples living together, 10.3% had a female householder with no husband present, and 30.9% were non-families. 29.9% of all households were made up of individuals, and 14.7% had someone living alone who was 65 years of age or older. The average household size was 2.53 and the average family size was 3.15.

In the town, the population was spread out, with 30.9% under the age of 18, 8.5% from 18 to 24, 24.6% from 25 to 44, 21.7% from 45 to 64, and 14.3% who were 65 years of age or older. The median age was 34 years. For every 100 females, there were 82.7 males. For every 100 females age 18 and over, there were 85.9 males.

The median income for a household in the town was $20,000, and the median income for a family was $25,750. Males had a median income of $25,000 versus $13,250 for females. The per capita income for the town was $10,023. About 19.7% of families and 27.0% of the population were below the poverty line, including 26.9% of those under age 18 and 31.9% of those age 65 or over.

== Notable people ==
- Sim Iness - Olympic gold medalist and world record holder for the discus.
- Major General Sidney Marks - distinguished WWII infantry officer and All-American wrestler.
