= Sidney Marks =

U.S. Army general (1919–1995)

Sidney Michael Marks (January 8, 1919 – March 23, 1995) was a Major General in the United States Army and an All-American wrestler.

== Early life ==
Marks was born in Keota, Oklahoma to Sidney Z. and Pearl J. (Smith) Marks. His father, a Jewish immigrant from Pilviškiai, Lithuania, served in the Army in World War I. After his father became a permanent patient at the Veteran's Administration Hospital in Little Rock, Arkansas, Marks and his siblings were raised in the American Legion Children's Home (now the Marland Children's Home) in Ponca City, Oklahoma. Marks attended college at Oklahoma A&M, graduating in 1942 with a B.S. in military science. While there he was a member of the 1942 national championship wrestling team, and was named as an All-American, losing the national championship final in the 128-pound class to Burl Jennings.

== Army career ==
Marks entered the Army as an Infantry officer in 1942. He saw combat as a battalion liaison officer in the 517th Parachute Infantry Regiment during World War II. During the Korean War he served as a commander of an infantry battalion. From 1960 to 1962 he commanded the 504th Parachute Infantry Regiment stationed in Germany. During 1966 and 1967 he was in command of the 1st Infantry Division's 3rd Brigade in Vietnam. He was promoted to major general in 1971 and in 1973 became the United States Army Alaska commanding general. In 1975 he became the deputy commanding general of the 18th Airborne Corps at Fort Bragg.

During his career Marks was decorated with the Silver Star with oak leaf cluster, the Legion of Merit with five oak leaf clusters, the Distinguished Flying Cross, the Bronze Star with five oak leaf clusters, the Air Medal with twenty-six oak leaf clusters, the Purple Heart, the Soldier's Medal, and the Army Commendation with oak leaf cluster.

== Personal life ==
Marks married Sybil Combs on June 6, 1946. Their children are Steven Michael, Sharon Lynne and Sally Kim Marks. Marks retired to Fayetteville, North Carolina.

== Bibliography ==
- Who's Who in America, 40th edition, 1978–1979. Wilmette, IL: Marquis Who's Who, 1978
