= Stiegler =

Stiegler a surname, may refer to:

- Anna Stiegler, German politician
- Barbara Stiegler, French political philosopher
- Bernard Stiegler, French philosopher
- Johnnie Stiegler, American pair skater
- Josef "Pepi" Stiegler, Austrian alpine skier
- Judy Stiegler. American politician
- Ludwig Stiegler, German politician
- Marc Stiegler, American science fiction author and software developer
- Resi Stiegler, American alpine skier
- Robert Stiegler, Chicago filmmaker and photographer
- Stephanie Stiegler, American pair skater
- Tiffany Stiegler, American figure skater
