= Stigler, Oklahoma =

- City
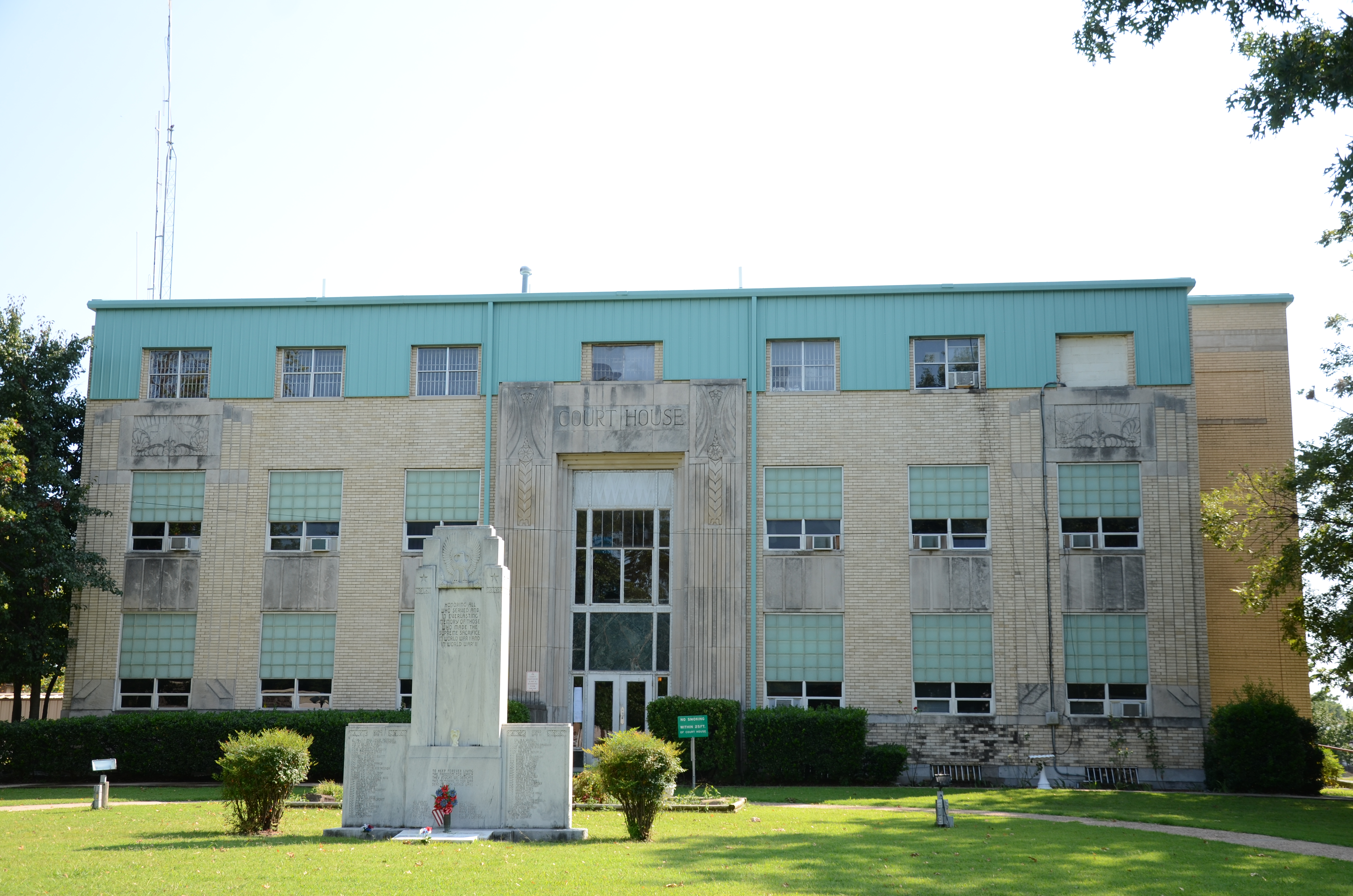
- Haskell County Courthouse in 2015

- Location within Oklahoma
- Coordinates: 35°15′26″N 95°07′05″W
- Country: United States
- State: Oklahoma
- County: Haskell

Area
  - Total: 2.74 sq mi (7.09 km^{2})
  - Land: 2.70 sq mi (6.99 km^{2})
  - Water: 0.039 sq mi (0.10 km^{2})
- Elevation: 571 ft (174 m)

Population (2020)
  - Total: 2,703
  - Density: 1,000.8/sq mi (386.42/km^{2})
- Time zone: UTC-6 (Central (CST))
  - Summer (DST): UTC-5 (CDT)
- ZIP code: 74462
- Area codes: 539/918
- FIPS code: 40-70250
- GNIS feature ID: 2411981
- Website: www.stiglerok.net

Stigler is a city in and the county seat of Haskell County, Oklahoma. As of the 2020 census, Stigler had a population of 2,703.

== History ==
At the time of its founding, Newman, later Stigler, was located in Sans Bois County, a part of the Moshulatubbee District of the Choctaw Nation in Indian Territory. A post office was established at Newman, Indian Territory on April 30, 1892. The community was named for Dr. Martin W. Newman, a pioneer and physician.

Joseph Stigler is said to have founded the town in 1889. He was familiar with the area, as earlier he had served as a deputy marshal under federal judge Isaac C. Parker, whose court in Fort Smith, Arkansas, had jurisdiction over Indian Territory. The post office name was changed to Stigler on May 3, 1893 by the U.S. Post Office Service, because the former name caused some confusion with the town of Norman.

The Midland Valley Railroad was constructed to Stigler in 1904, which attracted more settlers and more types of businesses. By the following year, the town had become incorporated. At statehood in 1907, Stigler was named as the county seat of newly created Haskell County.

Stigler is home to the Haskell County Courthouse. In the late 20th century, the county court was known for having installed marble plaques inscribed with the Ten Commandments and the Mayflower Compact on the front lawn of the courthouse. (See Separation of church and state in the United States.) In the seventh commandment, the word "adultery" was misspelled as "adultry". Opponents sued for the commandments to be removed, arguing that the installation was unconstitutional and violated the principle of the separation of church and state in the United States. The court agreed and ordered the Commandments removed from the lawn. However, it was only moved over about 20 feet and is basically still on the lawn of the courthouse.

== Geography ==
Stigler is located in central Haskell County. Oklahoma State Highway 9 is the city's Main Street, and leads east 12 miles (19 km) to Keota and west 6 miles (9.7 km) to Whitefield. Oklahoma State Highway 82 leads south from Stigler 11 miles (18 km) to Lequire. Muskogee is 43 miles (69 km) to the north, and Fort Smith, Arkansas is 49 miles (79 km) to the east.

According to the United States Census Bureau, Stigler has a total area of 2.6 square miles (6.8 km^{2}), of which 0.04 square miles (0.1 km^{2}), or 1.42%, are water.

== Demographics ==
Historical population
Census	Pop.	Note	%±
1910	1,583		—
1920	1,797		13.5%
1930	1,517		−15.6%
1940	1,861		22.7%
1950	2,125		14.2%
1960	1,923		−9.5%
1970	2,347		22.0%
1980	2,630		12.1%
1990	2,574		−2.1%
2000	2,731		6.1%
2010	2,685		−1.7%
2020	2,703		0.7%
U.S. Decennial Census

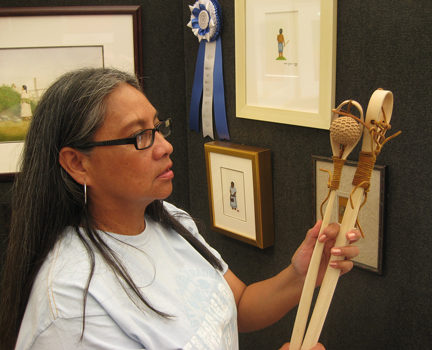
Award-winning painter Norma Howard (Choctaw) is from Stigler.

=== 2020 census ===
As of the 2020 census, Stigler had a population of 2,703, a median age of 37.8 years, 25.5% of residents under the age of 18, and 19.1% of residents 65 years of age or older. For every 100 females there were 89.6 males, and for every 100 females age 18 and over there were 87.8 males age 18 and over.

None of Stigler's residents lived in urban areas, while 100.0% lived in rural areas.

There were 1,075 households in Stigler, of which 33.6% had children under the age of 18 living in them. Of all households, 39.7% were married-couple households, 19.3% were households with a male householder and no spouse or partner present, and 35.8% were households with a female householder and no spouse or partner present. About 34.6% of all households were made up of individuals and 17.4% had someone living alone who was 65 years of age or older.

There were 1,302 housing units, of which 17.4% were vacant. Among occupied housing units, 56.4% were owner-occupied and 43.6% were renter-occupied. The homeowner vacancy rate was 4.4% and the rental vacancy rate was 10.8%.

Racial composition as of the 2020 census
Race	Percent
White	67.6%
Black or African American	0.7%
American Indian and Alaska Native	16.6%
Asian	0.1%
Native Hawaiian and Other Pacific Islander	0%
Some other race	4.4%
Two or more races	10.6%
Hispanic or Latino (of any race)	9.2%

=== 2000 census ===
As of the 2000 census, there were 2,731 people, 1,096 households, and 697 families residing in the city. The population density was 1,237.6 inhabitants per square mile (477.8/km^{2}). There were 1,216 housing units at an average density of 551.0 per square mile (212.7/km^{2}). The racial makeup of the city was 78.76% White, 0.04% African American, 15.45% Native American, 0.33% Asian, 0.59% from other races, and 4.83% from two or more races. Hispanic or Latino of any race were 2.67% of the population.

There were 1,096 households, out of which 32.4% had children under the age of 18 living with them, 47.6% were married couples living together, 13.4% had a female householder with no husband present, and 36.4% were non-families. 33.9% of all households were made up of individuals, and 20.3% had someone living alone who was 65 years of age or older. The average household size was 2.36 and the average family size was 3.06.

In the city, the population was spread out, with 26.3% under the age of 18, 9.3% from 18 to 24, 24.5% from 25 to 44, 18.6% from 45 to 64, and 21.3% who were 65 years of age or older. The median age was 36 years. For every 100 females, there were 81.0 males. For every 100 females age 18 and over, there were 74.4 males.

The median income for a household in the city was $19,594, and the median income for a family was $28,839. Males had a median income of $24,350 versus $22,500 for females. The per capita income for the city was $16,293. About 20.5% of families and 25.8% of the population were below the poverty line, including 33.1% of those under age 18 and 18.1% of those age 65 or over.

== Economy ==
Stigler prospered through agriculture during the early part of the 20th century. However, cotton and corn could not sustain the town through the Great Depression of the 1930s. According to the Encyclopedia of Oklahoma History and Culture, local farmers became raisers of livestock, largely with the assistance of the federal government. After World War II, construction of two large new reservoirs in the region, Eufaula Lake and Robert S. Kerr Reservoir, generated many jobs in construction, followed by an upsurge of tourism to the area. Stigler also succeeded in attracting several small manufacturing plants. (Note: One is Rosewood Industries, which produces furniture for hotels and motels.)

The Stigler Industrial Park is owned by the city (Stigler Industrial Trust), and covers 35 acres (14 ha), located a quarter mile off State Highway 9. It currently houses seven employers, with a total of 194 employees.

== Education ==
=== Public schools ===
The Stigler Board of Education is responsible for the Stigler School System, which consists of one grade school, one middle school and one high school. The Board of Education has five members and meets monthly.

=== Kiamichi Technology Center ===
One campus of the Kiamichi Technology Center (KTC) is located at 1410 Old Military Road in Stigler. The Stigler branch offers training programs in automobile service technology, construction technology, cosmetology, emergency medical services, health science and welding technology.

== Transportation ==
=== Air ===
Stigler Regional Airport, owned by the city of Stigler (FAA Identifier GZL), is 3 miles (4.8 km) northeast of the city. It went into service in January 1997, for private aircraft. There is no control tower and no scheduled airline service. Runway 17/35 is asphalt covered, with dimensions of 4,296 by 60 feet (1,309 by 18 m).

=== Transportation ===
Stigler is at the intersection of Oklahoma State Highway 9 and Oklahoma State Highway 82.

KI BOIS Area Transit System (KATS) is a rural public transportation system that operates over 200 buses and vans that transport people to senior citizens centers, grocery stores, doctors, and work. KATS serves residents of Adair, Cherokee, Haskell, Hughes, Latimer, LeFlore, McIntosh, Okmulgee, Okfuskee, Pittsburg, Sequoyah and Wagoner counties. Its administrative office and maintenance facility is in Stigler.

== Governance ==
=== City council ===
Stigler has a council-manager form of government. City officials are:

- Founder of Stigler - Joseph Stigler
- Mayor - Larry Godfrey
- Vice Mayor - Brad Martin
- Council Member - Brian Morrison
- Council Member - William "Bill" Allen
- Council Member - Rebecca "Becky" Bumpers
- City Manager - Bobby Mouser
- Sheriff - Terry Garland

=== City departments ===
- Police Department Gary Balinger is police chief and John Vail is the assistant police chief. Kenny Medlock is 911 Director. There are 9 full-time and 4 part-time officers,4 full-time and 1 part-time Dispatchers.
- Fire Department consists of Fire Chief Jim Hays and 25 volunteer firefighters. ="StiglerGov"/>

== Media ==
Stigler has had several newspapers, starting with the Stigler Beacon, which was followed by the State Sentinel. Others have been the Haskell County Leader, the Haskell County News, the Haskell County Tribune, the Country Star, and the Stigler News-Sentinel. (Note: The Stigler News-Sentinel is the only media outlet now listed for Stigler.)

== NRHP sites ==
NRHP sites in Stigler include the Haskell County Courthouse, the Stigler School Gymnasium-Auditorium, the Tamaha Jail and Ferry Landing northeast of Stigler, and the Mule Creek Site (address restricted).

== Notable people ==
- Norma Howard, Choctaw contemporary painter
- Ted Risenhoover (1934-2006), born in Stigler and graduated from Stigler High School in 1952. A newspaper publisher, he represented the Second Congressional District in the U. S. Congress from 1975 to 1979.
- William G. Stigler (1891 - 1952), lived and was buried in Stigler. He was the son of founder Joseph Stigler. After graduating from the University of Oklahoma law school, he became a lawyer and represented the Second Congressional District in the U. S. Congress from 1944 to 1952.
