= Alison Pebworth =

American artist known for installation, mapping, and participatory projects

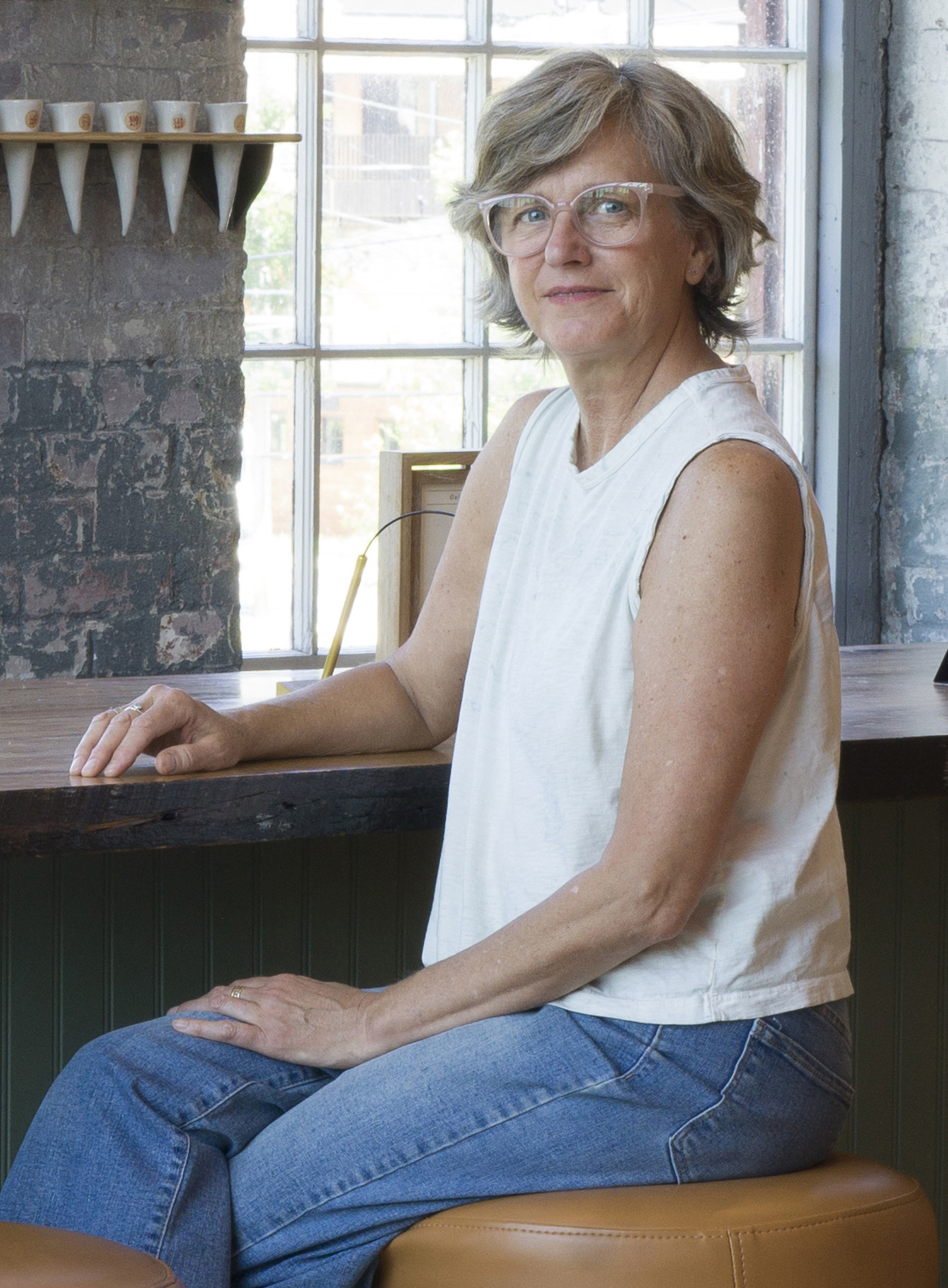
- Born: 1964 (age 61–62); Huntsville, Texas
- Education: University of Texas (BFA); University of Kansas (MFA)
- Known for: Installation art; social practice; mapping; participatory projects
- Notable work: Beautiful Possibility; Cultural Apothecary; Reconnecting to Home; Unofficial Department of Handshakes
- Awards: Louis Comfort Tiffany Foundation Award (2015); MacDowell Fellow (2021)
- Website: alisonpebworth.com

Alison Pebworth is an American artist whose work incorporates painting, installation, itinerant exhibition formats, and public participation in an ongoing examination American cultural narratives. Her projects — often produced through long-duration travel, site-responsive construction, and conversational or survey-based participation — have been presented at institutions including MASS MoCA, Southern Exposure, The New Children’s Museum in San Diego, the Utah Museum of Contemporary Art, and SPACES in Cleveland. Pebworth has also exhibited across a network of artist-run and non-profit spaces in Canada and the United States through the multi-year touring project Beautiful Possibility.

In 2024, after many years of itinerant touring, Pebworth relocated to the Berkshires and began developing new work in North Adams, marking a shift from mobile presentation toward site-based construction. Her 2025–26 project Cultural Apothecary at MASS MoCA extended these methods into a large-scale installation with structured public programming and broadcast coverage.

== Early life and education ==
Pebworth grew up in Texas and later settled in San Francisco. She studied at the University of Texas (BFA) and the University of Kansas (MFA). She is the daughter of sculptor Charles Pebworth.

== Selected exhibitions ==
- 2025–26: Cultural Apothecary, MASS MoCA (North Adams, MA).
- 2016–18: Innards and Upwards: A San Francisco Wunderkammer, SFAC Main Gallery.
- 2017: Moon to Solstice, Wildlands Residency performance (Sonoma, CA)
- 2015: Reconnecting to Home, The New Children’s Museum (San Diego, CA).
- 2010–13: Beautiful Possibility Tour, Go West, Utah Museum of Contemporary Art (UMOCA) (Salt Lake City, UT), among various other stops.

== Honors and residencies ==
- Helene Wurlitzer Foundation, Artist-in-Residence (2022)
- MacDowell Fellow (2021).
- Bemis Center for Contemporary Arts (2017)
- Louis Comfort Tiffany Foundation Award (2015).
- Center for Cultural Innovation support for Beautiful Possibility (2013).
- Neighborhood Sign Project, Alternative Exposure Grant, Southern Exposure (2007).
- New American Paintings, Pacific Coast Edition Winner – Issue #19 (1999).
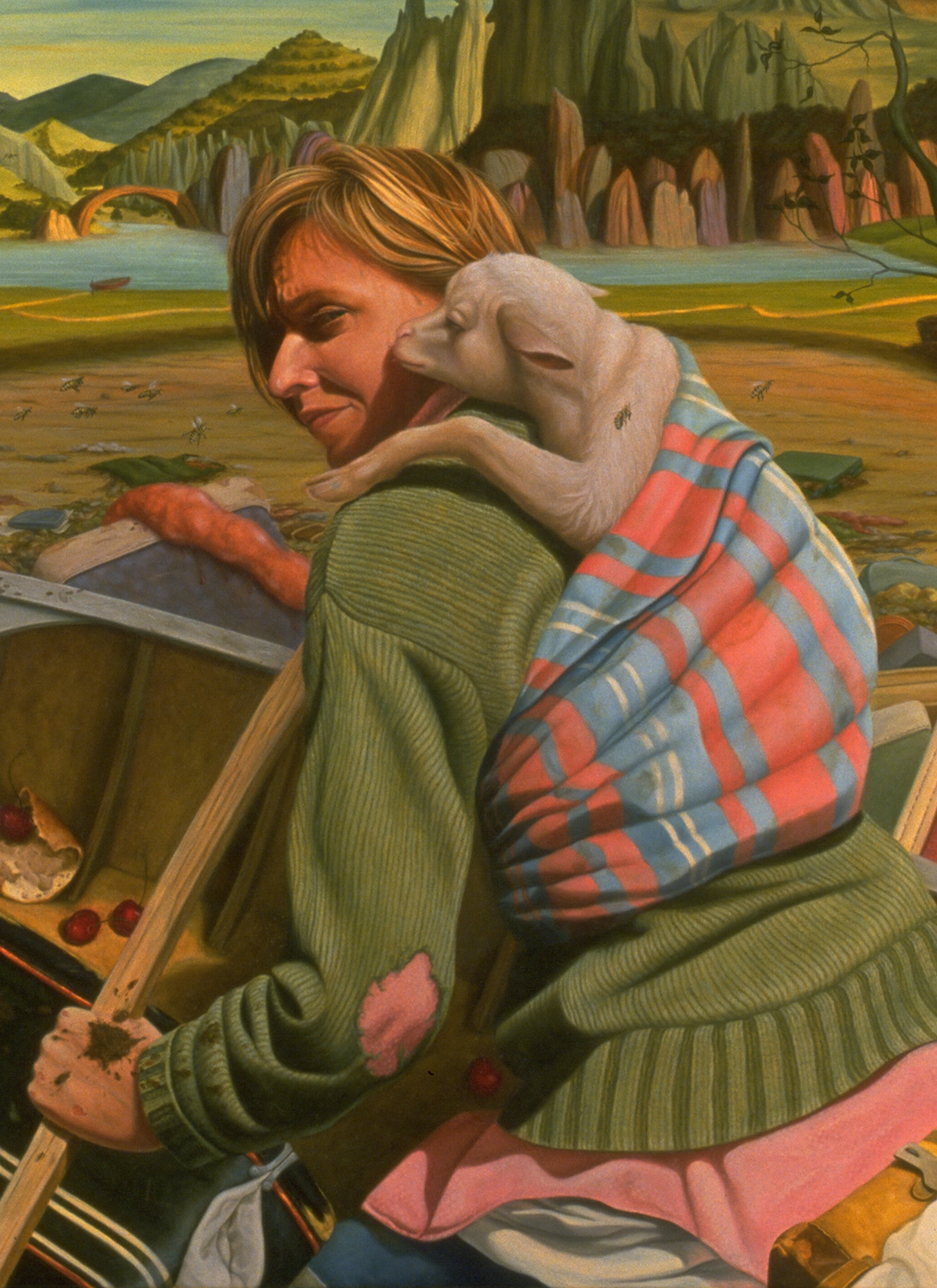
  A Simple Plan, oil on canvas, detail

== Publications and collaborations ==
- Contributor (maps/graphics) to Rebecca Solnit et al.’s atlas series; the UC Press box set Infinite Cities: A Trilogy of Atlases won the 2020 Alice Award.
- Beautiful Possibility catalog (Southern Exposure) with essay by Rebecca Solnit (pdf excerpt).
