= Haskell County Courthouse =

- U.S. National Register of Historic Places
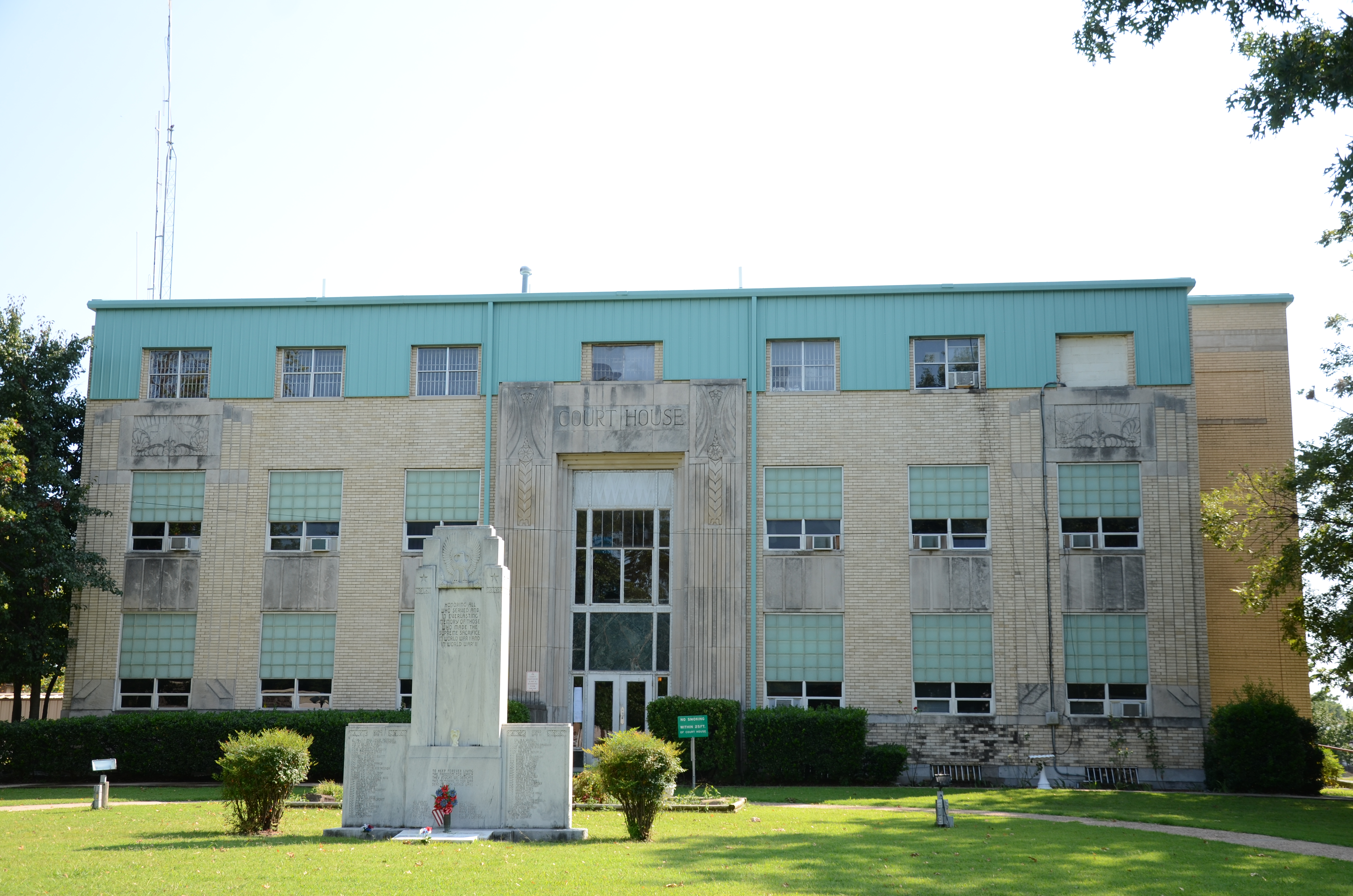

- Location within Oklahoma Location within the United States
- Interactive map showing the location of Haskell County Courthouse
- Location: 202 E. Main St., Stigler, Oklahoma
- Coordinates: 35°15′14″N 95°04′48″W
- Area: 1 acre (0.40 ha)
- Built: 1931
- Architect: Walter T. Vahlbarg
- Architectural style: Art Deco
- MPS: County Courthouses of Oklahoma TR
- NRHP reference No.: 84003061
- Added to NRHP: August 23, 1984

The Haskell County Courthouse, at 202 E. Main St. in Stigler, Oklahoma, was built in 1931. It was listed on the National Register of Historic Places in 1984.

It is a three-story, buff brick building. Its first- and second-story windows have pale green glass bricks. A green marble inset appears above the front doorway.

The Courthouse was the site of a controversy starting in 2004, when the Haskell County Commissioners approved the placement on the county courthouse lawn of an 8-by-3-foot granite Ten Commandments monument. Suit was filed in 2005 by a Haskell County resident and the American Civil Liberties Union, challenging that placement as a government establishment of religion. In June 2009, a unanimous 10th U.S. Circuit Court of Appeals ruled that a government-sponsored Ten Commandments monument placed on a Courthouse lawn was unconstitutional and had to be removed. In March 2010, the U.S. Supreme Court let the 10th Circuit ruling stand. In the aftermath, the monument was moved from the Courthouse lawn to a spot about a block east on private property belonging to American Legion Post 22, and the County agreed to pay the ACLU $199,000 for attorney fees and all costs.
