= Kinta High School =

- U.S. National Register of Historic Places
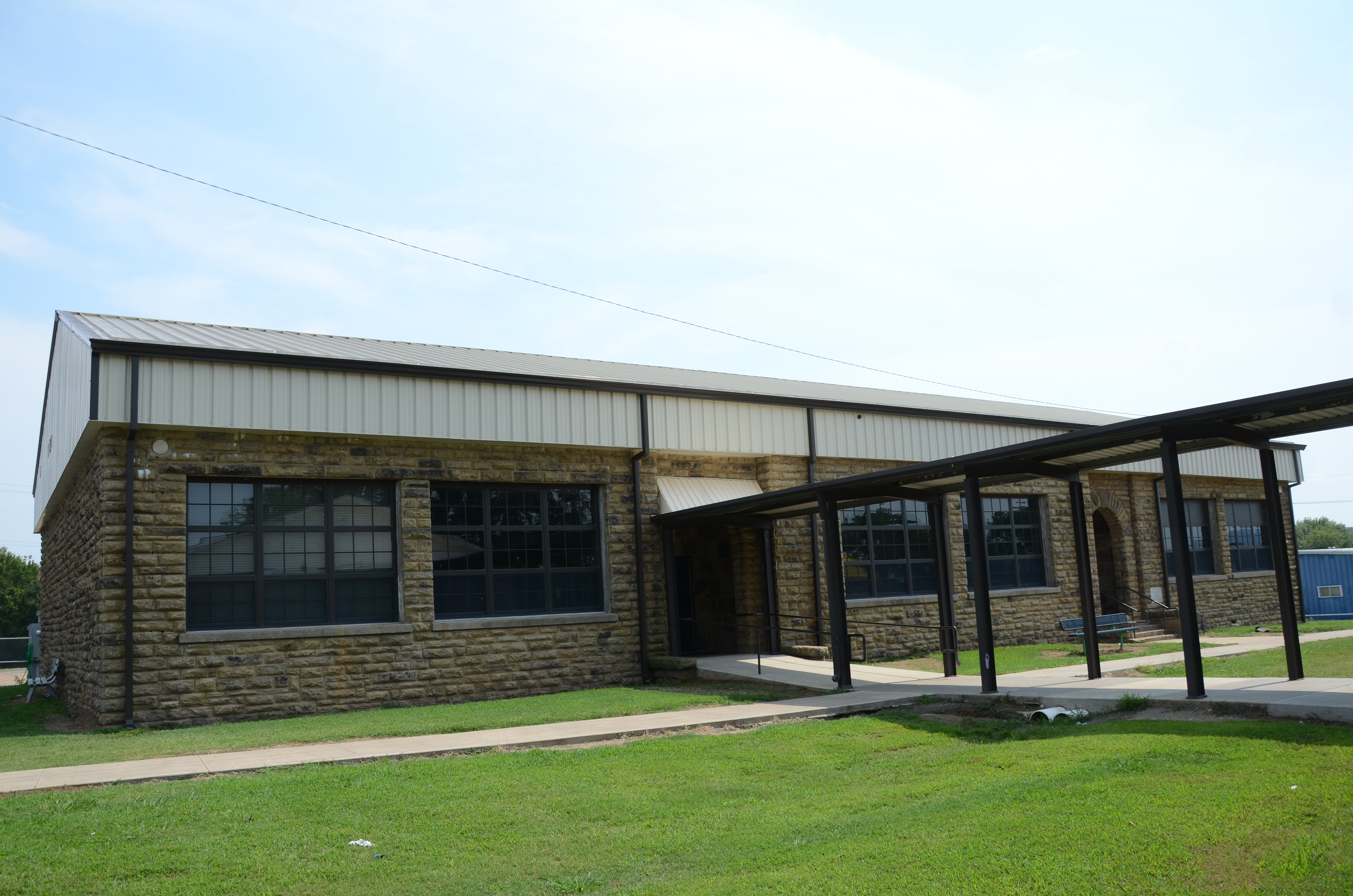

- Location within Oklahoma
- Location: OK 2, Kinta, Oklahoma
- Coordinates: 35°06′30″N 95°14′15″W
- Area: less than one acre
- Built: 1936
- Built by: Works Progress Administration; Okla. State Dept. of Education
- Architectural style: Romanesque, Richardsonian Romanesque
- MPS: WPA Public Bldgs., Recreational Facilities and Cemetery Improvements in Southeastern Oklahoma, 1935--1943 TR
- NRHP reference No.: 88001383
- Added to NRHP: September 26, 1988

The Kinta High School, on OK 2 in Kinta, Oklahoma, was built with Works Progress Administration funding in 1936. It was listed on the National Register of Historic Places in 1988.

It is a one-story 55 by 122 feet (17 m × 37 m) building, originally with six rooms, built of rusticated, coursed sandstone. Its NRHP nomination describes its masonry as "impressive, especially on the corners. The Richardsonian influence is apparent. The roof is flat with parapets; two front entryways on the west are recessed behind arches. Windows, with concrete sills, are arranged by threes and reach to the level of interior ceilings."

Its construction provided work for unemployed coal miners.

The building has been modified with original parapets obscured by a roof and projecting walkway.
