= Security Technical Implementation Guide =

Computer security methodology

A Security Technical Implementation Guide (STIG) is a configuration standard consisting of cybersecurity requirements for a specific product.

== Standard ==
The use of STIGs enables a methodology for securing protocols within networks, servers, computers, and logical designs to enhance overall security. These guides, when implemented, enhance security for software, hardware, physical and logical architectures to further reduce vulnerabilities.

Examples where STIGs would be of benefit is in the configuration of a desktop computer or an enterprise server. Most operating systems are not inherently secure, which leaves them open to criminals such as identity thieves and computer hackers. A STIG describes how to minimize network-based attacks and prevent system access when the attacker is interfacing with the system, either physically at the machine or over a network. STIGs also describe maintenance processes such as software updates and vulnerability patching.

Advanced STIGs might cover the design of a corporate network, covering configurations of routers, databases, firewalls, domain name servers and switches.

== See also ==
- CIA triad
- Information Assurance
- Security Content Automation Protocol
