= Haskell County, Oklahoma =

County in Oklahoma, United States

- County
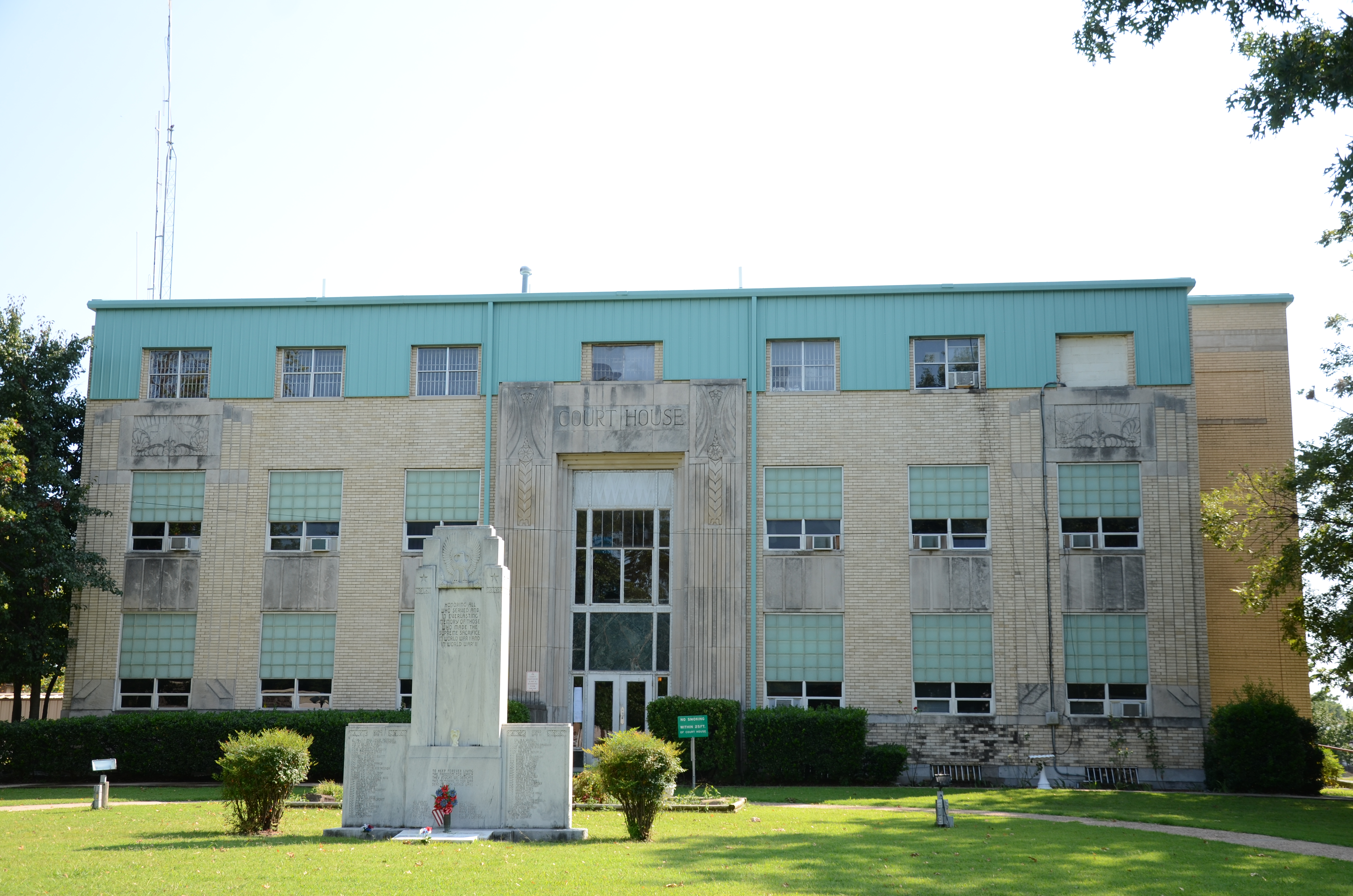
- Haskell County Courthouse in Stigler

- Location within the U.S. state of Oklahoma
- Coordinates: 35°14′N 95°07′W
- Country: United States
- State: Oklahoma
- Founded: 1907
- Named for: Charles N. Haskell
- Seat: Stigler
- Largest city: Stigler

Area
  - Total: 625 sq mi (1,620 km^{2})
  - Land: 577 sq mi (1,490 km^{2})
  - Water: 49 sq mi (130 km^{2}) 7.8%

Population (2020)
  - Total: 11,561
  - Estimate (2025): 11,787 ▲
  - Density: 20.0/sq mi (7.74/km^{2})
- Time zone: UTC−6 (Central)
  - Summer (DST): UTC−5 (CDT)
- Congressional district: 2nd

Haskell County is a county located in the southeast quadrant of the U.S. state of Oklahoma. As of the 2020 census, its population was 11,561. Its county seat is Stigler. The county is named in honor of Charles N. Haskell, the first governor of Oklahoma.

== History ==
The area now comprising Haskell County was created at statehood primarily from the former Sans Bois County of the Choctaw Nation in Indian Territory. Sans Bois County was part of the Moshulatubbee District, one of three administrative super-regions comprising the Choctaw Nation. Small portions of present-day Haskell County fell within Gaines County and Skullyville County, Choctaw Nation.

In 1908, county voters picked Stigler over Keota and Whitefield as the county seat.

Underground coal mining was undertaken here in the early 20th century, creating jobs and attracting railroad construction to southern Haskell County. The San Bois Coal Company built more than 400 company houses in McCurtain and Chant (two towns that eventually merged into one) for their miners. In 1912, a large, underground explosion rocked the Number Two mine at McCurtain, killing 73 miners and bankrupting the San Bois Company. The McCurtain disaster and the declining demand for coal in the 1920s halted underground coal mining in the county.

Strip mining continued. The Lone Star Steel Company became the county's leading coal producer. Haskell County was the source of 20% of Oklahoma's coal production between 1950 and 1980.

Agriculture was the most important component of the county economy in the early 20th century. Cotton was the most important crop, followed by corn and oats. The collapse of cotton prices and the Great Depression caused a drop in population, as well as farm acreage. In 1934, the Federal Emergency Relief Administration helped over 85% of Haskell County's population. Ranching supplanted farming, which was forced to diversify. By 1964, livestock accounted for about 70% of the county's revenues.

== Geography ==
According to the U.S. Census Bureau, the county has a total area of 625 square miles (1,620 km^{2}), of which 49 square miles (130 km^{2}) (7.8%) are covered by water. The county elevation varies because of the Sans Bois Mountains in the southern part of the county from 500 to 1,500 feet (150 to 460 m). The relatively large water area results from the presence of Eufaula Lake and the Robert S. Kerr Reservoir. The South Canadian River forms the northern border with McIntosh and Muskogee counties before draining into the Arkansas River at the Robert S. Kerr Reservoir. The river forms the northeastern border with Sequoyah County.

=== Major highways ===
- State Highway 2
- State Highway 9
- State Highway 28
- State Highway 31
- State Highway 71
- State Highway 82

=== Adjacent counties ===
- Muskogee County (north)
- Sequoyah County (northeast)
- Le Flore County (east)
- Latimer County (south)
- Pittsburg County (west)
- McIntosh County (northwest)

=== National protected area ===
- Sequoyah National Wildlife Refuge (part)

== Demographics ==
Historical population
Census	Pop.	Note	%±
1910	18,875		—
1920	19,397		2.8%
1930	16,216		−16.4%
1940	17,324		6.8%
1950	13,313		−23.2%
1960	9,121		−31.5%
1970	9,578		5.0%
1980	11,010		15.0%
1990	10,940		−0.6%
2000	11,792		7.8%
2010	12,769		8.3%
2020	11,561		−9.5%
2025 (est.)	11,787	▲	2.0%
U.S. Decennial Census; 1790-1960 1900-1990; 1990-2000 2010

=== 2020 census ===
As of the 2020 United States census, the county had a population of 11,561. Of the residents, 24.3% were under the age of 18 and 21.1% were 65 years of age or older; the median age was 41.8 years. For every 100 females there were 97.9 males, and for every 100 females age 18 and over there were 96.0 males.

The racial makeup of the county was 67.9% White, 0.6% Black or African American, 19.4% American Indian and Alaska Native, 0.2% Asian, 1.9% from some other race, and 9.9% from two or more races. Hispanic or Latino residents of any race comprised 4.6% of the population.

There were 4,556 households in the county, of which 31.1% had children under the age of 18 living with them and 25.2% had a female householder with no spouse or partner present. About 26.9% of all households were made up of individuals and 13.9% had someone living alone who was 65 years of age or older.

There were 5,646 housing units, of which 19.3% were vacant. Among occupied housing units, 75.7% were owner-occupied and 24.3% were renter-occupied. The homeowner vacancy rate was 2.1% and the rental vacancy rate was 10.3%.

=== 2010 census ===
As of the 2010 United States census, 12,769 people were living in the county; 74.9% were White, 15.9% Native American, 0.5% Asian, 0.4% Black or African American, 1.2% of some other race, and 7.0% of two or more races. About 3.3% were Hispanic or Latino (of any race), and 8.4% were of American, 7.3% German, 6.4% Irish and 5.0% English ancestry.

=== 2000 census ===
As of the census of 2000, 11,792 people, 4,624 households, and 3,380 families lived in the county. The population density was 20 people per square mile (7.7 people/km^{2}). The 5,573 housing units had an average density of 10 units per square mile (3.9/km^{2}). The racial makeup of the county was 78.24% White, 0.61% Black or African American, 14.60% Native American, 0.29% Asian, 0.45% from other races, and 5.81% from two or more races. About 1.50% of the population were Hispanics or Latinos of any race.

Of the 4,624 households, 31.7% had children under 18 living with them, 60.6% were married couples living together, 9.1% had a female householder with no husband present, and 26.9% were not families. About 24.7% of all households were made up of individuals, and 13.0% had someone living alone who was 65 or older. The average household size was 2.52 and the average family size was 3.00.

In the county, the age distribution was 26.0% under 18, 8.10% from 18 to 24, 24.50% from 25 to 44, 24.20% from 45 to 64, and 17.20% who were 65 or older. The median age was 39 years. For every 100 females, there were 95.7 males. For every 100 females 18 and over, there were 92.4 males.

The median income for a household in the county was $24,553, and for a family was $29,872. Males had a median income of $25,493 versus $17,462 for females. The per capita income for the county was $13,775. About 16.1% of families and 20.5% of the population were below the poverty line, including 25.1% of those under 18 and 18.6% of those 65 or over.

== Politics ==
Despite the county being home to a significant Native American population and a Democratic registration advantage well into the 2010s, Haskell County has not voted that way in presidential elections in the 21st century. Unlike other Native-administered counties, however, the rightward shift only increased after the 2004 election, with the GOP hitting well over 70% of the vote in the county in the Barack Obama era and topping out with 83.1% for Donald Trump in 2020.

Voter Registration and Party Enrollment as of June 30, 2023
Party	Number of Voters	Percentage
Democratic	2,549	37.31%
Republican	3,600	52.70%
Others	682	9.98%
Total	6,831	100%

United States presidential election results for Haskell County, Oklahoma
Year	Republican		Democratic		Third party(ies)	
Year	No.	%	No.	%	No.	%
1908	1,139	39.19%	1,401	48.21%	366	12.59%
1912	902	30.32%	1,388	46.66%	685	23.03%
1916	976	33.13%	1,486	50.44%	484	16.43%
1920	2,673	52.67%	2,201	43.37%	201	3.96%
1924	1,935	40.18%	2,480	51.50%	401	8.33%
1928	2,580	53.95%	2,172	45.42%	30	0.63%
1932	1,439	24.83%	4,357	75.17%	0	0.00%
1936	2,182	35.51%	3,961	64.47%	1	0.02%
1940	2,661	40.53%	3,896	59.34%	9	0.14%
1944	2,102	41.70%	2,924	58.00%	15	0.30%
1948	1,390	30.24%	3,206	69.76%	0	0.00%
1952	1,872	41.68%	2,619	58.32%	0	0.00%
1956	1,758	42.47%	2,381	57.53%	0	0.00%
1960	1,858	52.04%	1,712	47.96%	0	0.00%
1964	1,355	34.77%	2,542	65.23%	0	0.00%
1968	1,516	37.05%	1,563	38.20%	1,013	24.76%
1972	2,815	63.12%	1,408	31.57%	237	5.31%
1976	1,401	29.08%	3,388	70.32%	29	0.60%
1980	2,024	40.39%	2,874	57.35%	113	2.26%
1984	2,417	48.52%	2,535	50.89%	29	0.58%
1988	1,822	37.73%	2,963	61.36%	44	0.91%
1992	1,461	26.34%	3,069	55.34%	1,016	18.32%
1996	1,442	30.01%	2,762	57.48%	601	12.51%
2000	2,039	44.06%	2,510	54.24%	79	1.71%
2004	2,946	55.33%	2,378	44.67%	0	0.00%
2008	3,207	68.51%	1,474	31.49%	0	0.00%
2012	3,069	72.31%	1,175	27.69%	0	0.00%
2016	3,701	78.11%	882	18.62%	155	3.27%
2020	4,165	83.07%	783	15.62%	66	1.32%
2024	4,156	84.20%	718	14.55%	62	1.26%

== Communities ==
=== City ===
- Stigler (county seat)

=== Towns ===
- Keota
- Kinta
- McCurtain
- Tamaha
- Whitefield

=== Census-designated places ===
- Enterprise
- Hoyt
- Lequire

== Haskell County Courthouse ==
Stigler is home to the Haskell County Courthouse, which has become notable for erecting marble statues of the Ten Commandments and the Mayflower Compact on the front lawn (see Separation of church and state in the United States). In the seventh commandment, the word "adultery" is misspelled.

A unanimous federal appeals court ruled that county commissioners in Haskell County unconstitutionally sought to promote their personal religious beliefs by erecting a Ten Commandments monument on the front lawn of the county's courthouse. The decision by the U.S. Tenth Circuit Court of Appeals comes in a challenge filed by the American Civil Liberties Union and the ACLU of Oklahoma on behalf of a local resident.

After the court decision, the marble statue was moved about 600 feet east to private property. Therefore, the statue was still displayed on the main street, available to anyone who desired to view and read the information.

== NRHP sites ==
The following sites in Haskell County are listed on the National Register of Historic Places:

- Cotton Storage House, Kinta
- Haskell County Courthouse, Stigler
- Kinta High School, Kinta
- McCurtain, Edmund, House, Kinta
- McCurtain, Green, House, Kinta
- Mule Creek Site, Stigler
- Otter Creek Archeological Site, Keota
- Scott Store, Kinta
- Stigler School Gymnasium--Auditorium, Stigler
- Tamaha Jail and Ferry Landing, Stigler
