= Stig (given name) =

- Gender: Male
- Language: Scandinavian

Origin
- Meaning: "Wanderer"

Stig (also spelled Stieg) is a common masculine Scandinavian given name. The name has origins in Old West Norse Stígr, and derives from the word stiga, meaning "wanderer". Originally a nickname, it later became a given name. The nicknames Stickan and Stikkan derive from Stig.

Notable people with the name Stig include:

== Arts and entertainment ==
=== Writing ===
- Stig Dagerman (1923–1954), Swedish author and journalist
- Stig Dalager (born 1952), Danish writer
- Stig Gælok (born 1961), Sámi poet
- Stieg Larsson (1954–2004), Swedish journalist and writer
- Stig Larsson (author) (born 1955), Swedish writer, film writer, director and actor
- Stig Sæterbakken (1966–2012), Norwegian author

=== Film and television ===
- Stig Egede-Nissen (1907–1988), Norwegian actor and naval officer
- Stig Järrel (1910–1998), Swedish actor, film director and revue artist
- Stig Olin (1920–2008), Swedish actor, theatre director, singer and songwriter

=== Music ===
- Stig Anderson (1931–1997), manager of the Swedish band ABBA
- Stig Johansen, member of the band The Sins of Thy Beloved
- Stig Olin (1920–2008), Swedish actor, theatre director, singer, and songwriter
- Stig Rästa (born 1980), Estonian musician

=== Other arts and entertainment ===
- Stig Asmussen, American video game developer
- Stig Lindberg (1916–1982), Swedish designer

== Government, politics and espionage ==
- Stig Bergelin (1905–1983), Swedish Navy rear admiral
- Stig Bergling (1937–2015), Swedish police officer and convicted Soviet agent
- Stig Henriksson (born 1955), Swedish politician
- Stig Even Lillestøl (born 1996), Norwegian politician
- Stig Löfgren (1912–1998), Swedish Army lieutenant general
- Per Stig Møller (born 1942), Danish politician
- Stig Synnergren (1915–2004), Supreme Commander of the Swedish Armed Forces
- Stig Wennerström (1906–2006), Swedish Air Force colonel, convicted of treason in 1963

== Sports ==
=== Football (soccer) ===
- Stig Inge Bjørnebye (born 1969), Norwegian footballer
- Stig Fredriksson (born 1956), Swedish footballer
- Stig Johansen (born 1972), Norwegian footballer
- Stig Arild Råket (born 1978), Norwegian footballer
- Stig Tøfting (born 1969), Danish footballer

=== Other sports ===
- Stig Berge (born 1942), Norwegian orienteer
- Stig Blomqvist (born 1946), Swedish rally driver
- Stig Roar Husby (born 1954), Norwegian long-distance runner
- Stig Severinsen (born 1973), Danish freediver
- Stig Strand (born 1956), Swedish skier
- Stig Wennerström (sailor) (born 1943), Swedish Olympic silver medalist in sailing
- Stig Wetzell (born 1945), Finnish ice hockey player

== Other fields ==
- Stig M. Bergström (born 1935), Swedish-American paleontologist
- Stig Guldberg (1916–1980), Danish founder of the Guldberg-Plan
- Stig Andersen Hvide (died 1293), Danish nobleman and magnate
- Stig Strömholm (born 1931), Swedish legal scholar
- Stig Vilhelmson (born 1956), Swedish businessman

== See also ==
- Security Technical Implementation Guide (STIG)
