= Kinta, Oklahoma =

- Town
- Location within Oklahoma
- Coordinates: 35°07′10″N 95°14′16″W
- Country: United States
- State: Oklahoma
- County: Haskell

Area
  - Total: 0.64 sq mi (1.65 km^{2})
  - Land: 0.63 sq mi (1.63 km^{2})
  - Water: 0.012 sq mi (0.03 km^{2})
- Elevation: 551 ft (168 m)

Population (2020)
  - Total: 285
  - Density: 453.5/sq mi (175.09/km^{2})
- Time zone: UTC-6 (Central (CST))
  - Summer (DST): UTC-5 (CDT)
- ZIP code: 74552
- Area codes: 539/918
- FIPS code: 40-39950
- GNIS feature ID: 2412837

Kinta is a town in Haskell County, Oklahoma, United States. As of the 2020 census, Kinta had a population of 285.

== History ==
Kinta was founded in 1901 by George W. Scott, son-in-law of Greenwood McCurtain, the last chief of the Choctaw Nation before Oklahoma became a state. At the time of its founding, Kinta was located in the Moshulatubbee District of the Choctaw Nation. Scott named the town for nearby Beaver Creek, the name Kinta being the Choctaw word for "beaver." He moved his store to Kinta from Sans Bois, established a post office in his store, and built the first permanent building in town in 1903. Sans Bois was then the Choctaw capital, but had been bypassed by the Fort Smith and Western Railroad.

Historical population
Census	Pop.	Note	%±
1920	393		—
1930	259		−34.1%
1940	221		−14.7%
1950	283		28.1%
1960	233		−17.7%
1970	247		6.0%
1980	303		22.7%
1990	233		−23.1%
2000	243		4.3%
2010	297		22.2%
2020	285		−4.0%
U.S. Decennial Census

During the first three decades of the 20th century, the town economy was supported by coal mining and the production of wood products. When these two industries declined sharply in the 1930s, the railroad ceased operations, and the town nearly failed too. But Kinta survived somehow, and by the start of the 21st century, the major employer was the Kinta Public School System, including the Kinta High School.

== Geography ==
Kinta is 40 miles (64 km) east of McAlester and 56 miles (90 km) south of Muskogee.

According to the United States Census Bureau, the town has a total area of 0.6 square miles (1.6 km^{2}), all land.

== Demographics ==
=== 2020 census ===
As of the 2020 census, Kinta had a population of 285. The median age was 33.9 years. 29.8% of residents were under the age of 18 and 19.3% of residents were 65 years of age or older. For every 100 females there were 95.2 males, and for every 100 females age 18 and over there were 98.0 males age 18 and over.

0.0% of residents lived in urban areas, while 100.0% lived in rural areas.

There were 103 households in Kinta, of which 48.5% had children under the age of 18 living in them. Of all households, 52.4% were married-couple households, 13.6% were households with a male householder and no spouse or partner present, and 26.2% were households with a female householder and no spouse or partner present. About 21.4% of all households were made up of individuals and 7.8% had someone living alone who was 65 years of age or older.

There were 123 housing units, of which 16.3% were vacant. The homeowner vacancy rate was 0.0% and the rental vacancy rate was 12.1%.

=== 2000 census ===
As of the census of 2000, there were 243 people, 104 households, and 68 families residing in the town. The population density was 388.2 inhabitants per square mile (149.9/km^{2}). There were 131 housing units at an average density of 209.3 per square mile (80.8/km^{2}). The racial makeup of the town was 82.72% White, 12.35% Native American, 0.41% from other races, and 4.53% from two or more races. Hispanic or Latino of any race were 0.82% of the population.

There were 104 households, out of which 26.9% had children under the age of 18 living with them, 55.8% were married couples living together, 6.7% had a female householder with no husband present, and 33.7% were non-families. 29.8% of all households were made up of individuals, and 20.2% had someone living alone who was 65 years of age or older. The average household size was 2.34 and the average family size was 2.91.

In the town, the population was spread out, with 22.6% under the age of 18, 9.5% from 18 to 24, 25.1% from 25 to 44, 22.6% from 45 to 64, and 20.2% who were 65 years of age or older. The median age was 39 years. For every 100 females, there were 92.9 males. For every 100 females age 18 and over, there were 77.4 males.

The median income for a household in the town was $26,111, and the median income for a family was $32,083. Males had a median income of $25,625 versus $13,750 for females. The per capita income for the town was $13,960. About 8.5% of families and 10.3% of the population were below the poverty line, including 3.2% of those under the age of eighteen and 33.3% of those 65 or over.

Racial composition as of the 2020 census
Race	Number	Percent
White	176	61.8%
Black or African American	1	0.4%
American Indian and Alaska Native	51	17.9%
Asian	3	1.1%
Native Hawaiian and Other Pacific Islander	1	0.4%
Some other race	0	0.0%
Two or more races	53	18.6%
Hispanic or Latino (of any race)	7	2.5%

== NRHP sites ==
NRHP sites in Kinta include the Cotton Storage House, the Kinta High School, the Edmund McCurtain House, the Green McCurtain House, and the Scott Store (the latter apparently no longer extant).

== Notable person ==
- Green McCurtain (1848–1910), Principal Chief of the Choctaw Nation (1896-1900 and 1902-1910)
