= Treaty of Tellico =

1798 treaty between the U.S. and Cherokees

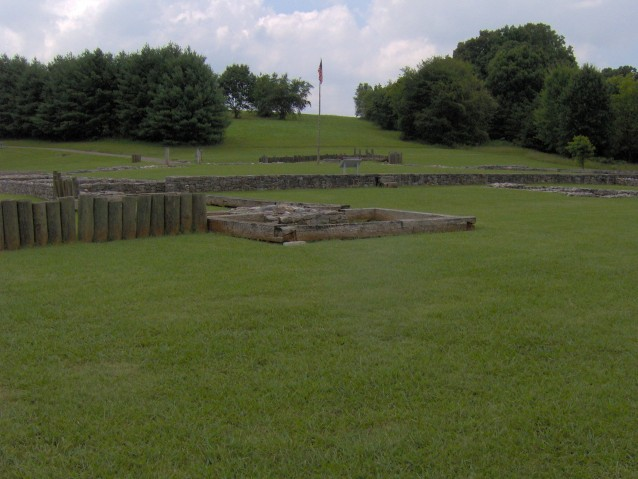
The Tellico Blockhouse site, located at the junction of Nine Mile Creek and the Little Tennessee River (now Tellico Lake). The Treaty of Tellico was signed here in 1798

The Treaty With The Cherokee, 1798, also known as the First Treaty of Tellico, was signed on October 2, 1798, in the Overhill Cherokee settlement of Great Tellico near Tellico Blockhouse in Tennessee. This treaty served as an addendum to the Treaty of Holston and was the only treaty between the United States and Native Americans executed during the administration of President John Adams.

The treaty was signed by Thomas Butler and George Walton, commissioners of the United States, and some thirty-nine Cherokee chiefs and warriors, in the presence of Silas Dinsmoor, Agent of the United States among the Cherokee, and thirteen other witnesses, including Charles R. Hicks, who served as interpreter.

Cherokee leaders present included Bloody Fellow, Little Turkey, Taken Out of Water, Doublehead, and Tahlonteskee.

== Terms ==
Preamble The treaty begins with a long preamble, stating the reasons why it was necessary to make another treaty. Among the reasons cited are these two clauses; viz. "for the purpose of doing justice to the Cherokee Nation of Indians" and "in order to promote the interest and safety of the said States."

Article 1. Peace renewed and declared perpetual.

Article 2. The treaties subsisting between the parties in full force; "together with the construction and usage under the respective articles; and so to continue."

Article 3. Limits and boundaries of the Cherokee nation to remain the same, "where not altered by the present treaty."

Article 4. The Cherokee Nation "do hereby relinquish and cede to the United States all the lands within the following points and lines:" [Here follows a boundary, by which a considerable district of land, now in East Tennessee, was ceded to the United States.]

Article 5. The line described in the treaty to be marked immediately, "which said line shall form a part of the boundary between the United States and the Cherokee Nation."

Article 6. In consideration of the preceding cession, the United States agree to pay $5,000 on signing, and $1,000 annually, in addition to previous stipulations of this kind; "and will continue the guarantee of the remainder of their country forever, as made and contained in former treaties."

Article 7. The "Kentucky road, running between the Cumberland mountain and the Cumberland river" across a small corner of Cherokee country, "shall be an open and free road for the use of the citizens of the United States"; and in consideration of this grant, "until settlements shall make such hunting improper", the Cherokees are to be permitted "to hunt and take game upon the lands relinquished and ceded by this treaty."

Article 8. Due notice to be given of the payment of the annual stipends, and the United States to furnish provisions for a "reasonable" number of Cherokees, who shall assemble on these occasions.

Article 9. Horses stolen from Cherokees by whites to be paid for by the United States; and horses stolen from whites by Cherokees, to be paid for by a deduction from the annuity.

Article 10. The Agent of the United States residing among the Cherokees to have a sufficient piece of ground allotted "for his temporary use" and the provision that this treaty was to "be carried into effect on both sides with all good faith."

== See also ==
- List of United States treaties
- Cherokee treaties
