= List of Choctaw treaties =

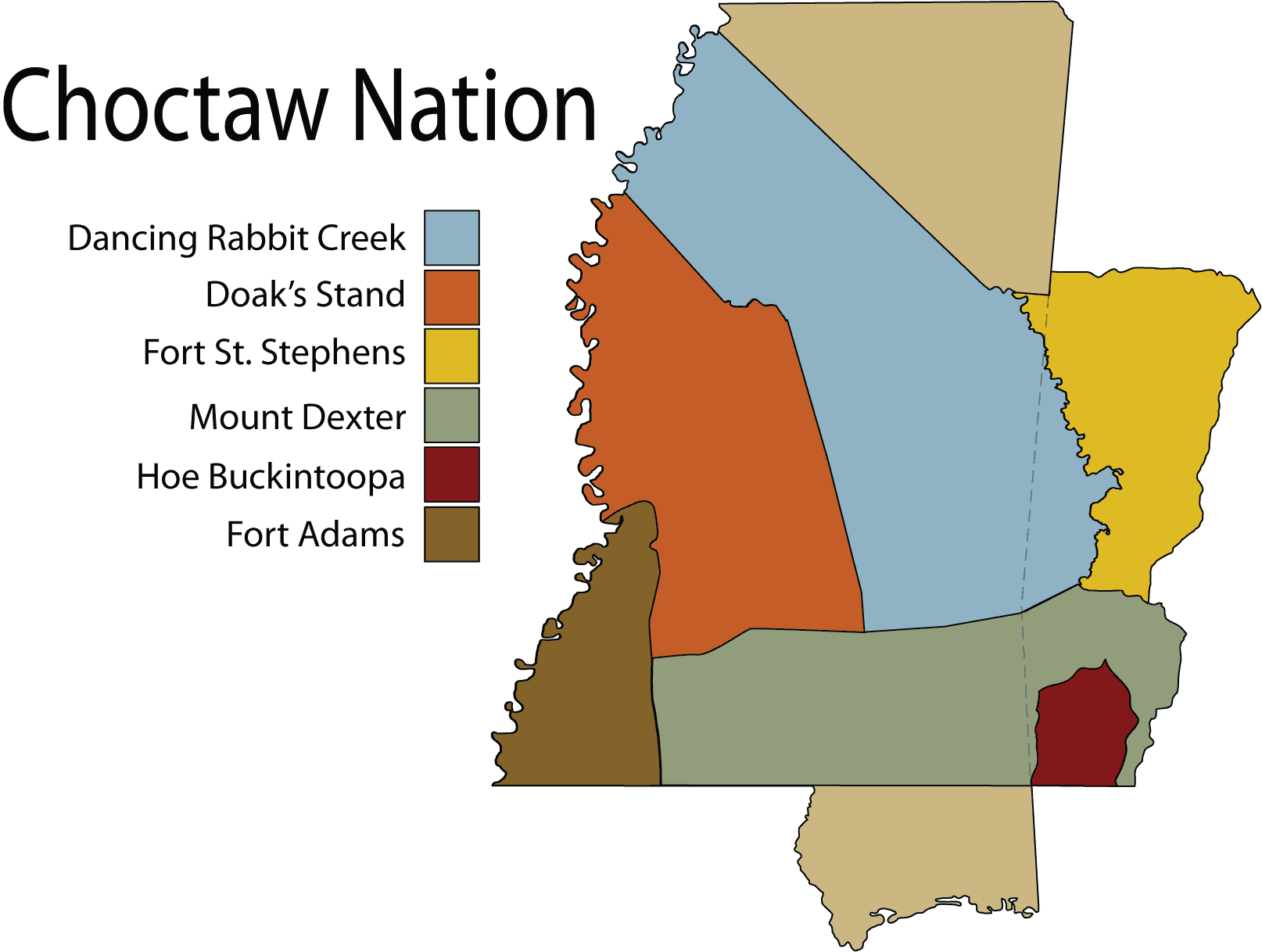
The entire Choctaw Nation divided up by treaty in relation to the U.S. state of Mississippi

List of Choctaw treaties is a comprehensive chronological list of historic agreements that directly or indirectly affected the Choctaw people, a Native American tribe, with other nations. Choctaw land was systematically obtained through treaties, legislation, and threats of warfare. Treaties were made with Great Britain, France, and Spain. Nine treaties were signed with the United States. Some treaties, like the Treaty of San Lorenzo, indirectly affected the Choctaws.

The Choctaws considered European laws and diplomacy foreign and puzzling. The most confusing aspect of treaty-making was writing, which was impressive for a people who had not developed a written system. Choctaw history, as with many Native Americans, was passed orally from generation to generation. European cultural conventions require written treaties to prevent disputes about the contents of the agreement and to enable wider dissemination through copying. During treaty negotiations, the three main Choctaw tribal areas (Upper Towns, Six town, and Lower Towns) had a "Miko" (chief) to represent them. Spain had the earliest claims to Choctaw country, which was followed by French claims starting in the late 17th century. The United States, following the Treaty of San Lorenzo, laid claim to Choctaw country starting in 1795.

By the early 19th century, pressure from U.S. southern states, like Georgia, encouraged the procurement of Native American lands. The Treaty of Fort Adams was the first in a series of treaties that ceded Choctaw lands. The Choctaws were relocated from their homeland, now known as the Deep South, to lands west of the Mississippi River. Approximately 15,000 Choctaws made the move to what would be called Indian Territory and then later Oklahoma. About 2,500 died along the trail of tears. The Treaty of Dancing Rabbit Creek required the Choctaws to sign away the remaining traditional homeland to the United States. There would be three waves of removals starting in 1831. After the final wave of removal in 1833, nearly 6,000 Choctaws chose to stay in the newly formed state of Mississippi. Despite the grant of citizenship and land to Choctaws that chose to stay, the newly settled European-Americans persistently urged the Mississippi Choctaws to remove, but they refused. Although smaller Choctaw groups can be found throughout the U.S. south, Choctaws are mainly found in Florida, Oklahoma and Mississippi.

== Treaties ==
Treaty	Year	Signed with	Location	Purpose	Ceded land
Charleston	1738	Great Britain	Charleston, SC	Trade and Alliance	n/a
Mobile	1749	France	Mobile, AL	Trade and Alliance	n/a
Grandpre	1750	France	Choctaw Nation	Ended Choctaw Civil War	n/a
Augusta	1763	Georgia	Augusta, GA	Established "Indian/White" boundaries	n/a
Mobile	1783	Great Britain	Mobile, AL	Land Cession, Boundaries defined	n/a
Mobile	1783	Spain	Mobile, AL	Trade and Alliance	n/a
Charleston	1783	Great Britain	Charleston, SC	Trade and Amity	n/a
Pensacola	1784	Spain	Pensacola, FL	Trade and Alliance	n/a
Hopewell	1786	United States	Hopwell, SC	U.S. to serve as protectorate, Choctaw Nation boundaries defined	n/a
Natchez	1792	Spain	Natchez	Peace, Choctaw, Chickasaw and Cherokees Nations boundaries defined	n/a
San Lorenzo	1795	Between Spain and United States	San Lorenzo de El Escorial, Spain	The treaty, without Choctaw participation, put Choctaw country under U.S. control	n/a
Fort Adams	1801	United States	Mississippi Territory	Re-defined Choctaw cession to England and permission for Natchez Trace	2,641,920 acres (10,691.5 km^{2})
Fort Confederation	1802	United States	Mississippi Territory	Boundary re-defined, and lands ceded	10,000 acres (40 km^{2})
Hoe Buckintoopa	1803	United States	Choctaw Nation	Small cession of Tombigbee River and redefined English treaty of 1765	853,760 acres (3,455.0 km^{2})
Mount Dexter	1805	United States	Choctaw Nation (Mississippi)	Large cession from Natchez District to the Tombigbee Alabama River watershed	4,142,720 acres (16,765.0 km^{2})
Fort St. Stephens	1816	United States	Fort St. Stephens (Alabama)	Ceded all Choctaw land east of Tombigbee River	10,000 acres (40 km^{2})
Doak's Stand	1820	United States	Natchez Trace, Choctaw Nation (Mississippi)	Exchanged cession in Mississippi for parcel in Arkansas and prepare the Choctaws to become citizens of the United States	5,169,788 acres (20,921.39 km^{2})
Washington City	1825	United States	Washington, D.C.	Exchanged Arkansas land for Oklahoma parcel	2,000,000 acres (8,100 km^{2})
Dancing Rabbit Creek	1830	United States	Choctaw Nation (Mississippi)	Removal and granting U.S. citizenship	10,523,130 acres (42,585.6 km^{2})
Comanche	1835	United States	Muscogee Nation (Indian Territory)	Peace and friendship among various tribes	n/a
Bowles Village	1836	Republic of Texas	Texas Cherokees and Twelve Associated Bands-Yowani Choctaw (Texas)	Acquisition of Title for east Texas lands based upon previous 1822 Mexican grant	1,500,000 acres (6,100 km^{2})
Choctaws and Chickasaws	1861	Confederate States of America	Creek Nation (Indian Territory)	Serve as protectorate, admit Indian Nations as Confederate states	n/a
Choctaw and Chickasaws	1866	United States	Washington, D.C	Besides granting amnesty for past crimes against the U.S. Government, this treaty also encourages the Choctaws and Chickasaws to seek cooperation from the plains Indians to the west.	n/a

== Indian Appropriations Act of 1871 ==
In 1871 Congress added a rider to the Indian Appropriations Act to end the United States' recognizing additional Indian tribes or nations, and prohibiting additional treaties.

That hereafter no Indian nation or tribe within the territory of the United States shall be acknowledged or recognized as an independent nation, tribe, or power with whom the United States may contract by treaty: Provided, further, that nothing herein contained shall be construed to invalidate or impair the obligation of any treaty heretofore lawfully made and ratified with any such Indian nation or tribe.

— Indian Appropriations Act of 1871

== See also ==
- Choctaw Trail of Tears
- Treaty of Hopewell
- Treaty of Washington City
- Treaty of Doak's Stand
- Treaty of Dancing Rabbit Creek
- Yowani Choctaws
- List of treaties
