= Treaty of Fort Confederation =

1802 treaty between the United States and Choctaw

The Treaty of Fort Confederation was signed on October 17, 1802, between the Choctaw (an American Indian tribe) and the United States Government. The treaty ceded about 10,000 acres (40 km^{2}) of Choctaw land, including the site of Fort Tombecbe, also known as Fort Confederation.

== Terms ==
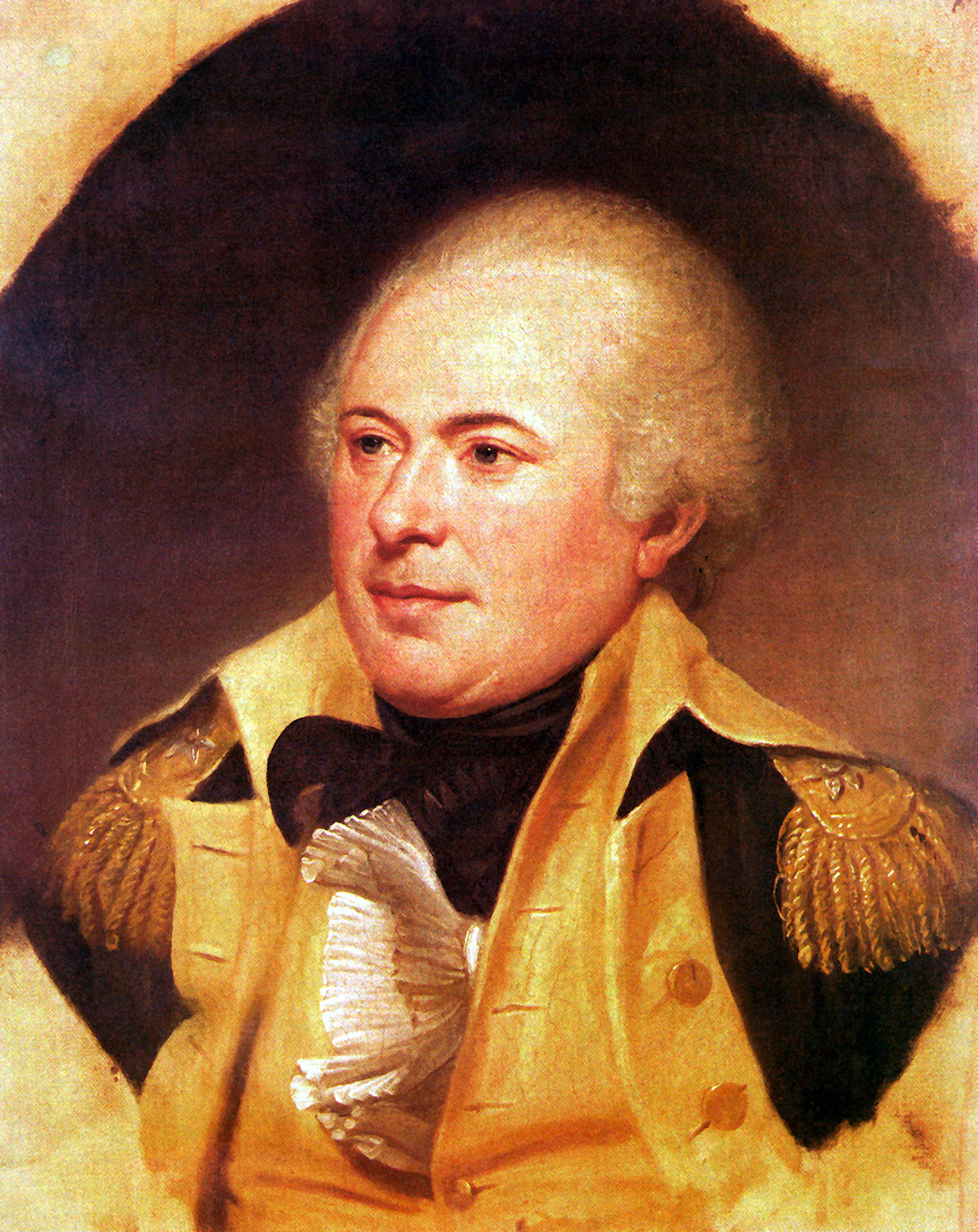
General James Wilkinson

The preamble begins with.

For the mutual accommodation of the parties, and to perpetuate that concord and friendship, which so happily subsists between them, they do hereby freely, voluntarily, and without constraint, covenant and agree, ...

— Treaty of Fort Confederation, 1802

1. Boundary lines to be re-mark
2. Title to lands released to the U.S.
3. Alteration of old boundary
4. When the treaty will take effect

== Signatories ==
James Wilkinson, Tuskona Hoopoio, Mingo Pooskoos, Poosha Matthaw, Oak Chummy, Tuskee Maiaby, Latalahomah, Mooklahoosoopoieh, Mingo Hom Astubby, Tuskahoma, Silas Dinsmoor (Agent to the Choctaws), John Pitchlynn, Turner Brashears, Peter H. Marsalis, and John Long.

== See also ==
- List of Choctaw Treaties
- Treaty of Hopewell
- Treaty of Fort Adams
- Treaty of Hoe Buckintoopa
- Treaty of Mount Dexter
- Treaty of Fort St. Stephens
- Treaty of Doak's Stand
- Treaty of Washington City
- Treaty of Dancing Rabbit Creek
- List of treaties
