= Silas Dinsmoor =

American Indian agent (1766–1847)

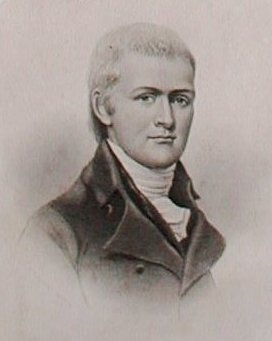
Silas Dinsmoor (1766-1847)

Silas Dinsmoor (September 26, 1766 – June 17, 1847) was an appointed U.S. Agent to the Cherokee (1794–1798) and to the Choctaw (1801–1813). He later served as a surveyor in Alabama before eventually retiring to Boone County, Kentucky, where he is buried at the Dinsmore Homestead.

== Early life ==
Born in Windham, New Hampshire, Silas Dinsmoor was of Scots-Irish descent. Dinsmoor was part of a large group of inter-related families who settled in southern New Hampshire in the early 1700s. Through his mother, Martha McKeen, he was related to Joseph McKeen, the first president of Bowdoin College in Maine. Dinsmoor was also a first cousin of Pennsylvania Governor Thomas McKean, a signer of the Declaration of Independence. Silas worked his way through Dartmouth College by teaching, a profession he continued practicing after graduation. At nearby Atkinson Academy, he taught a newly formed co-educational class of students, allowing young ladies to learn Logic, Greek, and Rhetoric - traditionally reserved for male students.

== As agent to the Indians ==
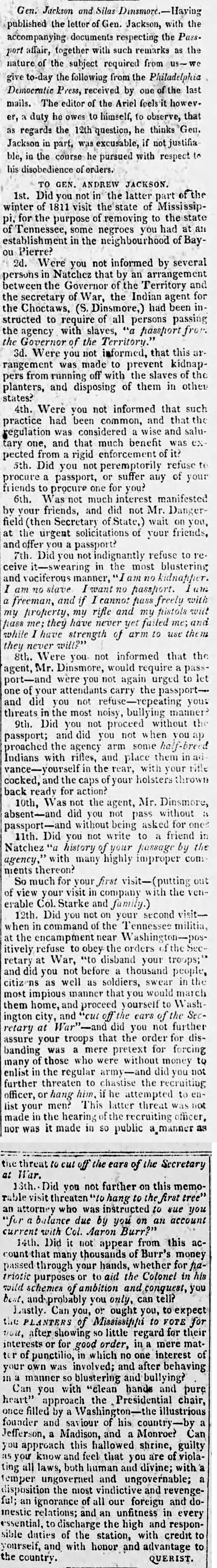
The incident with Jackson became a political issue during the 1828 presidential election, here a columnist called Querist is just asking questions about if Jackson threatened to cut off the ears of the Secretary of War ("Gen. Jackson and Silas Dinsmore" The Ariel, Natchez, Mississippi, June 7, 1828)

In 1793, Dinsmoor traveled to Philadelphia to look for a position with the government. Dinsmoor was offered the appointment of United States Agent to the Cherokee by President George Washington, a job that would last the next four years. In that capacity, Dinsmoor was expected to keep peace between the Cherokee and white settlers, serve as treaty commissioner, and introduce "civilization" to the Cherokee. This last task meant that Dinsmoor attempted to coax Cherokee men to take up farming, traditionally the occupation of Cherokee women, and to teach Cherokee women to plant cotton, spin, and weave textiles. Dinsmoor spent much of his time at Tellico Blockhouse (in present-day Tennessee). As the agent, Dinsmoor witnessed the First Treaty of Tellico, signed in 1798 between the U.S. Government and tribal leaders, which signed away land in eastern Tennessee. Silas wrote to his brother then, "The Cherokees know the worth of their land too well to sell it for a song or anything under the value."

In 1798, when his term expired, Dinsmoor again went to Philadelphia in hopes of another post. Instead, in 1799, he accepted the job of purser on the naval frigate USS George Washington. In that capacity, he sailed with the ship on a historic mission, it being the first U.S. warship to enter the Mediterranean Sea. Under the command of William Bainbridge, the frigate was sent to Algiers with trade items and tribute for the Barbary pirates. When they arrived in Algiers, the Dey ordered the Americans to carry (under the flag of Algiers) an ambassador, several enslaved people, and exotic animals to Constantinople for the Sultan of Turkey.

Returning to the states, President Thomas Jefferson appointed Dinsmoor as Agent to the Choctaw, and he proceeded to the tiny outpost of Washington, Mississippi Territory, located at the southern end of the Natchez Trace. It was presumed Dinsmoor would carry out a similar set of tasks as before, expecting to encourage the Choctaw to cede large sections of their land to the U.S. government. Again, the Choctaw were unwilling to give up their most valuable lands. The Treaty of Mount Dexter, signed in 1805, sold away more than four million acres of Choctaw land in southeastern Mississippi and parts of Alabama; this angered Jefferson because he wanted more valuable lands along the Mississippi River. Dinsmoor also witnessed the Treaty of Fort St. Stephens of 1816 and the Treaty of Doak's Stand of 1820. By this time, though, he was no longer serving as an agent.

In 1811, Dinsmoor found himself embroiled in a controversy with Andrew Jackson, and by 1813, he was looking for a new government post. The controversy began with reports from the Natchez region that enslaved people were being encouraged to run away by traders from Tennessee. Dinsmoor was asked to protect the property of the local planters, and he began instituting an often-ignored requirement that anyone traveling the Natchez Trace carry papers with them proving their ownership of any enslaved people they claimed. Jackson refused to do so and became quite furious when he heard Dinsmoor was vigorously enforcing the rule, at one point threatening to arm the people he enslaved on his next time through, kill Dinsmoor, and burn the agency house to the ground. Though he never found the right moment to carry out his threat, his messages to the War Department may have had something to do with Dinsmoor being replaced in 1813.

Dinsmoor was elected a member of the American Antiquarian Society in 1813.

=== Choctaw Agency ===
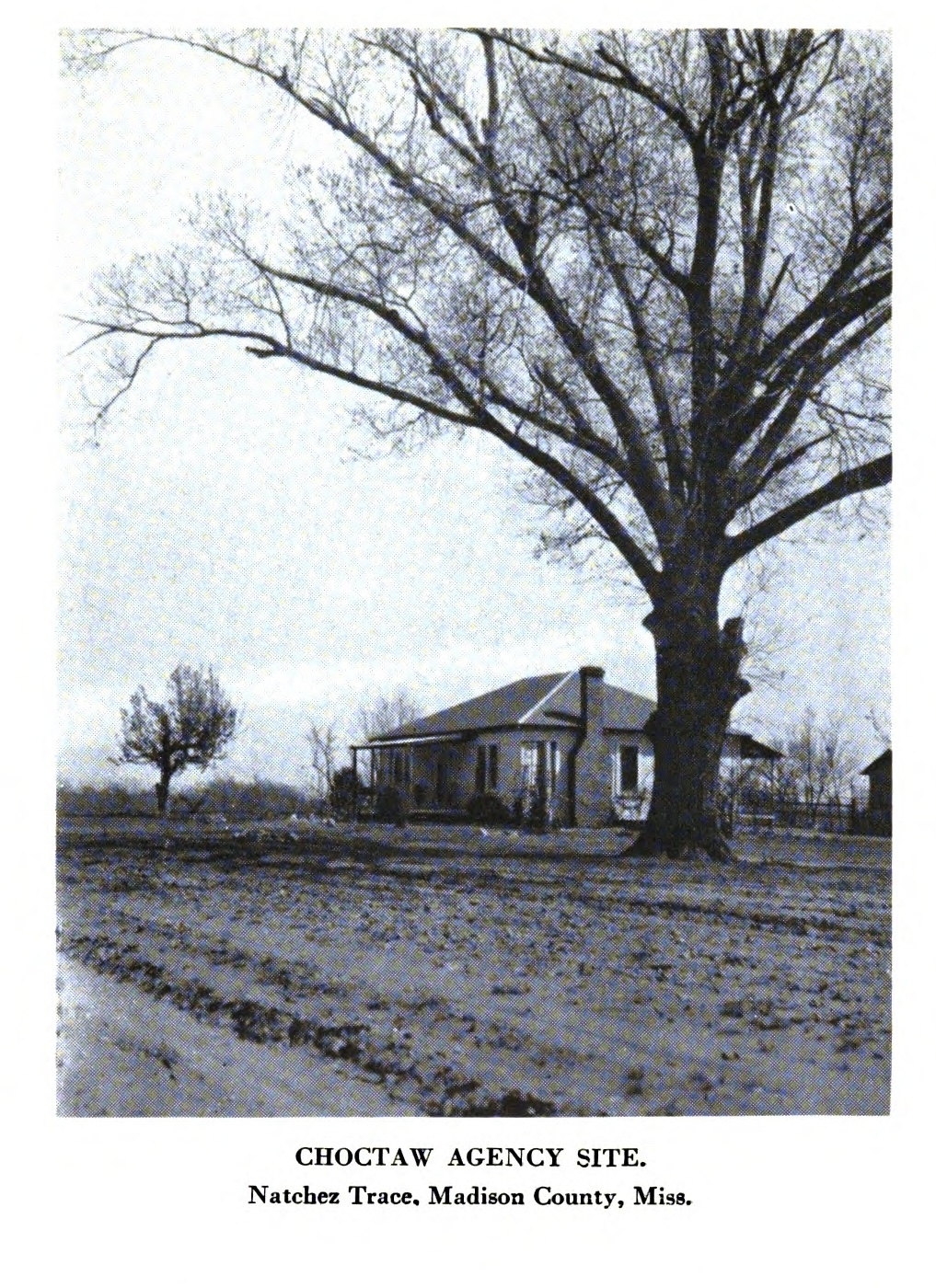
Site of Choctaw Agency in Madison County Mississippi, photographed c. 1938

Old Natchez Trace and Choctaw Agency Site, in Ridgeland, Mississippi located at milepost 100.7. This is located between Interstate 55 and Livingston Rd., west of Ridgeland, in Madison County, Mississippi. It includes a 3.3-mile segment of the Natchez Trace (partially in the Natchez Trace Parkway right of way) and an archeological investigation site at the location that from 1811 to 1823 housed a government agency to the Choctaw. According to the 1941 Natchez Trace Parkway survey report, "Before the Treaty of Doak's Stand, the Choctaw Agency was located on the Trace, about 10 miles north of what is now Jackson, or about two miles west of Ridgeland on United States Highway 51. The Agency is not different from other Indian agencies in its historical background. It was the residence of the United States Agent, who, in addition to numerous other duties, for a time at least, checked the passports of travelers over the Trace. Before the inns were established on the Trace, the agencies were havens for the sick and weary travelers. The Choctaw Agency is closely associated with the history of the Trace. No remains of the old agency exist but a modern dwelling marks the site."

== Later life ==
Dinsmoor moved with his wife, Mary Gordon, and children to St. Stephens, the capital of the Alabama Territory, and then to Mobile. He served as a principal surveyor for the land office in New Orleans. Again, he had personal troubles with his superior, George Davis, and was let go. Suffering financially from unpaid wages and a debt he had incurred as security for a friend, he was forced to go to Washington, D.C. in 1826 to plead for money. While he was away from Mobile, he learned of the death of a son and the burning of the bank where he had stored his valuable surveying journals, business papers, and a silver sword Washington had presented to him during a visit to Mount Vernon in 1798.

In 1829, he moved to Cincinnati, Ohio, and a year later, he purchased land in Boone County, Kentucky. The approximately 100-acre purchase included an orchard, a cabin, and Loughery Island in the Ohio River. He lived here with his wife and son, Thomas, until he died in 1847. He was buried in the family graveyard of his nephew, James Dinsmore, which is now part of the Dinsmore Homestead. The papers he left are housed at Dartmouth.

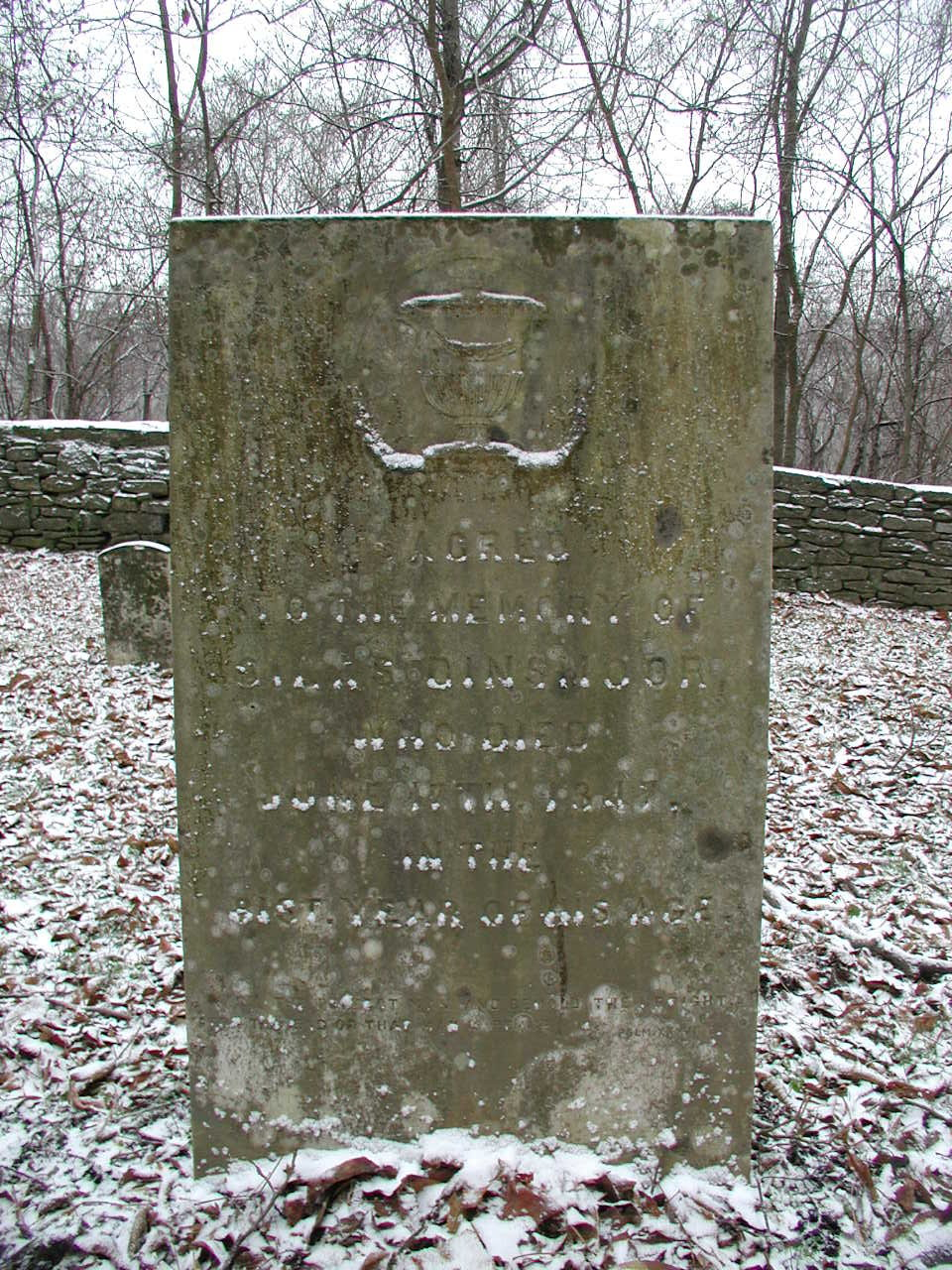
Dinsmoor's gravestone at the Dinsmore Homestead

== See also ==
- Andrew Jackson and the slave trade in the United States
