= Treaty of Mount Dexter =

1805 treaty between the United States and Choctaw

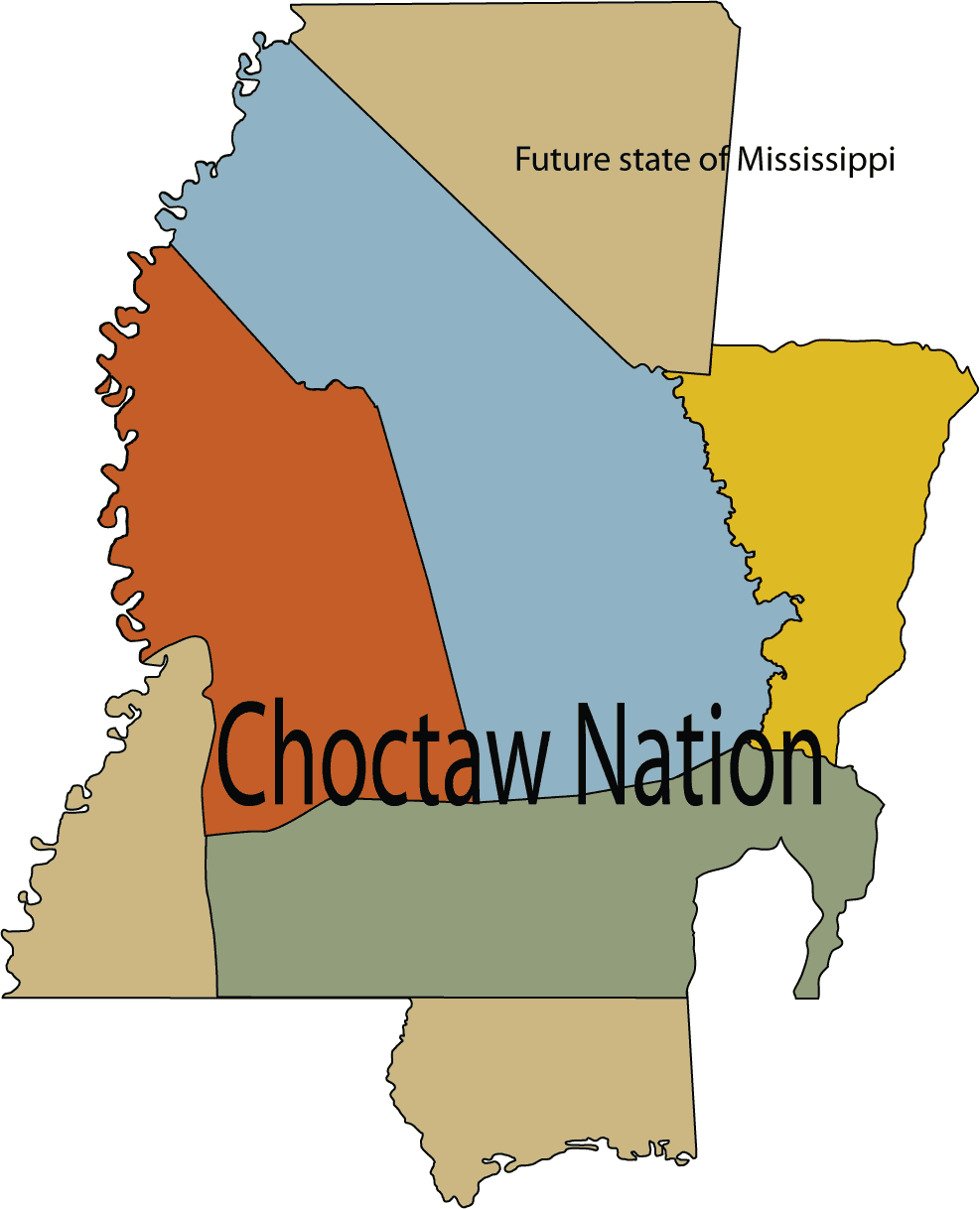
The approximate area to be ceded shaded in green in relation to the future U.S. state of Mississippi.

The Treaty of Mount Dexter was signed between the United States and the Choctaws. The treaty was signed November 16, 1805. The 4,142,720-acre (16,765.0 km^{2}) area ceded was from the Natchez District to the Tombigbee Alabama River watershed, mostly in present-day Mississippi.

== Terms ==
The preamble begins with,

THOMAS JEFFERSON, President of the United States of America, by James Robertson, of Tennessee, and Silas Dinsmoor, of New Hampshire, agent of the United States to the Chaktaws [Choctaw], commissioners plenipotentiary of the United States, on the one part, and the Mingoes, Chiefs and warriors of the Chaktaw nation of Indians, in council assembled, on the other part, have entered into the following agreement...

— Treaty of Mount Dexter, 1805

1. Cession to the United States. Reservation.
2. Consideration.
3. Payment to certain Indians for past services.
4. Claim of John M'Grew.
5. Boundaries.
6. A certain former grant confirmed.
7. When to take effect.

== Significance ==
This treaty conveyed large amounts of land in what is now southeastern Mississippi and southwestern Alabama, including much of the western portion of Clarke County, Alabama, to the United States.

In February, 1809, a survey was begun to establish the actual boundary lines between the United States and the Choctaw Nation. The United States contracted with Silas Dinsmoor and Levin Wailes for this survey. Levin Wailes produced a map "Map of a tract of land containing 5120 acres, granted by the mingoes and chiefs of the Chaktaw nation of Indians, in a treaty concluded at Mount Dexter on the 16th day of November in the year 1805".

== Signatories ==
The main signers included James Robertson, Silas Dinsmoor, Pukshunnubbee, Mingo Hoomastubbee, and Pushmataha.

== See also ==
- List of Choctaw Treaties
- Treaty of Hopewell
- Treaty of Fort Adams
- Treaty of Fort Confederation
- Treaty of Hoe Buckintoopa
- Treaty of Fort St. Stephens
- Treaty of Doak's Stand
- Treaty of Washington City
- Treaty of Dancing Rabbit Creek
- List of treaties
- Choctaw Corner
