= Treaty of Fort Adams =

1801 treaty between the United States and Choctaw

"A Survey of the Route, proposed for the high way from Nashville in the State of Tennessee, to the Grind stone ford of the Bayou Pierre in the Mississippi Territory"

Natchez Trace and boundary survey in the vicinity of Tennessee River

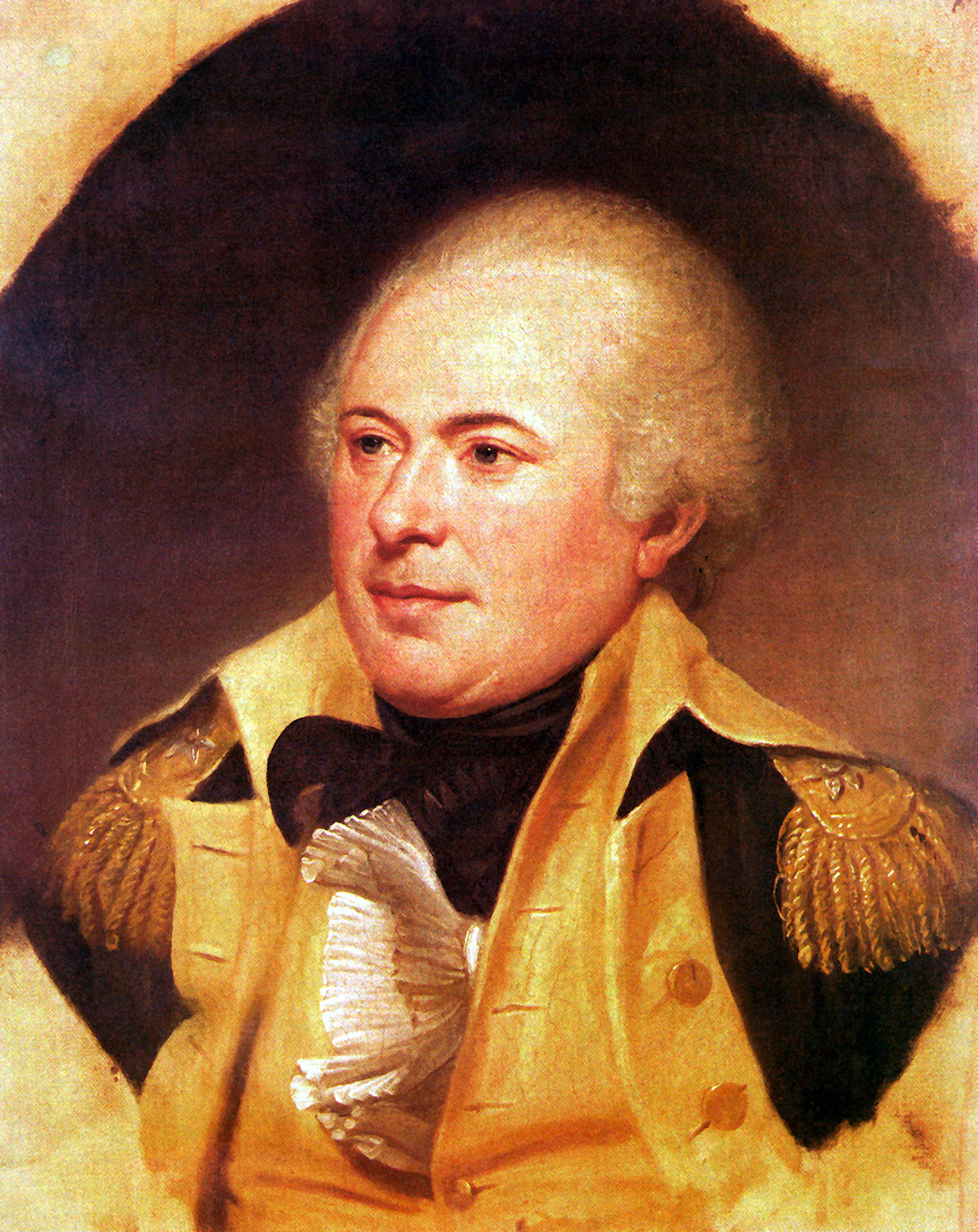
General James Wilkinson

The Treaty of Fort Adams was signed on December 17, 1801, between the Choctaw (an American Indian tribe) and the United States Government. The treaty ceded about 2,641,920 acres (10,691.5 km^{2}) of Choctaw land. The commissioners reported to President Thomas Jefferson that

for the first time, the bounty of the United States was implored, and we were supplicated for materials, tools, implements, and instructors, to aid their exertions, and to direct their labors ... hope, that by the liberal and well directed attention of the Government, these people may be made happy and useful; and that the United States may be saved the pain and expense of expelling or destroying them.

== Significance for the Choctaw Nation ==
Although the treaty was originally designed for the creation of the Natchez Trace, it would be the first in a series of treaties that would eventually lead to the expulsion of the Choctaw Nation east of the Mississippi River.

== Terms ==
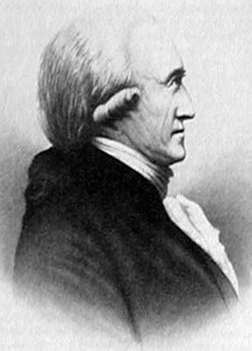
U.S. Senator Benjamin Hawkins

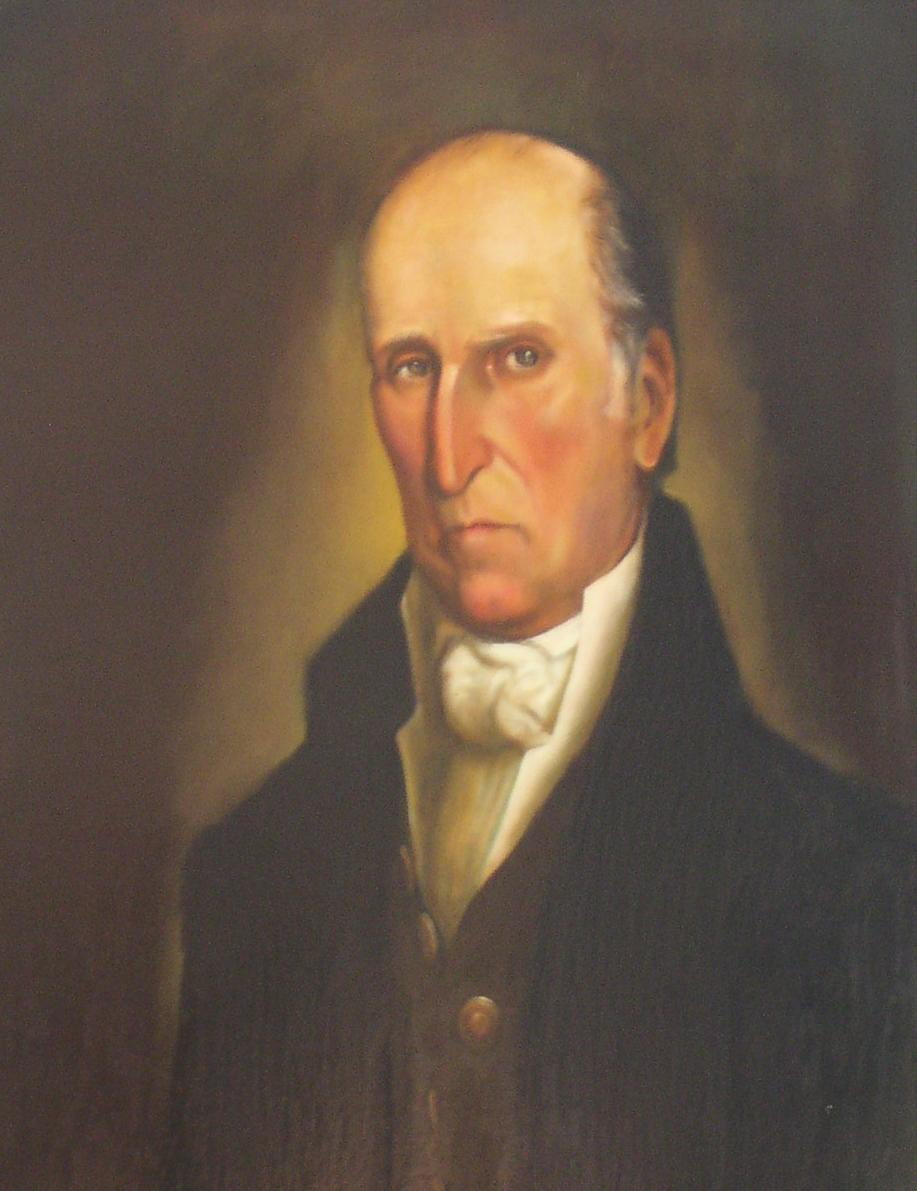
U.S. Representative Andrew Pickens

The preamble begins with,

THOMAS JEFFERSON, President of the United States of America, by James Wilkinson, of the state of Maryland, Brigadier-General in the army of the United States, Benjamin Hawkins, of North Carolina, and Andrew Pickens, of South Carolina, commissioners plenipotentiary of the United States on the one part, and the Mingos, principal men and warriors of the Choctaw nation, representing the said nation in council assembled, on the other part, have entered into the following articles and conditions, viz: ...

— Treaty of Fort Adams, 1801

1. Peace and Friendship
2. Wagon road through Choctaw country
3. Boundary defined
4. Notification of survey
5. Financial compensations
6. When the treaty takes effect

== Signatories ==
James Wilkinson, Benjamin Hawkins, Andrew Pickens, Buckshun Nubby, Mingo Hom Massatubby.

== See also ==
- Natchez District
- List of Choctaw Treaties
- Treaty of Hopewell
- Treaty of Fort Confederation
- Treaty of Hoe Buckintoopa
- Treaty of Mount Dexter
- Treaty of Fort St. Stephens
- Treaty of Doak's Stand
- Treaty of Washington City
- Treaty of Dancing Rabbit Creek
- List of treaties
