= Treaty of Hoe Buckintoopa =

1803 treaty between the United States and Choctaw

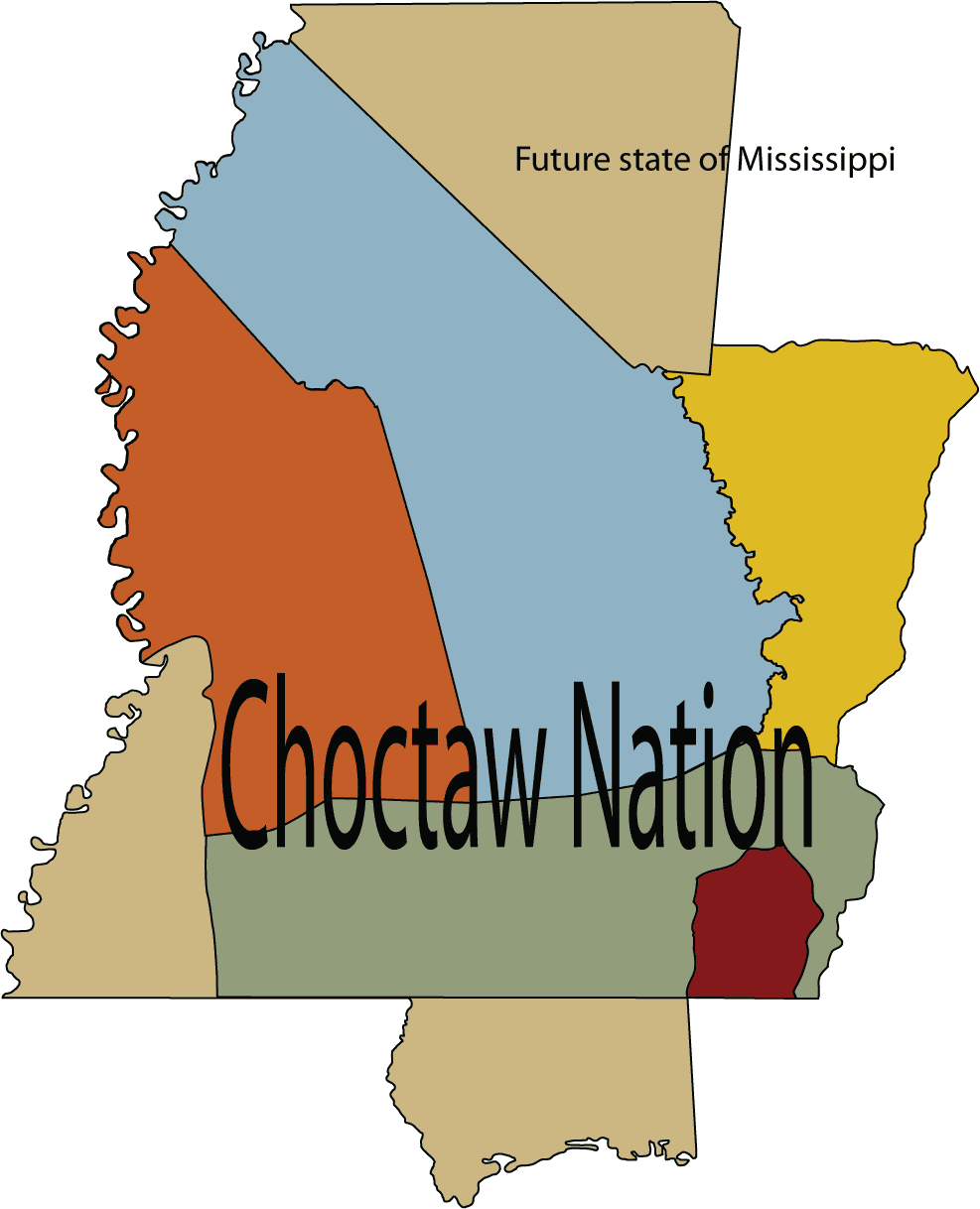
The approximate area to be ceded shaded in Maroon in relation to the future U.S. state of Mississippi.

The Treaty of Hoe Buckintoopa was signed on August 31, 1803, between the Choctaw (an American Indian tribe) and the United States Government. The treaty ceded about 853,760 acres (3,455.0 km^{2}) of Choctaw land.

== Terms ==
The preamble begins with,

To whom these presents shall come, KNOW YE, That the undersigned, commissioners plenipotentiary of the United States of America, of the one part, and of the whole Choctaw nation of the other part, being duly authorised by the President of the United States, and by the chiefs and headmen of the said nation, do hereby establish in conformity to the convention of Fort Confederation, for the line of demarkation recognized in the said convention ...

— Treaty of Hoe Buckintoopa, 1803

1. Receive fifteen pieces of strouds, three rifles, one hundred and fifty blankets, two hundred and fifty pounds.

== Signatories ==
James Wilkinson, Mingo Pooscoos, Alatala Hooma.

== See also ==
- List of Choctaw Treaties
- Treaty of Hopewell
- Treaty of Fort Adams
- Treaty of Fort Confederation
- Treaty of Mount Dexter
- Treaty of Fort St. Stephens
- Treaty of Doak's Stand
- Treaty of Washington City
- Treaty of Dancing Rabbit Creek
- List of treaties
