= Treaty of Dancing Rabbit Creek =

1831 land cession treaty between the U.S. government and the Choctaw tribe

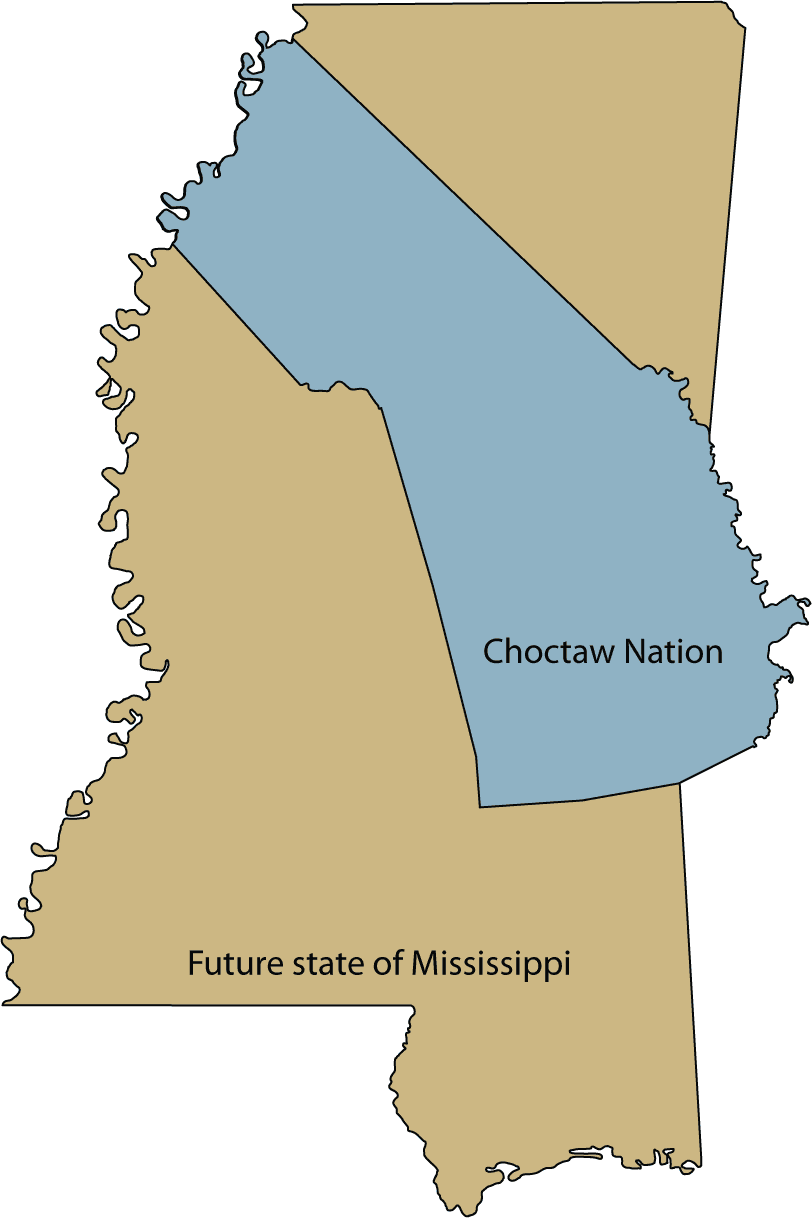
- The approximate area that the treaty defined shaded in blue in relation to the U.S. state of Mississippi (1817)
- Signed: 27 September 1830
- Location: Dancing Rabbit Creek
- Effective: 24 February 1831
- Parties: United States; Choctaw Nation
- Citations: 7 Stat. 333

The Treaty of Dancing Rabbit Creek was a treaty which was signed on September 27, 1830, and proclaimed on February 24, 1831, between the Choctaw American Indian tribe and the United States government. This treaty was the first removal treaty which was carried into effect under the Indian Removal Act. The treaty ceded about 11 million acres (45,000 km^{2}) of the Choctaw Nation primarily in the state of Mississippi, which had been admitted to the Union in 1817, in exchange for about 15 million acres (61,000 km^{2}) in the Indian Territory, in a territory, which became the state of Oklahoma. The principal Choctaw negotiators were Chief Greenwood LeFlore, Mosholatubbee, and Nittucachee; the U.S. negotiators were Colonel John Coffee and Secretary of War John Eaton.

The site of the signing of this treaty is in the southwest corner of Noxubee County; the site was known to the Choctaw as Bok Chukfi Ahilha (creek "bok" rabbit "chukfi" place to dance "a+hilha" or Dancing Rabbit Creek). The Treaty of Dancing Rabbit Creek was the last major land cession treaty which was signed by the Choctaw. With ratification by the U.S. Congress in 1831, the treaty allowed those Choctaw who chose to remain in Mississippi to become the first major non-European ethnic group to gain recognition as U.S. citizens.

== Overview ==
On August 25, 1830, the Choctaw were supposed to meet with President Andrew Jackson in Franklin, Tennessee, but Greenwood Leflore informed the Secretary of War, John H. Eaton, that the chiefs were fiercely opposed to attending. The president was upset but, as the journalist Len Green wrote in 1978, "Although angered by the Choctaw refusal to meet him in Tennessee, Jackson felt from LeFlore's words that he might have a foot in the door and dispatched Secretary of War Eaton and John Coffee to meet with the Choctaws in their nation." Jackson appointed Eaton and General John Coffee as commissioners to represent him to meet the Choctaws where the "rabbits gather to dance."

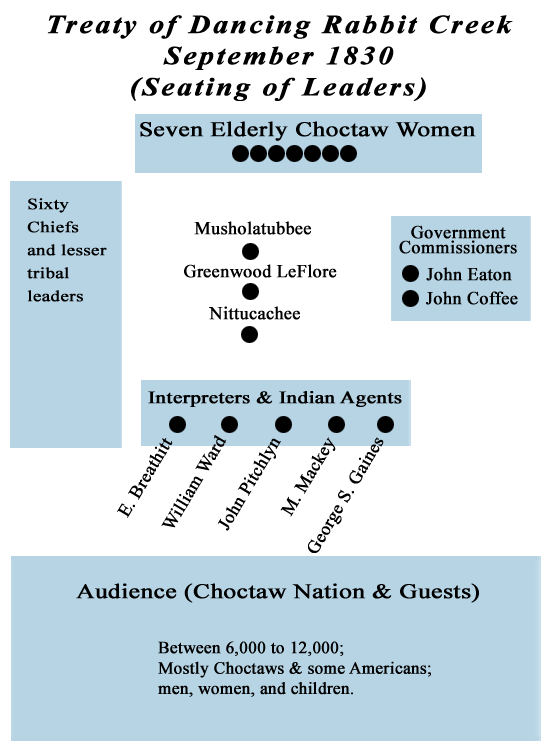
The approximate areas where the Choctaw Nation and the United States leaders were seated.

The commissioners met with the chiefs and headmen on September 15, 1830, at Dancing Rabbit Creek. In a carnival-like atmosphere, the US officials explained the policy of removal through interpreters to an audience of 6,000 men, women, and children. The Choctaws faced migration west of the Mississippi River or submitting to U.S. and state law as citizens. The treaty would sign away the remaining traditional homeland to the United States; however, a provision in the treaty made removal more acceptable.

The Treaty of Dancing Rabbit Creek was one of the largest land transfers ever signed between the United States government and American Indians in time of peace. The Choctaw ceded their remaining traditional homeland to the United States. Article 14 allowed for some Choctaw to remain in the state of Mississippi, if they wanted to become citizens:

ART. XIV. Each Choctaw head of a family being desirous to remain and become a citizen of the States, shall be permitted to do so, by signifying his intention to the Agent within six months from the ratification of this Treaty, and he or she shall thereupon be entitled to a reservation of one section of six hundred and forty acres of land, to be bounded by sectional lines of survey; in like manner shall be entitled to one half that quantity for each unmarried child which is living with him over ten years of age; and a quarter section to such child as may be under 10 years of age, to adjoin the location of the parent. If they reside upon said lands intending to become citizens of the States for five years after the ratification of this Treaty, in that case a grant in fee simple shall issue; said reservation shall include the present improvement of the head of the family, or a portion of it. Persons who claim under this article shall not lose the privilege of a Choctaw citizen, but if they ever remove are not to be entitled to any portion of the Choctaw annuity.

The Choctaw were the first of the "Five Civilized Tribes" to be removed from the southeastern United States, as the federal and state governments desired Indian lands to accommodate a growing agrarian American society. Nearly 15,000 Choctaws together with 1,000 slaves made the move to what would be called Indian Territory and then later Oklahoma. The population transfer occurred in three migrations during the 1831–1833 period including the devastating winter blizzard of 1830–1831 and the cholera epidemic of 1832. About 2,500 died along the Trail of Tears. Approximately 5,000–6,000 Choctaws remained in Mississippi in 1831 after the initial removal efforts. For the next ten years those that remained were objects of increasing legal conflict, harassment, and intimidation. The Choctaw that migrated, like the Creek, Cherokee, Chickasaw, and Seminole who followed them, attempted to resurrect their traditional lifestyle and government in their new homeland.

The Choctaw at this crucial time became two distinct groups: the Nation in Oklahoma and the Tribe in Mississippi. The nation retained its autonomy to regulate itself, but the tribe left in Mississippi became citizens of Mississippi and the United States, who were subject to state and U.S. laws. Under article XIV, the Mississippi Choctaws became one of the first major non-European ethnic group to gain U.S. citizenship. The Choctaw sought to elect a representative to the U.S. House of Representatives.

== Terms ==
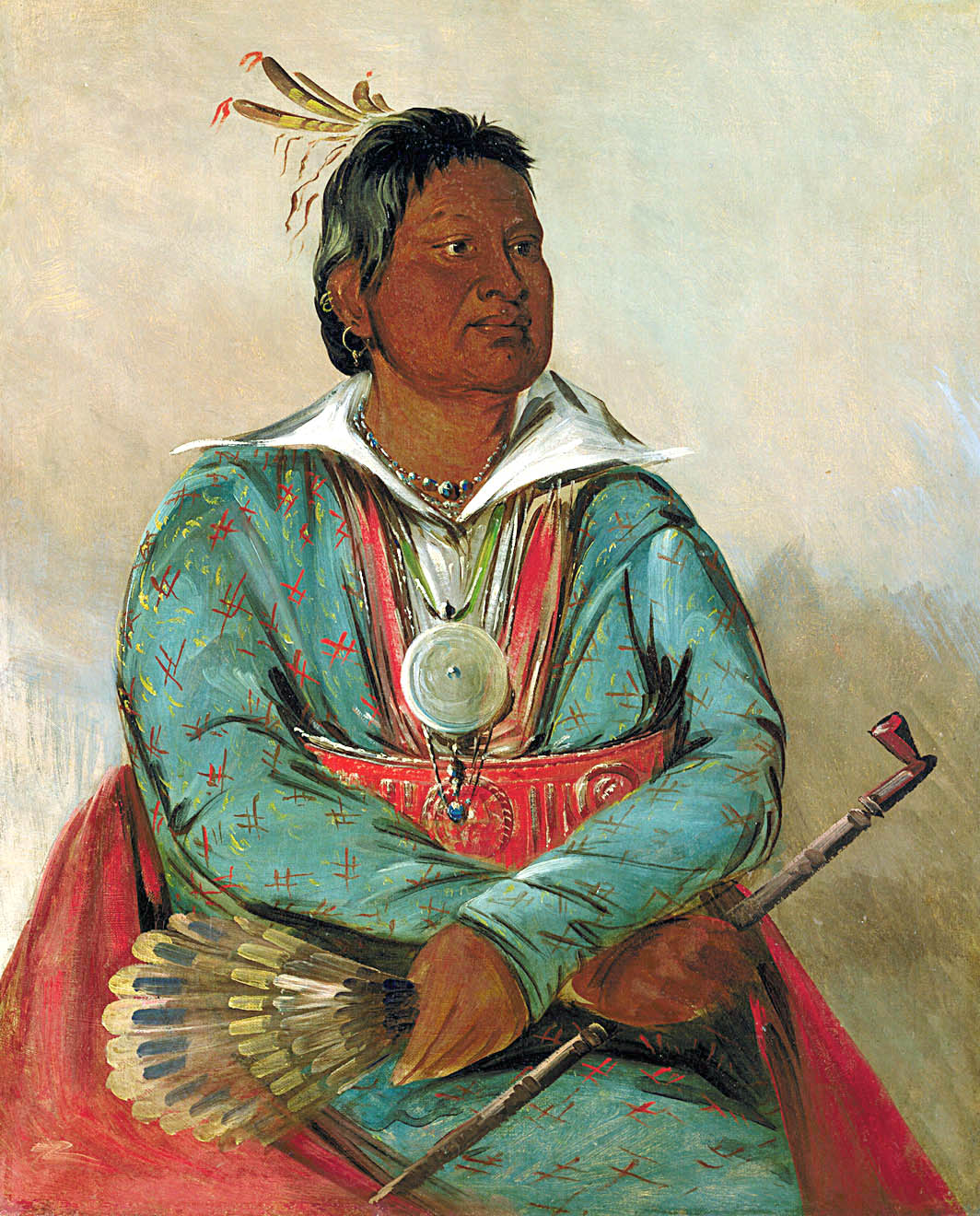
Mosholatubbee sought to be elected to the Congress of the United States. 1834, Smithsonian American Art Museum.

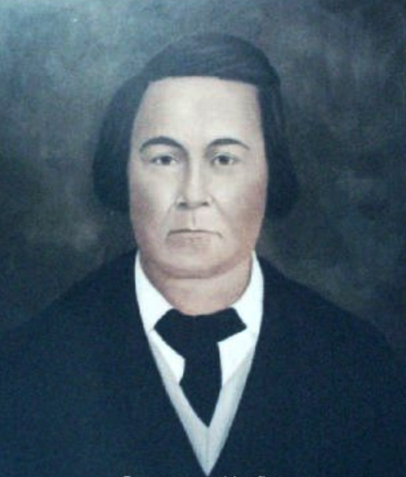
Greenwood LeFlore, the chief who led treaty negotiations. The council would later depose him in a coup.

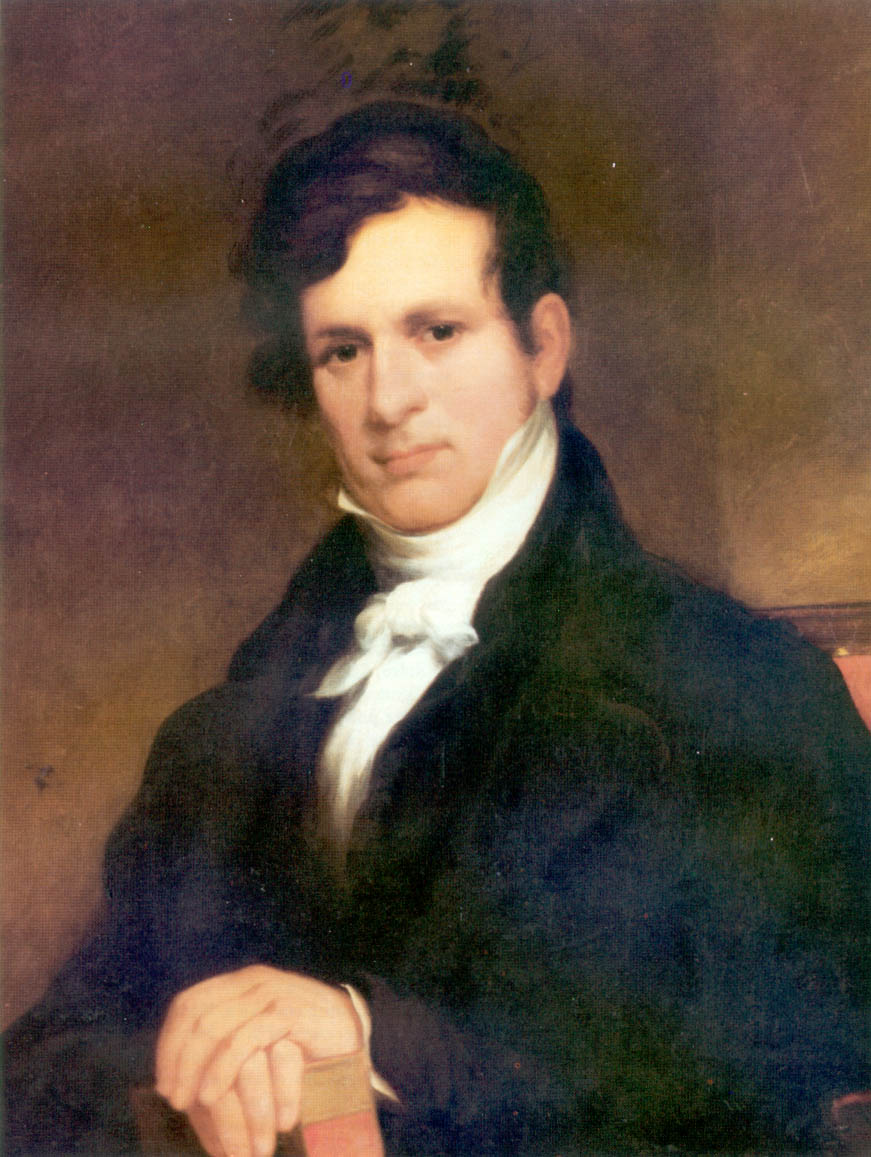
John Eaton was a close personal friend of Andrew Jackson. He was Secretary of War for the Jackson administration. Painted 1873 by Robert Weir.

The preamble begins with,

A treaty of perpetual, friendship, cession and limits, entered into by John H. Eaton and John Coffee, for and in behalf of the Government of the United States, and the Mingoes, Chiefs, Captains and Warriors of the Choctaw Nation, begun and held at Dancing Rabbit Creek, on the fifteenth of September, in the year eighteen hundred and thirty ...

— Treaty of Dancing Rabbit Creek, 1830

The following terms of the treaty were:

1. Perpetual peace and friendship.
2. Lands (in what is now Oklahoma) west of the Mississippi River to be conveyed to the Choctaw Nation.
3. Lands east of the Mississippi River to be ceded and removal to begin in 1831 and end in 1833.
4. Autonomy of the Choctaw Nation (in Oklahoma) and descendants to be secured from laws of U.S. states and territories forever.
5. The Choctaw Nation will become a protectorate of the United States.
6. Choctaw or party of Choctaws part of violent acts against the U.S. citizens or property will be delivered to the U.S. authorities.
7. Offenses against Choctaws and their property by U.S. citizens and other tribes will be examined and every possible degree of justice applied.
8. No harboring of U.S. fugitives with all expenses to capture him or her paid by the U.S.
9. Persons ordered from Choctaw Nation.
10. Traders require a written permit.
11. Navigable streams will be free for Choctaws, U.S. post-offices will be established in the Choctaw Nation, and U.S. military posts and roads may be created.
12. Intruders will be removed from the Choctaw Nation. U.S. citizens stealing Choctaw property shall be returned and offender punished. Choctaw offending U.S. laws shall be given a fair and impartial trial.
13. U.S. agent appointed to the Choctaws every four years.
14. Choctaws may become U.S. citizens and are entitled to 640 acres (2.6 km^{2}) of land (in Mississippi) with additional land for children.
15. Lands granted to the Choctaw chiefs (Greenwood LeFlore, Musholatubbee, and Nittucachee) with annuities granted to each of them.
16. Transportation in wagons and steamboats will be provided at the costs of the U.S. Ample food will be provided during the removal and 12 months after reaching the new homes. Reimbursements will be provided for cattle left in Mississippi Territory.
17. Annuities to Choctaws to continue from other treaties. Additional payments after removal.
18. Choctaw Country to be surveyed.
19. Lands granted to I. Garland, Colonel Robert Cole, Tuppanahomer, John Pytchlynn, Charles Juzan, Johokebetubbe, Eaychahobia, and Ofehoma.
20. Improve the Choctaw condition with Education. Provide tools, weapons, and steel.
21. Choctaw Warriors who marched and fought in the army of U.S. General Wayne during the American Revolution and Northwest Indian War will receive an annuity.
22. Choctaw delegate on the floor of the U.S. House of Representatives.

=== Unratified section ===
The following paragraph of the treaty was not ratified:

"WHEREAS the General Assembly of the State of Mississippi has extended the laws of said State to persons and property within the chartered limits of the same, and the President of the United States has said that he cannot protect the Choctaw people from the operation of these laws; Now therefore that the Choctaw may live under their own laws in peace with the United States and the State of Mississippi they have determined to sell their lands east of the Mississippi and have accordingly agreed to the following articles of treaty".

== Signatories ==
The main signatories included John Eaton, John Coffee, Greenwood Leflore, Musholatubbee, and Nittucachee. Nearly 200 other signatures are on the treaty.

== Aftermath ==
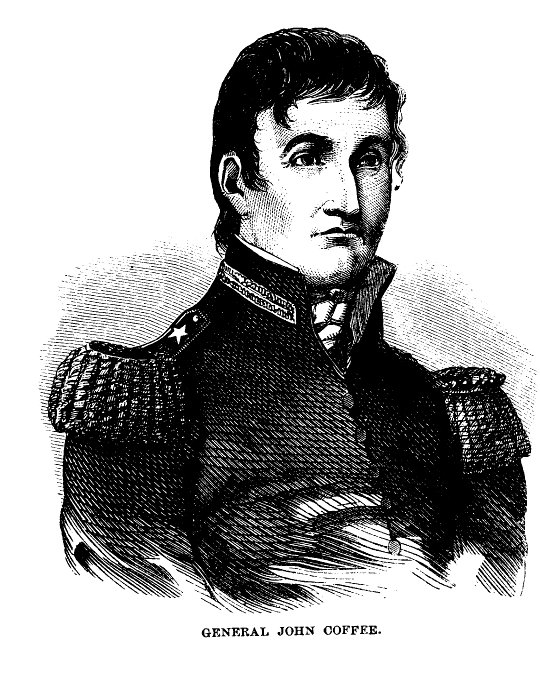
John R. Coffee

After ceding nearly 11,000,000 acres (45,000 km^{2}), the Choctaw emigrated in three stages: the first in the fall of 1831, the second in 1832 and the last in 1833. The Treaty of Dancing Rabbit Creek was ratified by the U.S. Senate on February 25, 1831, and the President was anxious to make it a model of removal. The chief George W. Harkins wrote a letter to the American people before the removals began:

It is with considerable diffidence that I attempt to address the American people, knowing and feeling sensibly my incompetency; and believing that your highly and well improved minds would not be well entertained by the address of a Choctaw. But having determined to emigrate west of the Mississippi river this fall, I have thought proper in bidding you farewell to make a few remarks expressive of my views, and the feelings that actuate me on the subject of our removal.... We as Choctaws rather chose to suffer and be free, than live under the degrading influence of laws, which our voice could not be heard in their formation.... Much as the state of Mississippi has wronged us, I cannot find in my heart any other sentiment than an ardent wish for her prosperity and happiness.

— -George W. Harkins, George W. Harkins to the American People

Around 15,000 Choctaws left the old Choctaw Nation for the Indian Territory, much of the state of Oklahoma today. The name Oklahoma was created in 1886 by Principal Chief Allen Wright (Choctaw, 1826–1885). The Choctaw Nation of Oklahoma states that in the Choctaw language Okla means "people" and humma means "red."

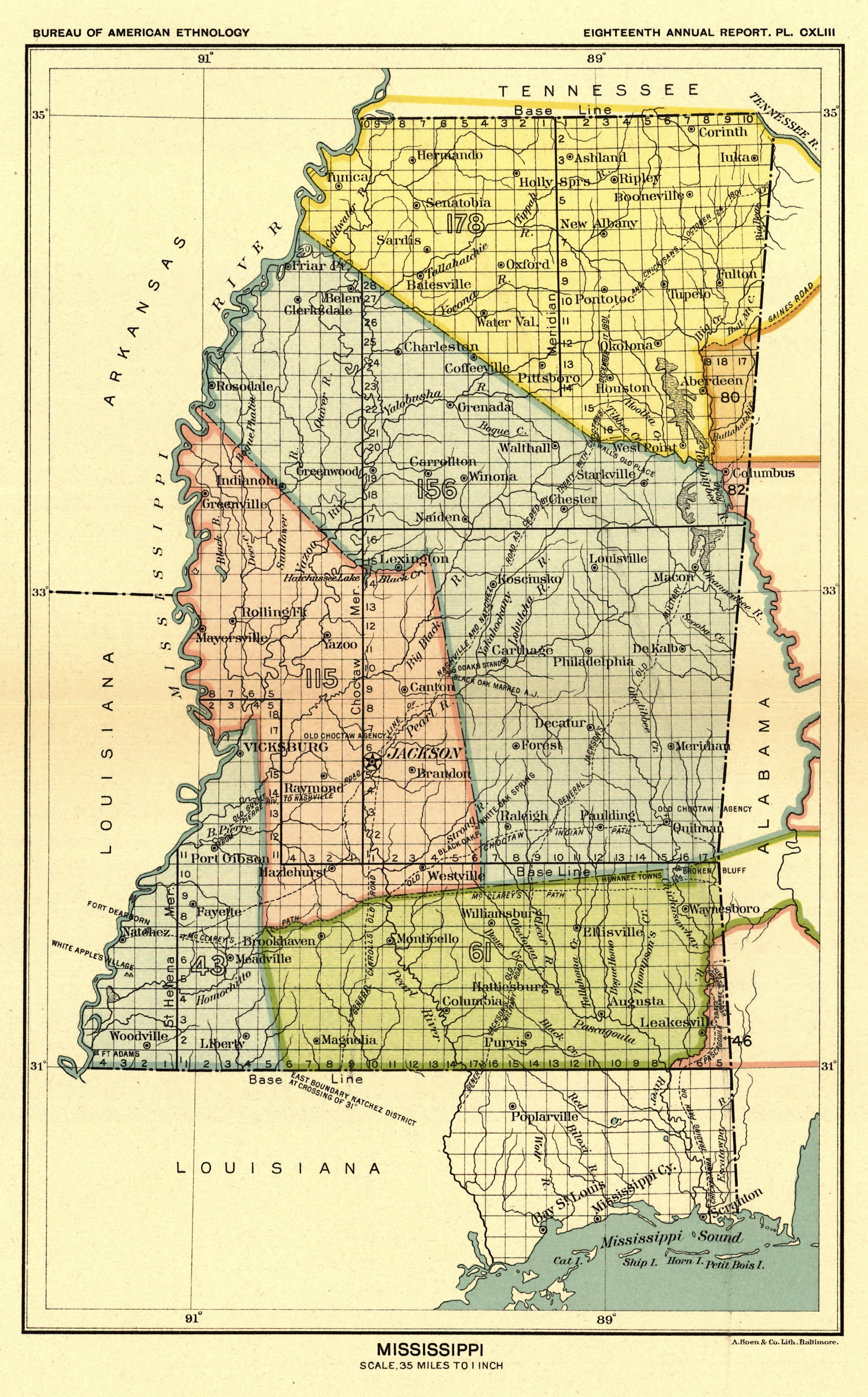
Mississippi map from Indian land cessions in the United States (1898) by Charles C. Royce. Area labeled 156 are the Mississippi cessions from the treaty

Late 20th-century estimates are that between 5,000 and 6,000 Choctaws remained in Mississippi in 1831 after the first removal. For the next ten years they were objects of increasing legal conflict, harassment, and intimidation. The Choctaw described their situation in 1849:

we have had our habitations torn down and burned, our fences destroyed, cattle turned into our fields and we ourselves have been scourged, manacled, fettered and otherwise personally abused, until by such treatment some of our best men have died.

Joseph B. Cobb, a settler who moved to Mississippi from Georgia, described the Choctaw as having

no nobility or virtue at all, and in some respect he found blacks, especially native Africans, more interesting and admirable, the red man's superior in every way. The Choctaw and Chickasaw, the tribes he knew best, were beneath contempt, that is, even worse than black slaves.

The removals continued well into the early 20th century. In 1903, three hundred Mississippi Choctaws were persuaded to move to the Nation in Oklahoma. The Choctaw did not gain a delegate on the floor of the U.S. House of Representative. Greenwood LeFlore, a Choctaw leader, stayed in Mississippi, where he was elected to the Mississippi House of Representatives and Senate.

The Choctaw Nation continued to thrive until Oklahoma was created as a state. Their government was dismantled under the Curtis Act, along with those of other Native American nations in the former Indian Territory, to permit the admission of Oklahoma as a state. Their communal lands were divided and allotted to individual households under the Dawes Act to increase assimilation as American-style farmers. The US declared communal land remaining after allotment to be surplus and sold it to American settlers. In the 20th century, the Choctaw reorganized and were recognized by the government as the Choctaw Nation.

The descendants of the Choctaw who stayed in Mississippi reorganized themselves as the Mississippi Band of Choctaw Indians in 1945 and gained federal recognition.

== See also ==
- List of Choctaw Treaties
- Treaty of Hopewell
- Treaty of Fort Adams
- Treaty of Fort Confederation
- Treaty of Hoe Buckintoopa
- Treaty of Mount Dexter
- Treaty of Fort St. Stephens
- Treaty of Doak's Stand
- Treaty of Washington City
- List of treaties
