= Treaty of Doak's Stand =

1821 treaty between the United States and Choctaw

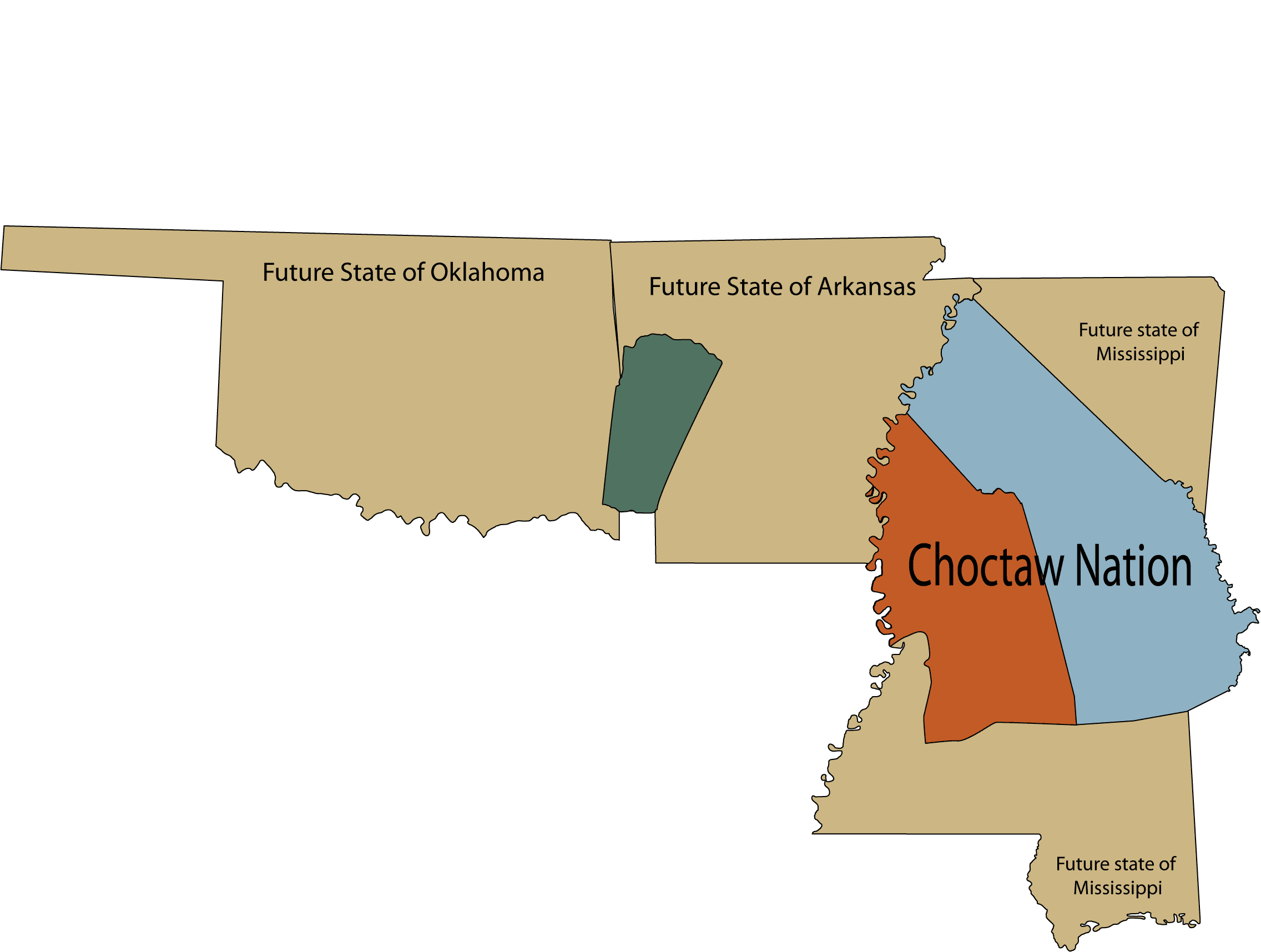
The approximate ceded areas shaded in orange and green in relation to Mississippi and the future U.S. states of Arkansas and Oklahoma.

The Treaty of Doak's Stand (7 Stat. 210, also known as Treaty with the Choctaw) was signed on October 18, 1820 (proclaimed and legally binding on January 8, 1821) between the United States and the Choctaw Indian tribe. The Treaty of Doak's Stand was the seventh of nine major treaties that were ratified from the period from 1786 through 1866 between the United States government and the Choctaw nation during a time of rapid westward expansion of white settlers. Based on the terms of the accord, the Choctaw were forced to give up approximately 5 million acres or roughly one-third of their remaining Choctaw homeland in the east in exchange for 13 million westward acres in the Canadian Kiamichi, Arkansas, and Red River watersheds. The Choctaw reluctantly signed the agreement in an effort to maintain peace as they were threatened by the US commissioners that if they did not agree to move west, they would perish.

In October 1820, US General and future US President Andrew Jackson and retired US General Thomas Hinds were sent by President James Monroe as commissioners who represented the United States to negotiate and write a treaty to surrender a large portion of Choctaw country in Mississippi. They met with tribal representatives at Doak's Stand on the Natchez Trace. The treaty's name is based on the site of the meeting, which took place at a Mississippi tavern known as Doak's Stand. US commissioners met with the chiefs Pushmataha, Mushulatubbee, and Apuckshunubbee, who represented the three major regional divisions of the Choctaw. Chiefs of the towns and other prominent men accompanied them, such as Colonel Silas Dinsmore.

Dinsmore was a former US Indian agent to the Choctaw; his passport ruling in 1812 had stirred a brief controversy with General Andrew Jackson. Dinsmore was at the negotiations to settle a land claim; he believed the policy of the American government toward the Indian tribes was too harsh. His attitude suggested a potential confrontation, but Jackson paid no attention to him.

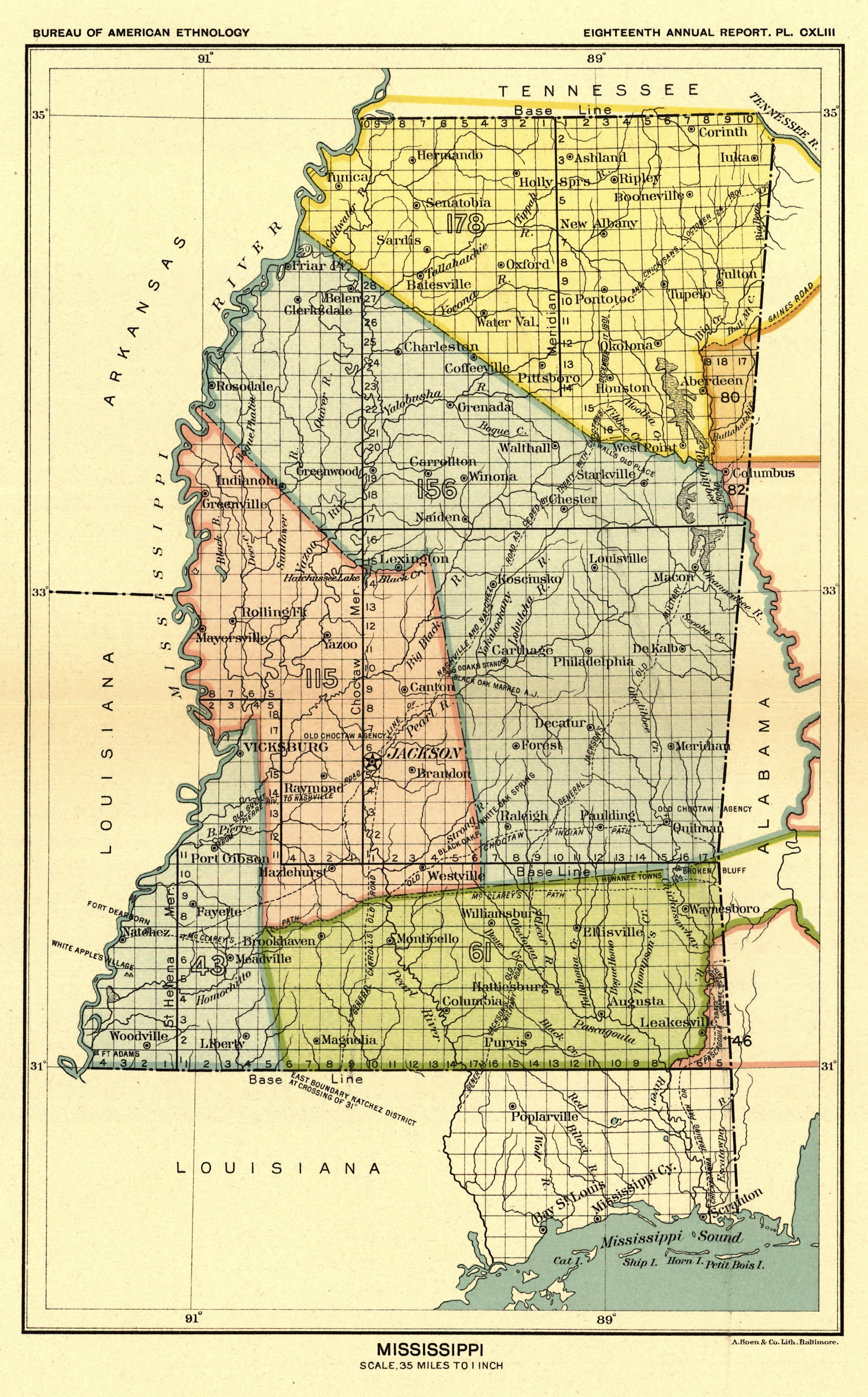
Map from Indian land cessions in the United States by Charles C. Royce showing location of Doaks' Stand

The convention began on October 10 with a talk by Jackson (whom the Choctaw nicknamed Sharp Knife), to more than 500 Choctaw. After Jackson presented his proposal to exchange Choctaw land for territory in present-day Arkansas, Pushmataha accused the general of deceiving them about the quality of land west of the Mississippi. Pushmataha said, "I know the country well ... The grass is everywhere very short ... There are but few beavers and the honey and fruit are rare things." Jackson finally resorted to threats to pressure the Choctaw to sign a treaty. He shouted, "Many of your nation are already beyond the Mississippi, and others are every year removing .... If you refuse ... the nation will be destroyed." On October 18, 1820, the chiefs signed the treaty.

Not only did the Choctaw nation object to the treaty, but also, the white settlers already living in Arkansas were concerned. The white Arkansan settlers believed that their life, liberty, and happiness had been threatened by the US Government because the Choctaw would also settle on the same land. The white settlers also thought the Choctaw received a windfall from the treaty. “Indignant Arkansans felt as though their future had been annihilated by their government in favor of the Choctaws, who now controlled land on both sides of the Mississippi River.” The Mississippi Gazette, in 1821, referred to the treaty as a “death blow” to Arkansas Territory. From the moment the Treaty was ratified, both white settlers in Arkansas and the Choctaw argued for changes and amendments. The Treaty of Doak's Stand would later influence the 1830 Treaty of Dancing Rabbit, which forced the ceding of additional Choctaw lands as part of the Indian Removal Act signed by then-President Andrew Jackson.

Article IV prepared the Choctaw to become citizens of the United States when he or she became acculturated. This article would later influence Article XIV in the 1830 Treaty of Dancing Rabbit Creek.

ART. IV. The boundaries hereby established between the Choctaw Indians and the United States, on this side of the Mississippi river, shall remain without alteration until the period at which said nation shall become so civilized and enlightened as to be made citizens of the United States and Congress shall lay off a limited parcel of land for the benefit of each family or individual in the nation. ...

— Treaty of Doak's Stand, 1820

== Terms ==
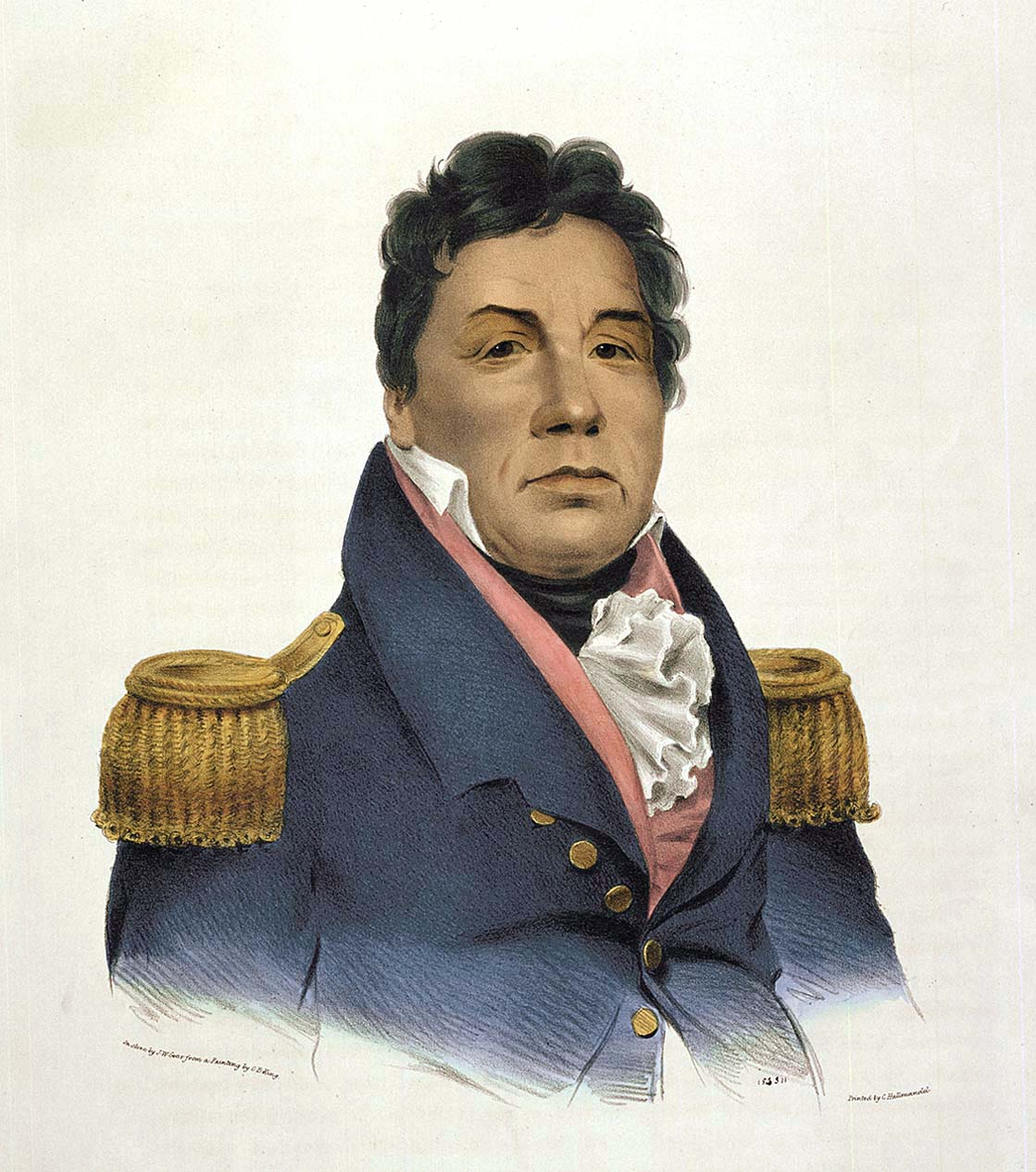
Pushmataha in 1824, from History of the Indian Tribes of North America.

The preamble begins,

WHEREAS it is an important object with the President of the United States, to promote the civilization of the Choctaw Indians, by the establishment of schools amongst them; and to perpetuate them as a nation, by exchanging, for a small part of their land here, a country beyond the Mississippi River, where all, who live by hunting and will not work, may be collected and settled together. And whereas it is desirable to the state of Mississippi, to obtain a small part of the land belonging to said nation; for the mutual accommodation of the parties, and for securing the happiness and protection of the whole Choctaw nation, as well as preserving that harmony and friendship which so happily subsists between them and the United States, James Monroe, President of the United States of America, by Andrew Jackson, of the State of Tennessee, Major General in the Army of the United States, and General Thomas Hinds, of the State of Mississippi, Commissioners Plenipotentiary of the United States, on the one part, and the Mingoes, Head Men, and Warriors, of the Choctaw nation, in full Council assembled, on the other part,: have freely and voluntarily entered into the following articles, viz ...

— Treaty of Doak's Stand, 1820

The terms of the treaty were:

1. Choctaw land (in Mississippi) ceded to the U.S.
2. Boundary of western land (in Arkansas) ceded to the Choctaw nation.
3. Marking of boundaries by Choctaw-appointed guide.
4. Boundaries may not change until the Choctaw are civilized and enlightened so as to become citizens of the United States.
5. Corn, Blankets, kettles, rifle guns, bullet moulds & nippers, and ammunition to be given to Choctaws, who moved from ceded territory to lands west of the Mississippi River (Oklahoma), for one year.
6. U.S. agent appointed, goods and supplies to be sent, and a blacksmith will be appointed to Choctaws in ceded lands. Property of removed Choctaws to be sent to them.
7. Selling of Choctaw lands to support Choctaw schools on both sides of the Mississippi River.
8. Annuity of $6000 US annually for 16 years for discontented Choctaws. 9. Agents may confiscate Whiskey, except at public stands or introduced by the agent or the Chiefs of the district.

== Choctaw Reservation ==
The Reservation granted to the Choctaw in Arkansas was defined and land between the Red River in the South, and the Canadian and Arkansas Rivers in the North. In the West, the boundary ran from the source of the Canadian River. This was, at the time, in Mexico. The land actually owned by the United States began where the Canadian and Red Rivers crossed the 100th Meridian West, what is today the Oklahoma-Texas border.

Along the Red River, the border ran East until it reached the point where the Little River enters the Red River, what is today Fulton, Arkansas. The border then ran Northeast to the easternmost boundary of the Cherokee Reservation, established in 1817. That Reservation begain where Point Remove Creek entered the Arkansas River, what is today Morrilton, Arkansas. From there, it ran East along the Arkansas River, through Fort Smith, to where the Canadian River enters the Arkansas. From there it followed the Canadian River to its source, or realistically the 100th Meridian.

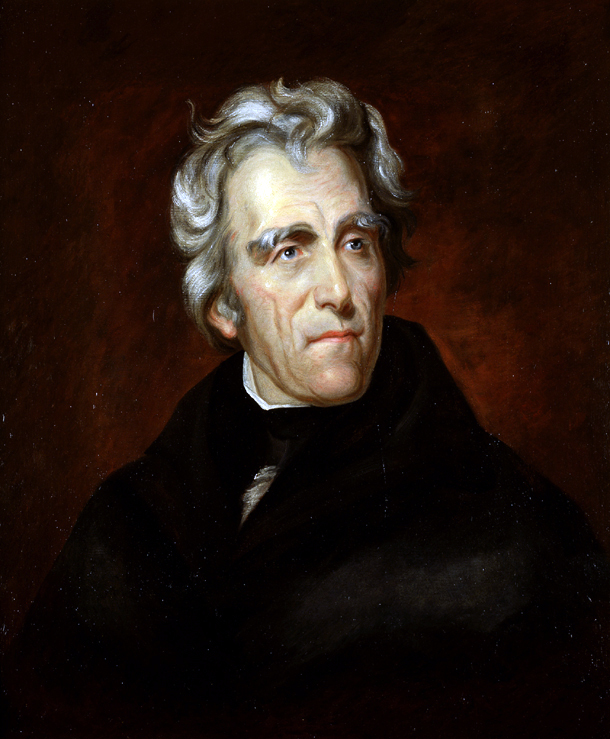
Andrew Jackson in 1824.

== Signatories ==
Andrew Jackson, Thomas Hinds, Apukshunnubbee, Pooshawattaha, and Mushulatubbee.

== Colonization ==
The land ceded under the Treaty of Doak's Stand became known as the New Purchase, and was eventually subdivided into Hinds County, Copiah County, Yazoo County, Simpson County, Washington County, Madison County, and Rankin County, Mississippi.

== See also ==
- List of Choctaw Treaties
- Treaty of Hopewell
- Treaty of Fort Adams
- Treaty of Fort Confederation
- Treaty of Hoe Buckintoopa
- Treaty of Mount Dexter
- Treaty of Fort St. Stephens
- Treaty of Washington City
- Treaty of Dancing Rabbit Creek
- List of treaties
