= Treaty of Fort St. Stephens =

1816 treaty between the United States and Choctaw

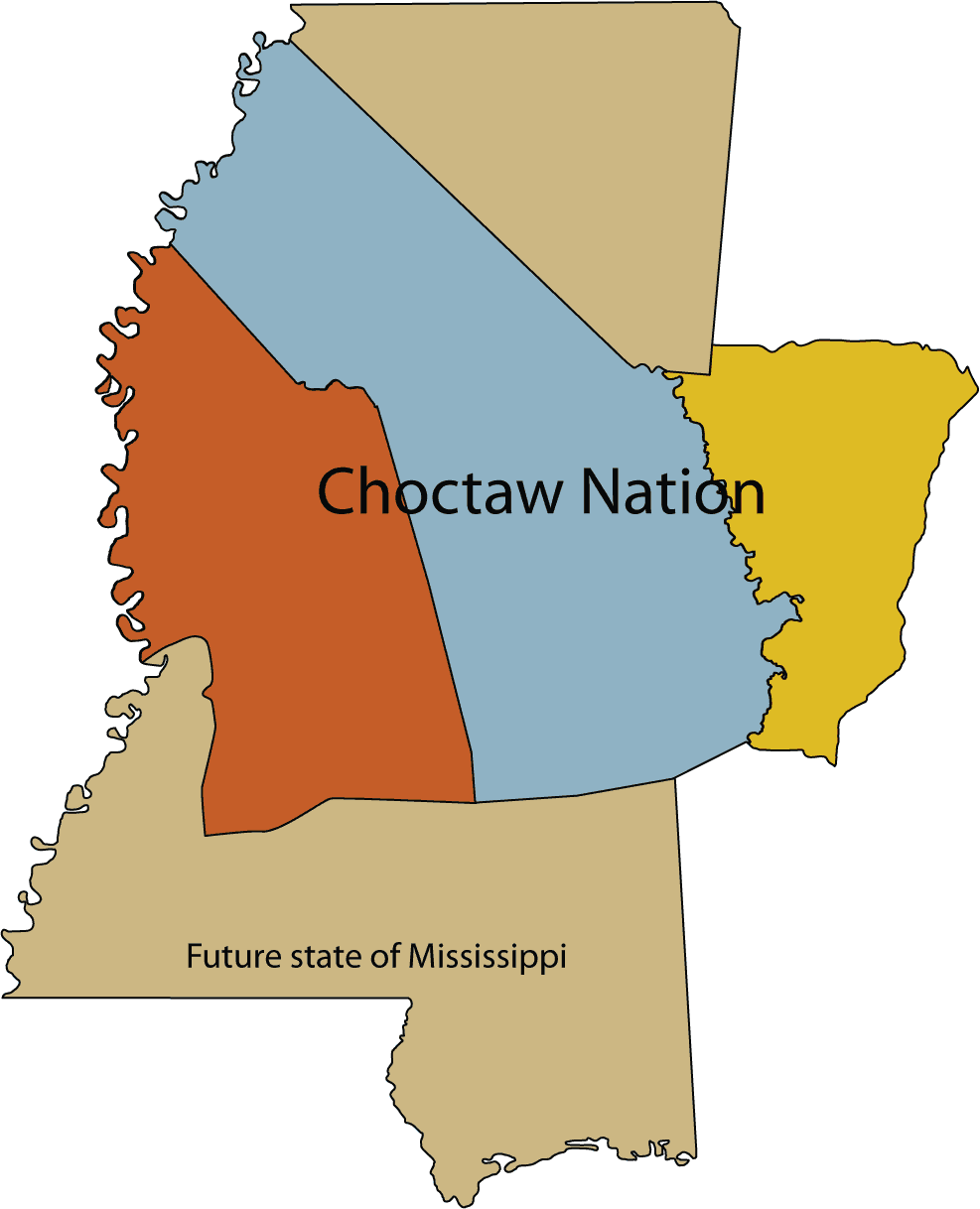
The approximate area to be ceded shaded in yellow in relation to the future U.S. state of Mississippi.

The Treaty of Fort St. Stephens or Treaty of Choctaw Trading House was signed between the United States and the Choctaws at Fort St. Stephens. The treaty was signed at the Choctaw trading house on October 24, 1816. It ceded 10,000 acres (40 km^{2}) of Choctaw land east of the Tombigbee River.

The Choctaw had fought with Andrew Jackson during the Creek War (1813–1814) and at the Battle of New Orleans (1815) but "despite their efforts in support of American foreign policy, the U.S. government insisted on additional land cessions in the 1816 Treaty of Fort St. Stephens, which transferred millions of acres of Choctaw land in Alabama, including present-day Tuscaloosa, to the United States". According to historian and biographer Robert V. Remini, "Through his influence with and instructions to John Coffee, Andrew Jackson dominated the proceedings...the Indians ceded land east of the Tombigbee River, in return for which the United States agreed to an annual payment of US$16,000 (equivalent to $303,529 in 2025) for twenty years and US$10,000 (equivalent to $189,706 in 2025) in merchandise on signing the treaty".

== Terms ==
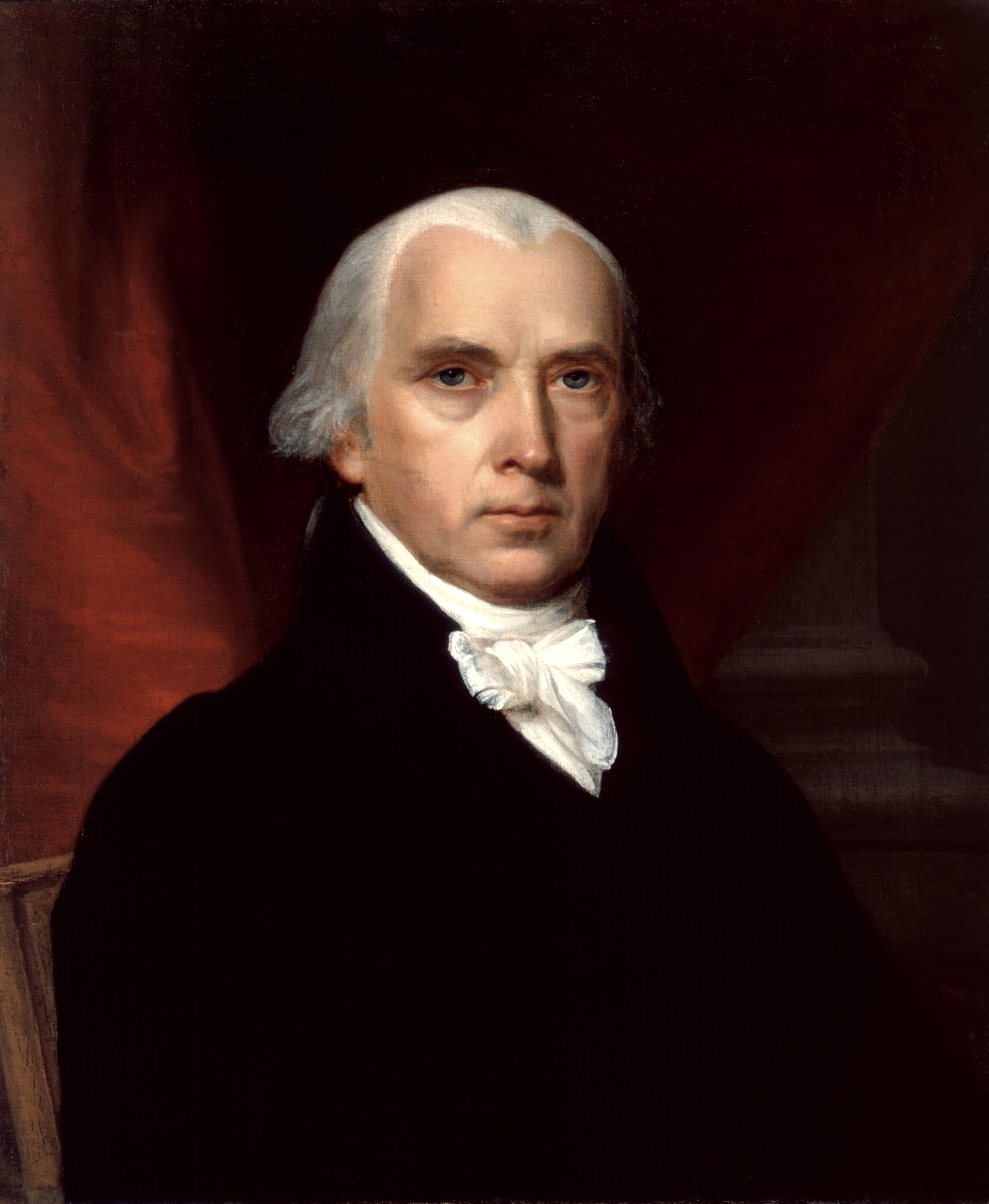
James Madison

The preamble begins with,

James Madison, president of the United States of America, by general John Coffee, John Rhea, and John M'Kee, esquires, commissioners on the part of the United States, duly authorized for that purpose, on the one part, and the mingoes, leaders, captains, and warriors, of the Choctaw nation, in general council assembled, in behalf of themselves and the whole nation, on the other part, have entered into the following articles, which, when ratified by the president of the United States, with the advice and consent of the senate, shall be obligatory on both parties ...

— Treaty of Fort St. Stephens, 1816

1. Lands to be ceded.
2. Pay the Choctaw $6000 US dollars annually for 20 years and $10000 worth of merchandise.

== Signatories ==
John Coffee, John Rhea, John McKee, Mushoolatubbee, Pooshamallaha, Pukshunnubbu, General Terror, Choctaw Eestannokee, General Humming Bird, Talking warrior, David Folsom, Bob Cole, Oofuppa, Hoopoieeskitteenee, Hoopoieemiko, and Hoopoieethoma.

Witness: Tho. H. Williams, secretary to the commission; John Pitchlynn, interpreter; Turner Broshear [Turner Brashears], interpreter; M. Mackey, interpreter; Silas Dinsmoor; and R. Chamberlin.

== See also ==
- List of Choctaw Treaties
- Treaty of Hopewell
- Treaty of Fort Adams
- Treaty of Fort Confederation
- Treaty of Hoe Buckintoopa
- Treaty of Mount Dexter
- Treaty of Doak's Stand
- Treaty of Washington City
- Treaty of Dancing Rabbit Creek
- List of treaties
