= Treaty of Washington City =

1825 treaty between the United States and Choctaw

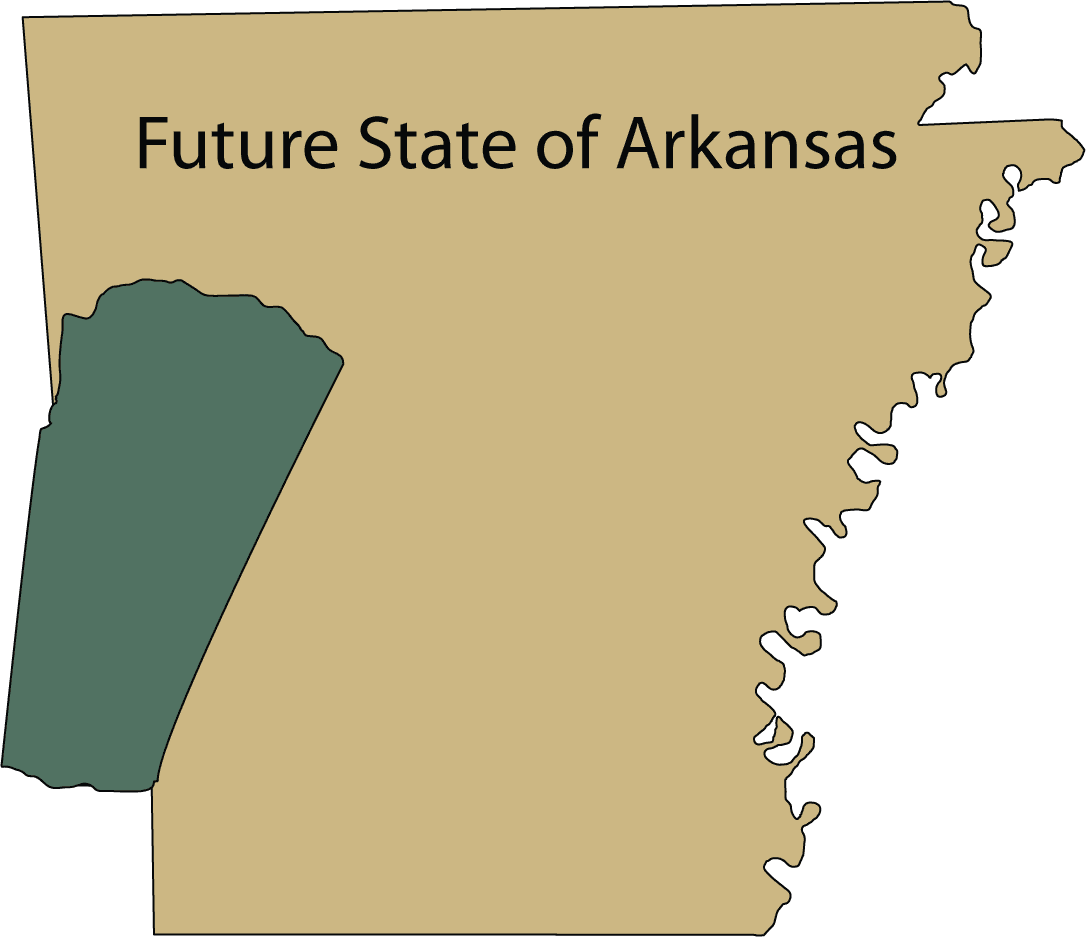
The approximate area ceded shaded in green in relation to the future U.S. state of Arkansas.

The Treaty of Washington City was a treaty signed on January 20, 1825 (proclaimed on February 19, 1825) between the Choctaw (an American Indian tribe) and the United States Government.

== Overview ==
Apuckshunubbee, Pushmataha, and Mosholatubbee, the principal leaders of the Choctaws, went to Washington City (the 19th century name for Washington, D.C.) to discuss encroaching settlement and to seek the expulsion of settlers or financial compensation. The group also included Talking Warrior, Red Fort, Nittahkachee, Col. Robert Cole and David Folsom, both half-breed Indians, Captain Daniel McCurtain, and Major John Pitchlynn, the U.S. Interpreter.

The proposed route to Washington was to travel the Natchez Trace to Nashville, Tennessee, then to Lexington, Kentucky, onward to Maysville, Kentucky, across the Ohio River northward to Chillicothe, Ohio, (former principal town of the Shawnee), then finally east over the "National Highway" to Washington City.

== Meetings while in Washington City ==
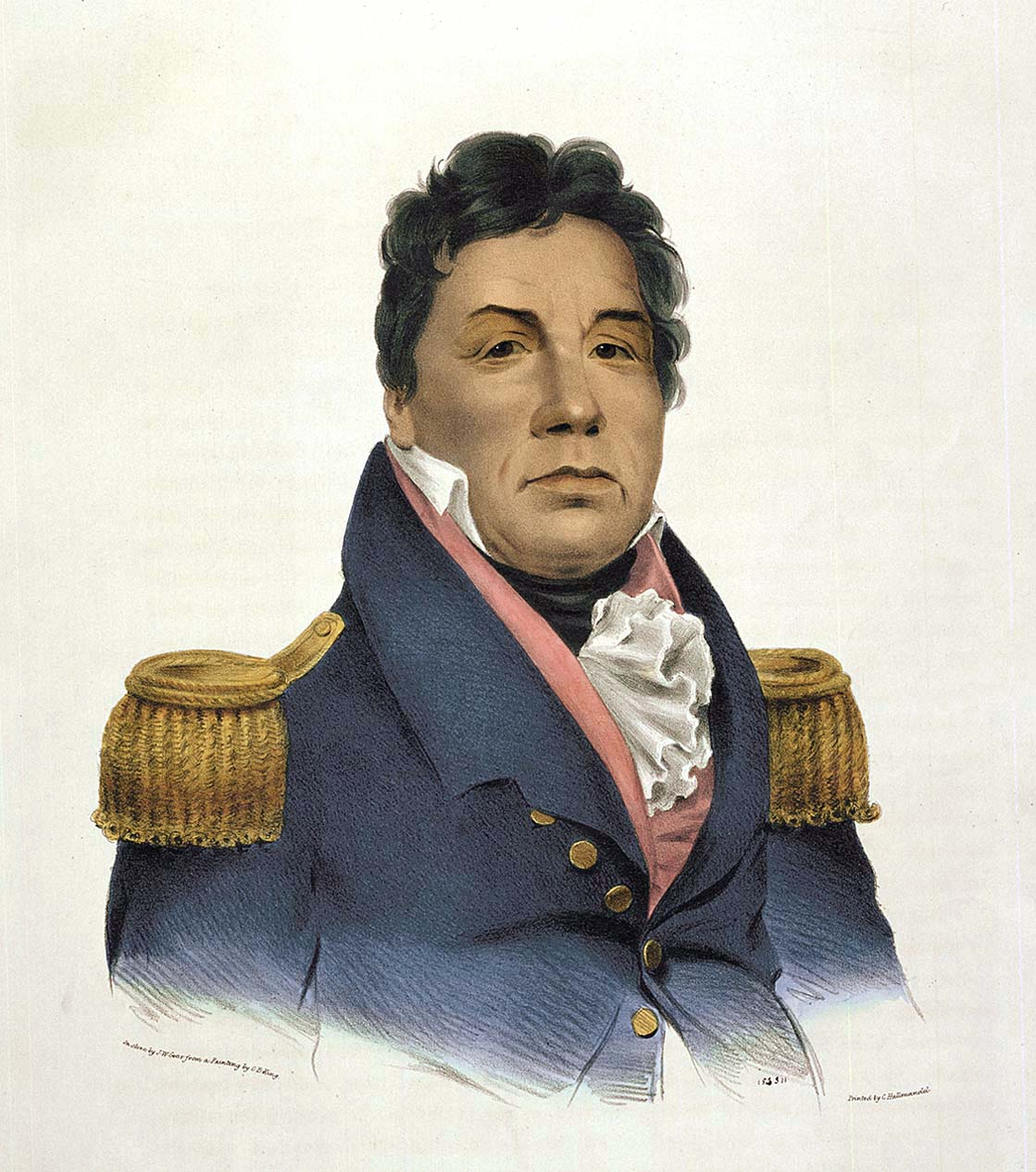
Pushmataha in 1824 a facsimile of a painting by Charles Bird King published in History of the Indian Tribes of North America.

Pushmataha met with President James Monroe and gave a speech to Secretary of War John C. Calhoun, reminding him of the longstanding alliances between the United States and the Choctaws. He said, "[I] can say and tell the truth that no Choctaw ever drew his bow against the United States ... My nation has given of their country until it is very small. We are in trouble."."

While in Washington, Pushmataha sat for a portrait by Charles Bird King in his Army uniform; it hung in the Smithsonian Institution until 1865.

Pushmataha also met with the Marquis de Lafayette, who was visiting Washington City. Pushmataha said, "Nearly fifty snows have melted since you drew your sword with Washington and fought the enemies of the United States ... Our hearts have longed to see you."

== Terms ==
The preamble begins with,

Articles of a convention made between John C. Calhoun, Secretary of War, being specially authorized therefor by the President of the United States, and the undersigned Chiefs and Head Men of the Choctaw Nation of Indians, duly authorized and empowered by said Nation, at the City of Washington, on the twentieth day of January, in the year of our lord one thousand eight hundred and twenty-five ...

— Treaty of Washington City, 1825

The treaty had the following abbreviated terms,

1. Lands ceded to the United States.
2. $6,000 to be paid to Choctaws annually, forever.
3. $6,000 to be paid them annually for 16 years.
4. Provision for Choctaws who may desire to remain.
5. A certain debt due by Choctaws relinquished.
6. Payment for services rendered in the Pensacola campaign.
7. Fourth article of the aforesaid treaty to be modified. The Congress of the United States shall not exercise the power of apportioning the lands ... and of bringing them under the laws of the United States, but with the consent of the Choctaw Nation.
8. Payment to satisfy claims due by United States.
9. An agent and blacksmith for Choctaws west of the Mississippi.
10. Robert Cole to receive a medal.
11. Friendship perpetuated.
12. When to take effect.

== Signatories ==
J. C. Calhoun, Mooshulatubbee, Robert Cole, Daniel McCurtain, Talking Warrior, Red Fort, Nittuckachee, David Folsom, J. L. McDonald, Thos. L. McKenney, Hezekiah Miller, and John Pitchlynn ( United States interpreter).

== Aftermath ==
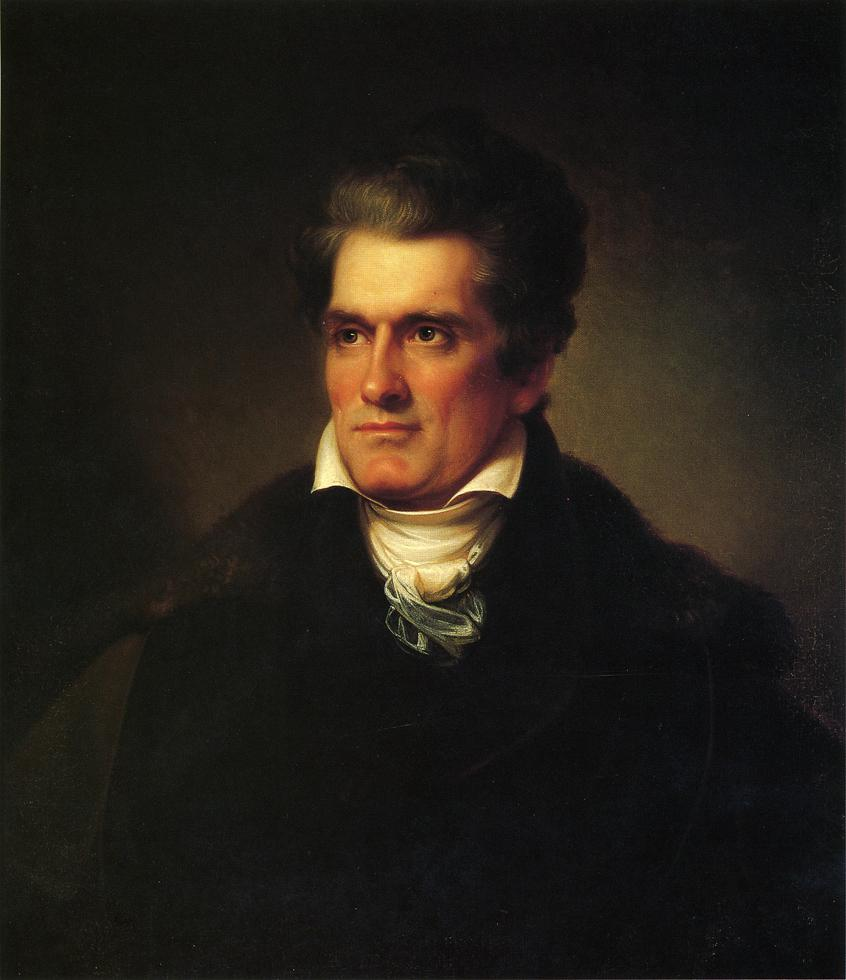
John C. Calhoun in 1834 painted by Rembrandt Peale.

Apuckshunubbee died in Maysville, Kentucky; and Pushmataha died in Washington. Apuckshunubbee was reported to have died from a broken neck caused by a fall from a hotel balcony. Other historians say he fell from a cliff.

According to the report in the Maysville Eagle, Apuckshunnubbe, the great Medal Chief, after supping at Captain Langhorne's on Wednesday last, in the evening attempted to go to the river, missed his way, and was precipitated over the abutment of the road and received so severe contusions to his head and other injuries, as to render his recovery hopeless. He lingered until Friday night, in a perfectly senseless condition, when his soul winged to the presence of the Great Spirit.

— Earl White- Choctaw Nation of Oklahoma

Pushmataha died of croup, even though the disease usually only afflicts infants and young children.

Apuckshunubee's successor was Robert Cole and later Greenwood LeFlore. Pushmataha's successor was Nittakechi. The deaths of these two leaders effectively crippled the Choctaw Nation. Within six years the Choctaw were forced to cede their last remaining territory in Mississippi to the United States.

== See also ==
- List of Choctaw Treaties
- Treaty of Hopewell
- Treaty of Fort Adams
- Treaty of Fort Confederation
- Treaty of Hoe Buckintoopa
- Treaty of Mount Dexter
- Treaty of Fort St. Stephens
- Treaty of Doak's Stand
- Treaty of Dancing Rabbit Creek
- List of treaties
