= Judge Coburn =

Judge Coburn may refer to:

- Donald S. Coburn (born 1939), judge of the New Jersey Superior Court
- John Coburn (Kentucky judge) (1762–1823), judge of the Kentucky Circuit Court and of the Territory of Michigan
- John Coburn (Indiana politician) (1825–1908), judge of the Indiana Court of Common Pleas and of the fifth judicial circuit of Indiana
- Judge Patrick Coburn, fictional judge in the 2011 British TV series, Justice
