= Pinckney's Treaty =

1795 treaty between the US and Spain

Pinckney's Treaty;
Treaty of Friendship, Limits, and Navigation Between Spain and the United States
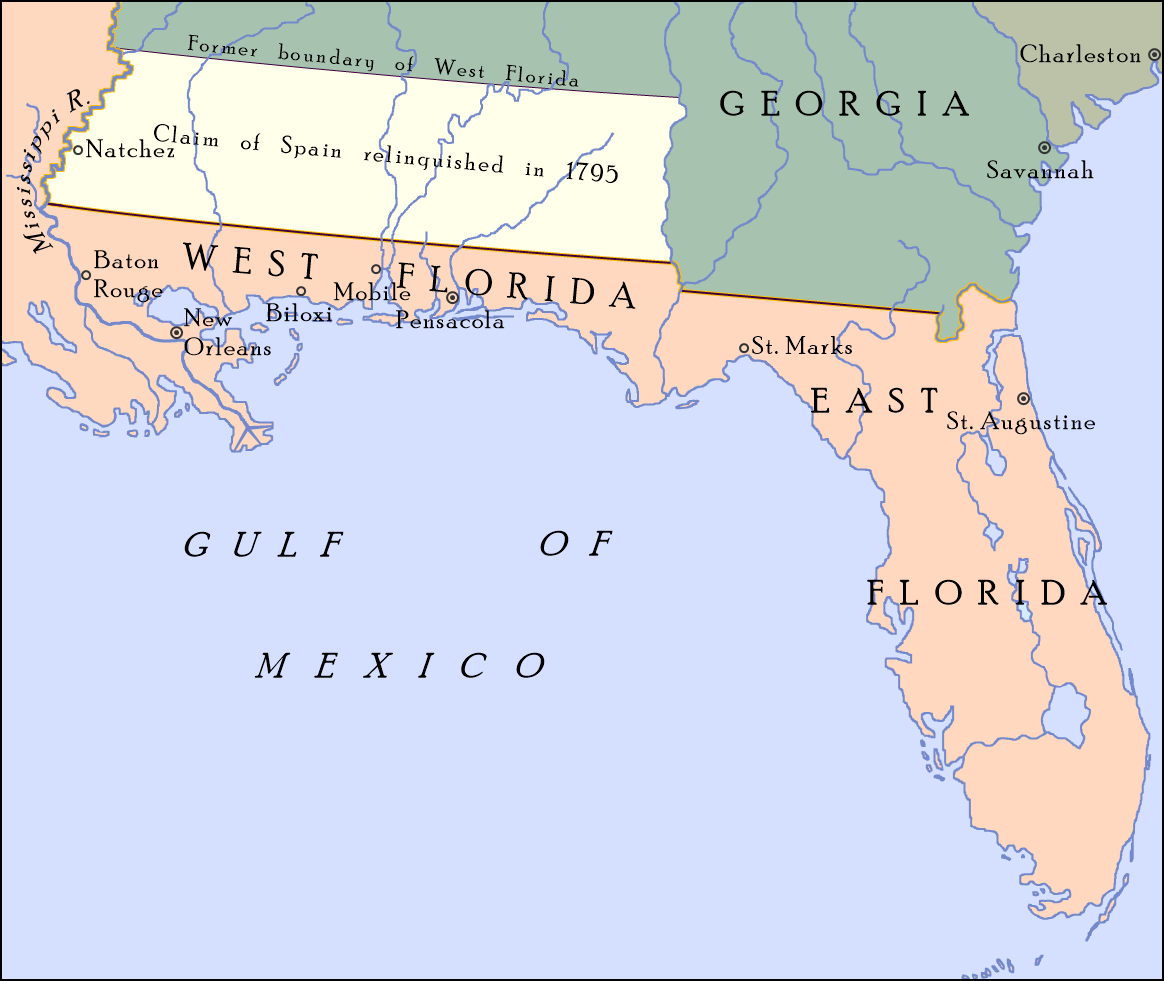
- The treaty established the boundary between the United States and Spanish Florida at 31°N
- Context: Defined the border between the United States and Spanish Florida; guaranteed US navigation rights on the lower Mississippi River
- Signed: 27 October 1795
- Location: San Lorenzo de El Escorial
- Effective: August 2, 1796
- Negotiators: (Spain) Manuel de Godoy; Thomas Pinckney
- Parties: Spain; United States

Pinckney's Treaty, also known as the Treaty of San Lorenzo or the Treaty of Madrid, was signed on October 27, 1795, by the United States and Spain.

It defined the border between the United States and Spanish Florida, and guaranteed the United States navigation rights on the Mississippi River. With this agreement, the first phase of the ongoing border dispute between the two nations in this region, commonly called the West Florida Controversy, came to a close.

Thomas Pinckney negotiated the treaty for the United States and Don Manuel de Godoy represented Spain. It was presented to the United States Senate on February 26, 1796, and, after debate, was ratified on March 7, 1796. It was ratified by Spain on April 25, 1796, and ratifications were exchanged on that date. The treaty was proclaimed on August 2, 1796.

== Background ==
In 1763, Great Britain established two colonies, East Florida and West Florida, out of territory along the northern Gulf of Mexico coast ceded from France and Spain after the French and Indian War, which formed part of the larger Seven Years' War. The British received all of Spanish Florida from Spain and received the portion of French Louisiana east of the Mississippi River, New Orleans, from France as well as all of French Louisiana west of the Mississippi that had been secretly given to Spain the previous year. Both East Florida and West Florida were never extensively settled by the British and were ceded to Spain (which ruled both provinces as separate and apart from Louisiana) in the 1783 Treaty of Paris at the end of the American Revolutionary War. When the transaction was made however, the boundaries of West Florida, which had changed while under British sovereignty, were not specified.

In 1763, West Florida's northern border was initially set at the 31st parallel north, but it was moved in 1764 to 32° 28′, the junction of the Mississippi River and the Yazoo River and now the location of Vicksburg, Mississippi, to give the West Floridians more territory, including the Natchez District and the Tombigbee District. After reacquiring the colony, Spain insisted that its West Florida claim extended fully to 32° 28′, but the U.S. asserted that the land between 31° and 32° 28′ had always been British territory and so rightfully belonged to the United States.

In 1784, the Spanish closed New Orleans to American goods coming down the Mississippi River. In 1795, the border was settled, and the United States and Spain concluded a trade agreement. New Orleans was reopened, and Americans could transfer goods without paying cargo fees, the right of deposit, when they transferred goods from one ship to another.

== Terms ==
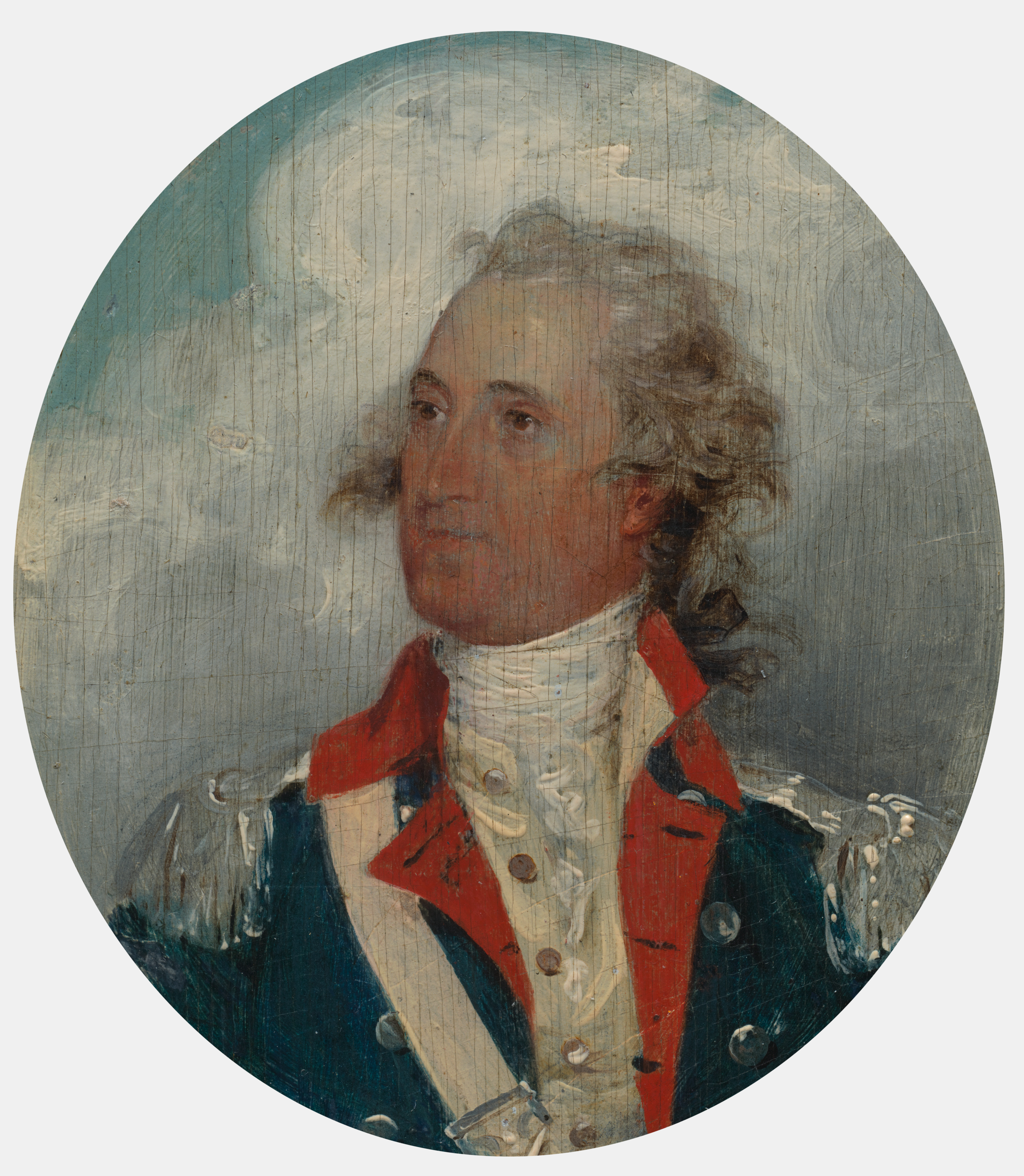
Thomas Pinckney

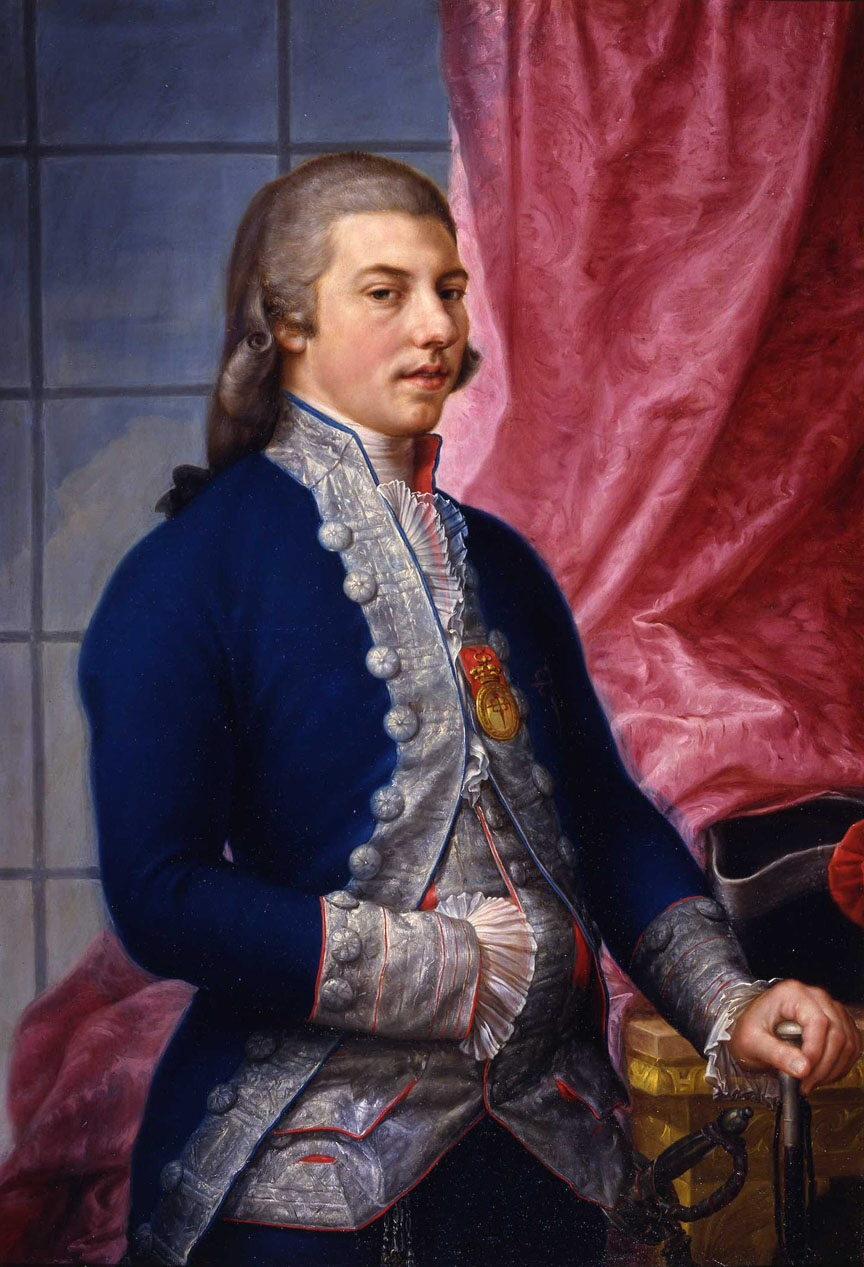
Manuel Godoy

=== Article II ===
The southern boundary of the United States with the Spanish colonies of East Florida and West Florida was established as a line beginning on the Mississippi River at the 31st parallel north, the 1763 line, drawn due east to the middle of the Chattahoochee River, then downstream along the middle of the river to the junction with the Flint River, then due east to the headwaters of the St. Marys River, and then along the middle of the channel to the Atlantic Ocean.

=== Article III ===
A joint Spanish–American team was stipulated for surveying the boundary line.

=== Article IV ===
The western boundary of the United States with the Spanish colony of Louisiana was established as the middle of the Mississippi River from the northern boundary of the United States (how far north the Mississippi extended was still unknown) to the 31st degree north latitude, and both Spanish subjects and U.S. citizens would have free navigation along the full length of the Mississippi from its source to the ocean.

=== Article V ===
The United States and Spain agreed not to incite native tribes to warfare and to promote mutually-beneficial trade relationships by tribes on both sides of the border. Previously, Spain had supplied weapons to local tribes for many years. The agreement put the lands of the Chickasaw and Choctaw Nations of American Indians in the new boundaries of the United States.

=== Articles VI and VII ===
Spain and the United States also agreed to protect and defend the vessels of the other party anywhere in their jurisdictions and not to detain or embargo each other's citizens or vessels.

== Ramifications ==
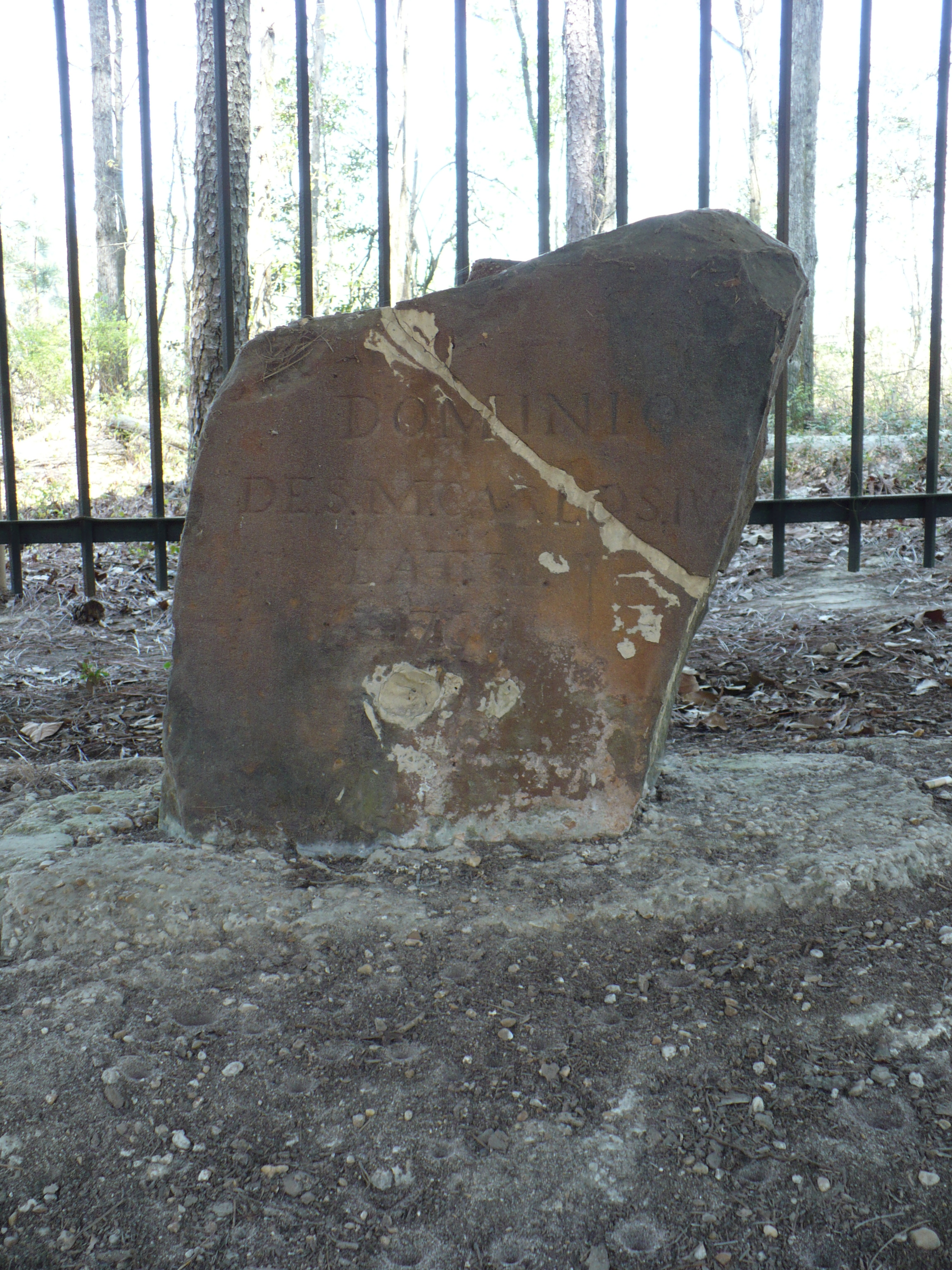
"Ellicott's Stone" boundary marker along the 31st parallel now in northern Mobile County, Alabama

A joint Spanish–American team surveyed the boundary line. Andrew Ellicott served as the head of the U.S. contingent. The region that Spain relinquished its claim by Pinckney's Treaty was organized by Congress as Mississippi Territory on April 7, 1798. Natchez was the territory's first and only capital.

Grant (1997) argues that the treaty was critical for the emergence of American expansionism, later known as "Manifest destiny," because control of the Natchez and Tombigbee districts was needed for dominance of the Southwest by the United States. The collapse of Spanish power in the region was inevitable, as Americans poured into the district, and very few Spaniards lived there. Spain gave up the area because of international politics, not local unrest. Spanish rule was accepted by the French and British settlers near Natchez. Relations with the Indians were tranquil. However, with the loss of Natchez, Spain's frontier was no longer secure, and the rest of its territory was gradually lost.

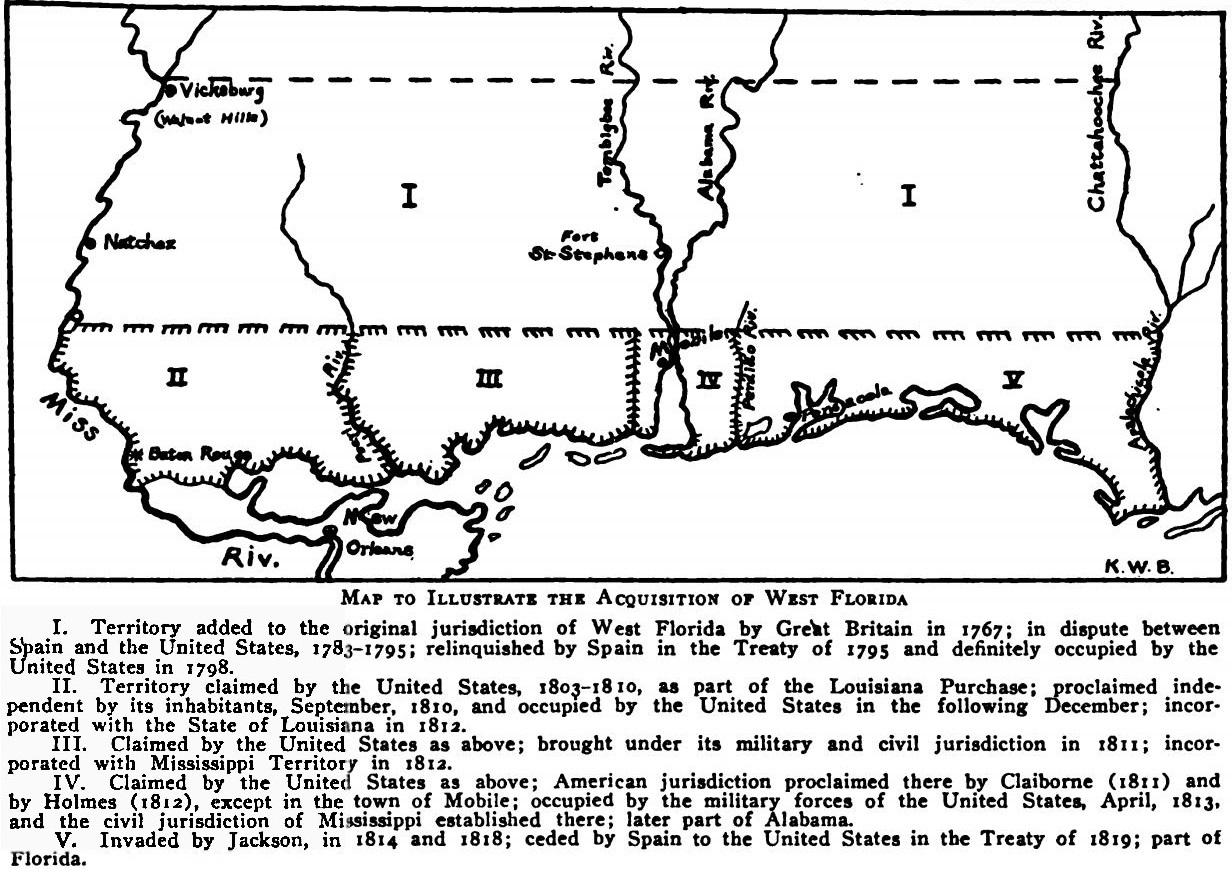
Annotated map of the territorial changes of British and Spanish West Florida, 1767 to 1819.

Under the secret Third Treaty of San Ildefonso of October 1, 1800, Spanish Louisiana, comprising both the vast territory west of the Mississippi and New Orleans, was formally retroceded to France, but Spain continued to administer it. Again, as in 1783, the boundaries of the territory being exchanged were not specified. As a result, when France and the United States concluded the Louisiana Purchase in 1803, a new dispute, the second phase of the West Florida Controversy, arose.

This time, the disagreement was over whether the portion of West Florida that was first under British and then Spanish control since 1763 (between the Mississippi and Perdido Rivers) was included in the 1801 treaty and thus the Louisiana Purchase. The United States laid claim to the region by asserting it to be included. Spain held that such a claim was baseless. While the politicians squabbled, American and British settlers in the region declared an independent Republic of West Florida in 1810. Its capital was located at St. Francisville. It was quickly annexed by the United States and incorporated into the Territory of Orleans, which joined the Union as the state of Louisiana in 1812. The present-day Louisiana civil parishes (equivalent to counties elsewhere in the United States) which had been part of the former republic are referred to as the "Florida Parishes."

Also in 1812, the U.S. annexed the Mobile District of West Florida between the Perdido and Pearl Rivers and declared that it had been included in the Louisiana Purchase. Spain disputed that and maintained its claim over the area. The following year, a federal statute was secretly enacted authorizing the president to take full possession of the area with the use of military force as deemed necessary. Accordingly, General James Wilkinson occupied this district with a military contingent. The Spanish colonial commandant offered no resistance. The annexed land was incorporated into the Mississippi Territory and partitioned five years later when the Alabama Territory was established.

In 1819 the United States and Spain negotiated the Adams–Onís Treaty in which Spain ceded all of both West Florida and East Florida into the United States. Since the mid-19th century, the southern (east–west) boundary established by Pinckney's Treaty has formed the state line between:

- Florida and Georgia
- Florida and Alabama – between the Chattahoochee and Perdido Rivers
- Louisiana and Mississippi – between the Pearl and Mississippi Rivers

The line is not a state line between the Pearl and Perdido Rivers to provide Mississippi and Alabama with access to the Gulf of Mexico.

== See also ==
Anglo-Spanish War (1796–1808)

== Sources ==
- Bemis, Samuel Flagg (1926). Pinckney's Treaty: A Study of America's Advantage from Europe's Distress, 1783–1800 (1960 ed.).
