= Harry Toulmin (Unitarian minister) =

American politician

2nd Superior Court Judge for the Tombigbee District of the Mississippi Territory
- In office 1804–1819
- Appointed by: Thomas Jefferson
- Preceded by: Ephraim Kirby
- Succeeded by: Office abolished

2nd Secretary of State of Kentucky
- In office October 13, 1796 – September 5, 1804
- Governor: James Garrard
- Preceded by: James Brown
- Succeeded by: John Rowan

President of Transylvania Seminary
- In office February 1794 – April 1796

Personal details
- Born: April 7, 1766 Taunton, Somerset, England
- Died: November 11, 1823 (aged 57) Fort Stoddert, Washington County, Alabama
- Spouse(s): Ann Tremlett; Martha Johnson
- Relations: Son of Joshua Toulmin; Grandfather of Harry Theophilus Toulmin & Theophilus T. Garrard
- Education: Hoxton Academy
- Occupation: Unitarian minister

Harry Toulmin (sometimes Henry Toulmin) (April 7, 1766 – November 11, 1823) was a Unitarian minister and politician figure. The son of noted Dissenting minister Joshua Toulmin, Toulmin fled his native England for the United States after he and his followers were persecuted for their beliefs. He arrived in Virginia in 1793, and aided by recommendations from Thomas Jefferson and James Monroe, he was chosen president of Transylvania Seminary (now Transylvania University) in Lexington, Kentucky. His Unitarian views, however, offended many of the orthodox Presbyterian members of Transylvania's board of regents, and Toulmin resigned after two years.

Shortly after his resignation, Toulmin was appointed Secretary of State of Kentucky by Governor James Garrard. He influenced Garrard – a Baptist minister – to adopt some doctrines of Socinianism, for which he was expelled from the local Baptist association, ending his ministry. As Secretary of State, Toulmin endorsed the Kentucky Resolutions and revised the state's code of laws in conjunction with Attorney General James Blair. After the expiration of his term as Secretary of State in 1804, Thomas Jefferson appointed him Superior Court Judge for the Tombigbee District of the Mississippi Territory. He was the first U.S. district judge to hold court on Alabama soil. As the highest-ranking authority in the large territory, he tried to prevent residents in his jurisdiction from conducting raids against the Spanish in West Florida and from participating in the Creek War between two rival factions of Creek Indians. When the state of Alabama was formed from part of Toulmin's district, he helped write the new state's constitution and was elected to the state legislature. Again, he was asked to compile a digest of the region's laws, which he completed in 1823.

Toulmin died in Washington County, Alabama on November 11, 1823. Because of his work compiling the laws of several states, later historians called him the "frontier Justinian". His grandson, Harry Theophilus Toulmin was appointed district judge for the U.S. District Court for the Southern District of Alabama by President Grover Cleveland in 1886. In 2005, Toulmin was inducted into the Alabama Lawyer's Hall of Fame, and in December 2009 he was honored with the installation of a plaque in front of the Baldwin County, Alabama, courthouse.

== Early life and family ==
Toulmin was born April 7, 1766, in Taunton, Somersetshire, England. His parents were Joshua Toulmin, a noted Dissenting minister, and his wife Jane (Smith) Toulmin. He received little formal education, but frequently read books in his mother's bookstore and benefited from listening to conversations between his father and other noted ministers such as Joseph Priestley and Theophilus Lindsey. After attending Hoxton Academy and studying under Thomas Barnes and William Hawes, he followed his father into the ministry in 1786.

During his ministry in England, Toulmin served two Dissenting congregations in Lancashire. From 1786 to 1788, he was pastor of a church in Monton, and from 1787 to 1793, he served another congregation at Chowbent Chapel in Atherton. He soon had nearly 1,000 followers, Many of his followers supported the French Revolution, attracting the attention of anti-dissenting partisans in England. A group of these partisans once took advantage of Toulmin's absence to threaten his house, necessitating his swift return to protect his family. Upon arriving, he was able to break up the mob via diplomacy alone.

About 1787, Toulmin married Ann Tremlett. The couple had nine children, five of whom survived infancy. In 1808, one of these children, Lucinda Jane, married Colonel Daniel Garrard, the son of James Garrard, the second governor of Kentucky. After the death of Toulmin's first wife, he married Martha Johnson in 1812. They had one child together.

== Resettlement in Kentucky ==
Spurred by the persecution endured by his followers and himself, in 1792 Toulmin published an anonymous pamphlet entitled "Thoughts on Emigration", containing his thoughts on members of the Dissenter movement relocating to another country. The following year, his congregants raised enough money to send him to the United States to explore the possibility of relocating there. Dr. Priestly gave him letters of introduction to Thomas Jefferson and James Madison to present on his arrival. During his two-month voyage from England to Norfolk, Virginia, Toulmin kept a diary, which was later published under the title The Western Country in 1793; Reports on Kentucky and Virginia.

Following his arrival in the United States, Toulmin wrote letters back to England, giving potential immigrants information they would need to know for their journey; these letters were published in the local Monthly Magazine. The following year, he published A Description of Kentucky, a pamphlet encouraging emigration from Europe to Kentucky.

After seeing Toulmin's letters of recommendation from Jefferson and Madison, the board of trustees of Transylvania Seminary (now Transylvania University) in Lexington, Kentucky, elected him president of the seminary in February 1794. He was the first president of the seminary who was not a Presbyterian, and his election was effected when the Baptist and more liberal members of the board united against the more conservative Presbyterian members. His Unitarian views offended many of the conservative board members, and at their insistence, the Kentucky General Assembly passed legislation requiring a unanimous vote of the board of regents to re-elect the seminary's president. Toulmin resigned in protest in April 1796.

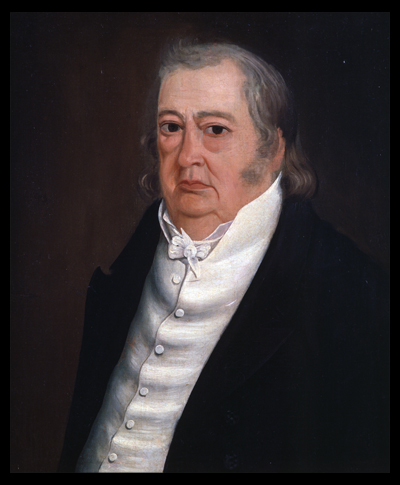
James Garrard appointed Toulmin as his Secretary of State.

Shortly after Toulmin's resignation, James Garrard, a Baptist minister who had supported Toulmin as a trustee of Transylvania, was elected governor of Kentucky. At first, Garrard elected to re-appoint sitting Secretary of State James Brown, but when Brown retired in October 1796, Garrard appointed Toulmin as his replacement. He served in this capacity from 1796 to 1804, spanning both of Garrard's consecutive terms as governor. As a result of Garrard's relationship with Toulmin, he began to accept some tenets of Unitarianism, specifically the doctrines of Socinianism. By 1802, Garrard and his associate Augustine Eastin had not only adopted these beliefs, but had indoctrinated their Baptist congregations with them as well. The Elkhorn Baptist Association condemned Garrard and Eastin's beliefs as heretical and tried to persuade the two men to abandon them. When that effort failed, the Association ceased correspondence and association with both men. This event ended Garrard's ministry and his association with the Baptist church.

As Secretary of State, Toulmin was signatory to the Kentucky Resolutions, the legislature's official protest of the Alien and Sedition Acts, which he regarded as an "unwarranted government intrusion into free thought, free association, and free speech". In 1801, he published The Magistrate's Assistant, a guide to the state's magisterial laws. He also promoted public awareness of governmental activity by compiling and publishing the proceedings of the General Assembly as The Public Acts of the General Assembly. Government officials chose Toulmin and state Attorney General James Blair to revise the state's code of laws. The results of their work – a three-volume tome entitled Review of the Criminal Law of Kentucky – was published in 1806.

Near the end of Governor Garrard's term, he appointed Toulmin registrar of the state land office. Toulmin was the first of six candidates that the state senate rejected in a bitter showdown between Garrard and the legislature. The seventh candidate, John Adair was finally confirmed by the senate.

== Life in Alabama ==
Toulmin supported President Thomas Jefferson's re-election bid in 1804. Following his victory, Jefferson appointed Toulmin to succeed Ephraim Kirby as Superior Court Judge for the Tombigbee District of the Mississippi Territory in 1804. Because Kirby only served six months and never held court in the present-day state of Alabama, Toulmin is regarded as the first U.S. federal judge on Alabama soil.

Toulmin and his family relocated to Fort Stoddert, just north of the border between the United States and the Spanish territory of West Florida. Toulmin's district was large – by his estimate, 340 miles long and 330 miles wide – and he served as minister, physician, judge, postmaster, and diplomat for the area. With James Caller and Lemuel Henry he constructed the first road connecting his district to Natchez. He published both the Mississippi Magistrate's Guide and The Laws of Mississippi in 1807.

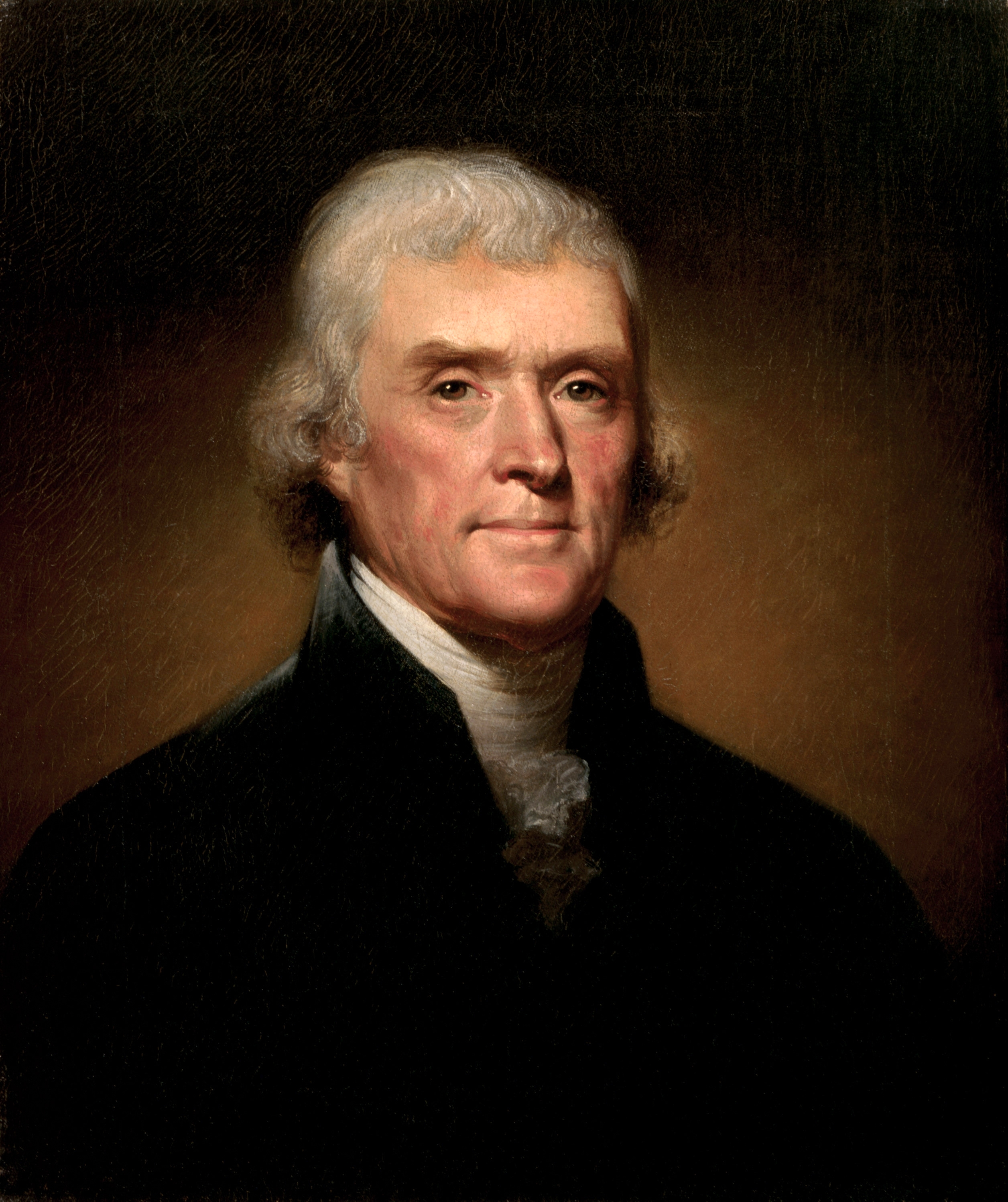
Thomas Jefferson appointed Toulmin to a federal judgeship.

The residents of Tombigbee District objected to Spanish control of Mobile Bay, which prevented them from accessing the Mississippi River and the port of New Orleans. In 1805, he formally petitioned Congress to intervene, but they did not. Although he personally favored U.S. annexation of West Florida, he defended it as an independent nation until the annexation occurred. In 1807, he arrested former Vice-President Aaron Burr; Burr had been accused of conspiring to create an independent state in the Southwest that would belong to neither the U.S. nor Spain. In 1810, he arrested Reuben Kemper and two other members of a group styled the "Mobile Society" following an unsuccessful attempt to "liberate" Mobile and Pensacola. Toulmin's actions were seen as supportive of Spain, and a Baldwin County grand jury charged him with acting on behalf of Spain. A congressional investigation cleared him of any wrongdoing in May 1812. Toulmin was less successful in preventing residents of his district from entering the Creek War between two rival factions of Creek Indians.

In 1817, Alabama Territory was formed from part of Mississippi Territory. When the state of Alabama was created from part of the Tombigbee District in 1819, Toulmin was chosen to represent Baldwin County at the state's constitutional convention in July 1819. He served on the Committee of Fifteen that drafted the first Constitution of Alabama. The document was influenced by the Kentucky Constitution of 1800, which contained more democratic provisions than some of the older state constitutions.

After the constitutional convention, he was elected to the Alabama Legislature. In 1821, his fellow legislators chose him to write a digest of the state's laws. The final product, Digest of the Laws of the State of Alabama, was published in 1823. It comprised over 1,000 pages and contained the laws of Mississippi and Alabama territories as well as the acts passed by the Alabama Legislature to date.

Toulmin maintained a cotton plantation in Washington County, Alabama. Although he was opposed to slavery when initially arriving in the United States, and he advocated for provisions in the Alabama Constitution that permitted the eventual emancipation of slaves, nevertheless he eventually came to be a slave owner himself. In his will, he provided for one of his slaves to be freed, deeming him "fit for freedom which few negroes are."

== Death and legacy ==
Toulmin died on his plantation on November 11, 1823. He is presumed to have been buried on his plantation, but the exact location of his grave is unknown. Because of his work in codifying the laws of several states and territories, later literary scholars referred to Toulmin as the "frontier Justinian", an allusion to Byzantine Emperor Justinian I, who was known for codifying the empire's laws.

One of Toulmin's sons became a prominent state legislator in Alabama, and his grandson, Harry Theophilus Toulmin was appointed district judge for the U.S. District Court for the Southern District of Alabama by President Grover Cleveland in 1886.

In 1944, a Liberty ship, the SS Harry Toulmin, was named for him, built under Maritime Commission contract (MCE hull 2453), laid down on 10 January 1944 by the Delta Shipbuilding Co., Inc., New Orleans, Louisiana; however, it was subsequently launched as the USS Segnius.

Toulmin was elected to the Alabama Lawyer's Hall of Fame in 2005. A plaque honoring Toulmin was placed in front of the Baldwin County, Alabama, courthouse in December 2009.

== Works published by Harry Toulmin ==
- Toulmin, Harry (1806). The American Attorney's Pocket Book: Being a Collection from the Best Authorities of Approved Precedents in Conveyancing: Interspersed with Various Legal Provisions from the Statutes of Several of the United States. Mathew Carey.
- Toulmin, Harry (1806). The American Public Prosecutor's Assistant: Being a Collection of Precedents in Criminal Prosecutions, More Immediately Founded on the Common Law, and of the Statutes of Kentucky, but Generally Applicable to the Laws of the Several States of America. W. Hunter.
- Toulmin, Harry (1806). The Clerk's Magazine and American Conveyancer's Assistant: Being a Collection Adopted to the United States: of the Most Approved Precedents of Affidavits, Agreements and Covenants [etc.] Mathew Carey.
- Toulmin, Harry (1802). A Collection of All the Public and Permanent Acts of the General Assembly of Kentucky Which are Now in Force. W. Hunter.
- Toulmin, Harry (1823). A Digest of the Laws of the State of Alabama: containing the statutes and resolutions in force at the end of the General Assembly in January, 1823 : to which is added, an appendix containing the Declaration of Independence, the Constitution of the United States, the Act Authorizing the People of Alabama to Form a Constitution and State Government and the constitution of the State of Alabama : with a copious index. Ginn & Curtis.
- Toulmin, Harry (1807). The Magistrate's Assistant: Being an Alphabetical Illustration of Sundry Legal Principles and Usages, Accompanied with a Variety of Necessary Forms: Compiled for the Use of the Justices of the Peace, in the Mississippi Territory. Samuel Terrell.
- Toulmin, Harry (1817). Petition from the Citizens of the Counties of Clarke, Monroe, Washington, Mobile, and Baldwin, in the Alabama Territory. October 1817: December 30, 1817. Referred to the Select Committee, Appointed on the 17th Instant, on a Memorial of the Mississippi Convention, Relating to an Extension of the Limits of that State. E. De Krafft.
- Toulmin, Harry; James Blair (1804). A Review of the Criminal Law of the Commonwealth of Kentucky. W. Hunter.
- Toulmin, Harry (1807). The Statutes of the Mississippi Territory, Revised and Digested by the Authority of the General Assembly. Samuel Terrell.

== See also ==
- List of Mississippi Territory judges

Political offices
Preceded by James Brown	Secretary of State of Kentucky; 1804–1807	Succeeded by John Rowan
