= West Florida Controversy =

Two border disputes that involved Spain and the United States

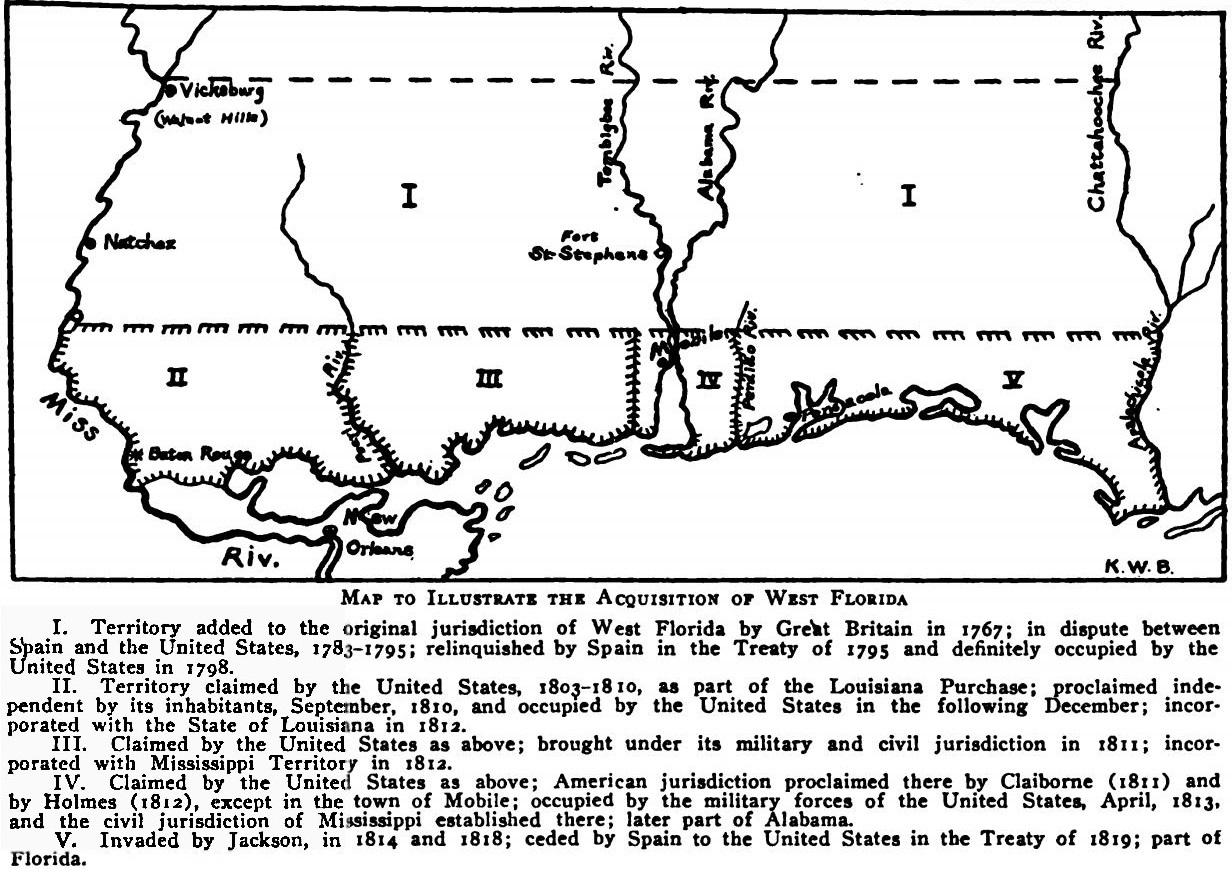
Annotated map of the territorial changes of British and Spanish West Florida

The West Florida Controversy included two border disputes that involved Spain and the United States in relation to the region known as West Florida over a period of 37 years. The first dispute commenced immediately after Spain received the colonies of West and East Florida from the Kingdom of Great Britain following the American Revolutionary War. Initial disagreements were settled with Pinckney's Treaty of 1795.

The second dispute arose following the Louisiana Purchase in 1803. The controversy peaked with the secession of part of West Florida, known as the "Republic of West Florida", from Spanish control in 1810, and its subsequent forcible taking and annexation by the United States. In 1819 the United States and Spain negotiated the Adams–Onís Treaty, in which the United States purchased the remainder of Florida from Spain. The treaty was ratified in 1821.

== First border dispute ==
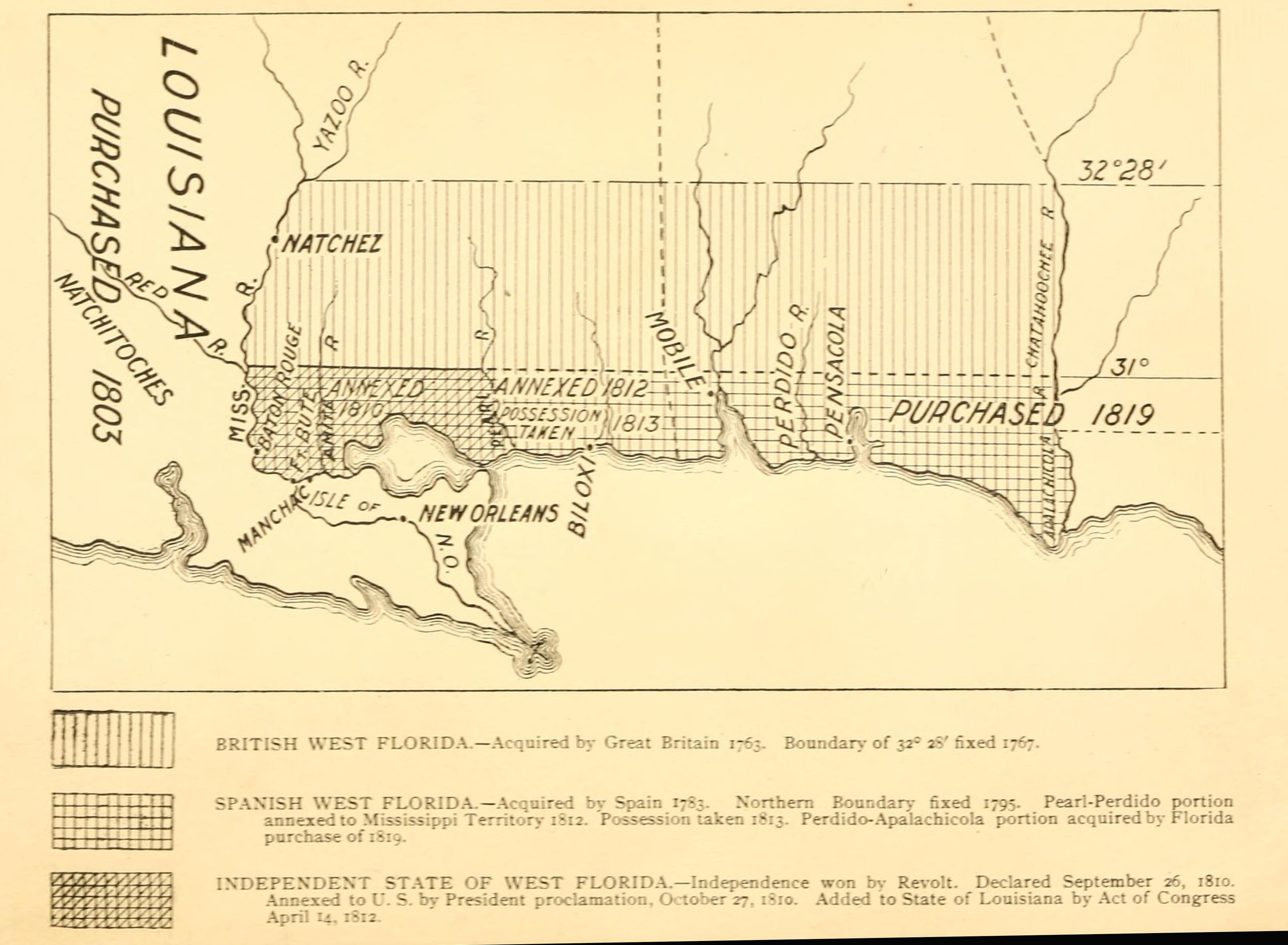
Map showing piecemeal reduction of Spanish control in West Florida

Britain formed the territory of West Florida out of territory it received from Spain and France in the 1763 Treaty of Paris, which ended the French and Indian War (the Seven Years' War). In this treaty it received all of Spanish Florida from Spain, and nearly all of French Louisiana east of the Mississippi River from France. Finding the new territory too big to govern from one capital, the British divided it into two new colonies: West Florida, with its capital at Pensacola, and East Florida, with its capital at St. Augustine.

Twenty years later, Britain ceded both Floridas to Spain following the American Revolutionary War. They did not, however, specify the boundaries of West Florida, which had changed over the course of British stewardship. In the British period West Florida's northern border was initially set at the 31st parallel north but was moved to 32° 28′ in 1767 in order to give the West Floridians more territory, including the Natchez District and the Tombigbee District. Spain insisted that its West Florida claim extended fully to 32° 28′, but the United States asserted that the land between 31° and 32° 28′ had always been British territory, and therefore rightfully belonged to the United States. After years of disagreement, the dispute was finally resolved with Pinckney's Treaty in 1795, in which both parties agreed on the 31st parallel as the boundary between the United States and West Florida.

== Second border dispute ==
Before 1762 France had owned and administered the land west of the Perdido River as part of La Louisiane. In 1762 France signed a secret treaty with Spain that, upon being revealed in 1764, had effectively ceded all French lands west of the Mississippi River, plus the island of New Orleans, to Spain.

At the end of the Seven Years' War in 1763, France ceded its remaining lands east of the Mississippi River, which included the land between the Perdido and Mississippi Rivers, to Great Britain, while Spain also ceded its Florida territory to Britain. The British created the colony of West Florida out of the French and Spanish cessions. In 1783 Great Britain returned East Florida and transferred West Florida to Spain, who ruled both provinces as separate and apart from Louisiana. In 1800, under duress from Napoleon of France, Spain agreed to restore Louisiana and the island of New Orleans to France, who in conversation had promised to return them to Spain should France ever relinquish them. On 15 October 1802, Charles IV issued a royal bill that made effective the transfer of Louisiana to France ("with the same extent that it currently has, that it had under the power of France when she ceded it to my royal crown") and the withdrawal of Spanish troops in the territory. When France then sold the Louisiana Territory to the United States in 1803, a dispute arose between Spain and the United States regarding whether West Florida was part of the Louisiana Purchase. The United States laid claim to the region of West Florida between the Mississippi and Perdido Rivers, asserting it had been part of French Louisiana. Spain held that such a claim was baseless.

In 1810, a group of discontented American and British settlers in the area of Baton Rouge learned that the Spanish colonial governor, who had feigned sympathy, was in fact mounting a force against them. They revolted by overrunning a Spanish garrison at Fort San Carlos in Baton Rouge on September 23, 1810, and declared the independence of the Republic of West Florida on September 26. On October 27, the United States president proclaimed that the territory should be annexed, and Spain, then embroiled in the Peninsular War with France, could do little to resist. On December 10, the United States military completed the forcible occupation and acquiescence of the Republic of West Florida.

In 1819 the United States and Spain negotiated the Adams–Onís Treaty, in which Spain transferred West Florida and all of East Florida to the United States in exchange for expunging American spoliation claims.

== Controversy in detail ==
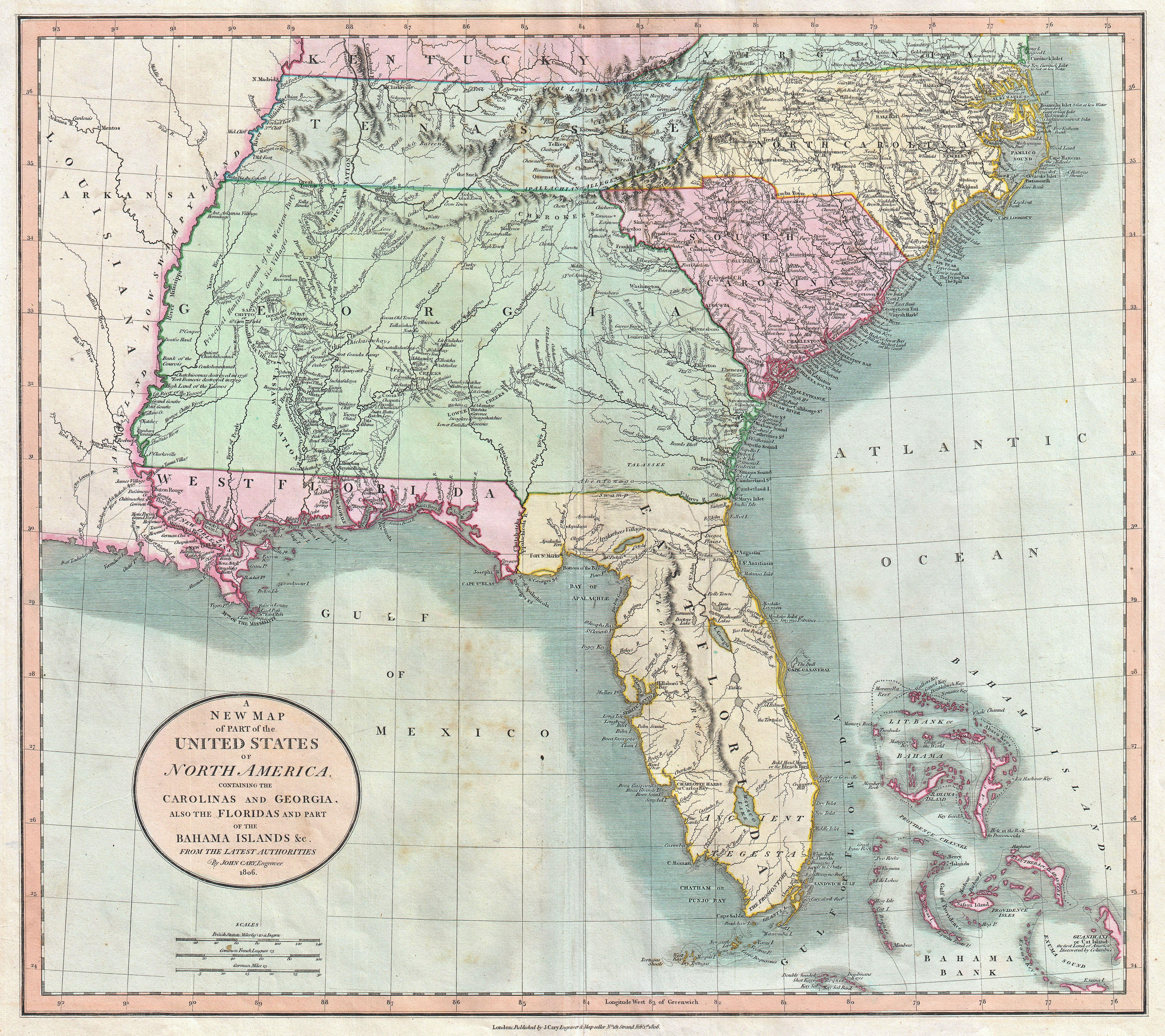
1806 John Cary map shows West Florida (including Pensacola, which was not part of the U.S. claim) in the hands of Spain, separate from the U.S.-held Louisiana Purchase.

By terms of the treaty following the Seven Years' War "in 1763, what was then known as Louisiana was divided between Great Britain and Spain. France lost by this treaty all her possessions in North America. In addition to Canada, she ceded to Great Britain the river and port of Mobile and all her possessions on the left side of the Mississippi, except New Orleans and the island on which it was situated. The residue of Louisiana was ceded to Spain in a separate and secret treaty. The cession of Florida to Great Britain was the price paid for the restoration of Cuba to Spain. Great Britain divided the territory into East and West Florida." ^{pp. 288–291}

"Valid title by possession of her part of the ceded territory was acquired by Great Britain at once (1763). Spain failed to make good by occupancy her title until 1769, when [Alejandro] O'Reilly took formal possession. For six years, therefore, the Louisiana as France possessed it, and as Spain received it, included no territory between the Mississippi and Perdido rivers. In 1779-81 Spain acquired West Florida, as well as East Florida by right of conquest, confirmed by the treaty of 1783. By no logical process of reasoning can it be shown that Spain's independent title to West Florida thus acquired should be included in Spain's previously acquired title to Louisiana and the island of New Orleans," according to Chambers. ^{p. 48}

=== Treaty of St. Ildefonso ===
"By the treaty of October 1, 1800, between the French Republic and Spain, known as the St. Ildefonso treaty, Spain made a retrocession to France of the province of Louisiana as at that time possessed by Spain, and such as it was when France possessed it. … It is important, in view of subsequent discussions and negotiations, to bear in mind that in the transfer [of Louisiana to the United States] the identical language was employed that had been used in 1800, so that the government of the United States was subrogated, in express terms, to the rights of France and of Spain. … The United States insisted that by the treaty of 1800 Spain ceded the disputed territory [of West Florida], as part of Louisiana, to France, and that France, in turn, in 1803, ceded it to the United States. Spain, with equal earnestness and persistence, maintained that her cession to France comprehended what was at that time denominated Louisiana, consisting of the island of New Orleans and the country west of the Mississippi. … The very forcible contention of the United States was enfeebled somewhat by the declaration of Talleyrand, that by the treaty of St. Ildefonso Spain retroceded no part of the territory east of the Iberville, which had been held and known as West Florida, and that, in all the negotiations between the two governments, Spain had constantly refused to cede any part of the Floridas, even from the Mississippi to the Mobile." ^{pp. 288–291}

"Spain upheld her claim to the Floridas and consistently insisted from beginning to end of the territorial controversy with the United States that no just interpretation of the St. Ildefonso treaty and of its resultant Louisiana Purchase treaty would include any part of West Florida in the Louisiana retroceded to France and sold by the nation to the United States." ^{p 49} The governor of West Florida, Vizente Folch and his superior, the governor of Cuba, [Marqués de] Someruelos, both informed the governor of Louisiana, Juan Manuel de Salcedo, that Spain retroceded to France exactly the territory that it had received forty years before. Therefore Louisiana did not include West Florida, which Spain had acquired from Great Britain. ^{p. 87–88}

The clause in Article III of the St. Ildefonso treaty, "the 'extent that it now has in the hands of Spain' did not mean to include West Florida, for the latter was separate from Louisiana in the Spanish mind; and in governmental ordinances and treaties the Floridas are always specified as distinct from Louisiana, Cuba and other Spanish possessions. 'And that it had when France possessed it.' When France possessed it between 1763 and 1769, ... it did not include West Florida. 'And such as it should be after the treaties subsequently entered into between Spain and the other States.' Spain entered into no treaty with other States relative to Louisiana until she ceded it back to France in 1800. … The Louisiana ceded to Spain by France, and retroceded by Spain to France, did not extend to the Perdido river. The only territory east of the Mississippi river included in the Louisiana transferred and retransferred, was … the Island of Orleans." ^{pp. 49–50}

"No better argument can be made to support this statement than the unanswerable letter by Talleyrand" of November 8, 1804, in reply to Monroe: ^{pp. 50–52}

France, in giving up Louisiana to the United States, transferred to them all the rights over that territory which she had acquired from Spain. She could not nor did she wish to cede any other; and that no room might be left for doubt in this respect, she repeated in her treaty of 30th of April, 1803, the literal expression of the treaty of St. Ildefonso, by which she had acquired that colony two years before. Nor was it stipulated in her treaty of the year 1801 that the acquisition of Louisiana by France was a retrocession; that is to say that Spain restored to France what she had received from her in 1762. … [T]he same day France ceded to England by the preliminaries of peace, all the territory to the eastward. Of this Spain received no part and could therefore give back none to France. All … bears the name of Florida. It has been constantly designated in that way during the time that Spain held it. It bears the same name in the treaties of limits between Spain and the United States; and in different notes of Mr. Livingston of a later date than the treaty of retrocession in which the name of Louisiana is given to the territory on the west side of the Mississippi; of Florida to that on the east side of it. … [Y]ou must think as unnatural, after all the changes of sovereignty which that part of America has undergone, to give the name of Louisiana to the Mobile district as to territory more north of it, on the same bank of the river, which formerly belonged to France. These observations, sir, will be sufficient to dispel every kind of doubt with regard to the extent of the retrocession made by Spain to France. … It was under this impression that the Spanish and French Plenipotentiaries negotiated. … [During] the whole course of these negotiations, the Spanish government has constantly refused to cede any part of the Floridas. … [M]oreover, … Gen. Bournouville was charged to open a new negotiation with Spain for the acquisition of the Floridas. His project which has not been followed by any treaty is an evident proof that France had not acquired by the treaty retroceding Louisiana the country east of the Mississippi. ^{pp. 50–52}

Napoleon's instructions to the French envoys at Madrid and to his General Victor-Perrin, who was to take possession of Louisiana for France, expressly followed the Treaty of 1763, and thus excluded West Florida from the cession in the treaty of St. Ildefonso. All documents relating to the [1801] transfer are to the same effect. ^{p. 82}

=== Shifting American position ===
Previous to May, 1803, U.S. envoy Robert Livingston had contended that West Florida formed no part of Louisiana. However, the ambiguous third article of the treaty of St. Ildefonso lent itself to his purpose, although he had to adopt an interpretation that France had not asserted nor Spain allowed. ^{p 83} Chambers arrives at what he calls the key to Mr. Livingston's sudden change of conviction concerning West Florida: "It had been and was the desire of the United States to acquire West Florida and the Island of Orleans. [James] Monroe had assented to the purchase of Louisiana instead. If Livingston could formulate a reasonable theory upon which the United States could base a claim to West Florida the glory would be his and his alone." ^{pp. 43–44}

Monroe made a detailed examination of each clause of the third article. He interpreted the first clause as if Spain since 1783 had considered West Florida as part of Louisiana. The second clause only served to render the first clause clearer. The third clause referred to the treaties of 1783 and 1795, and was designed to safeguard the rights of the United States. This clause then simply gave effect to the others. ^{pp. 84–85}

According to Monroe, France never dismembered Louisiana while it was in her possession (as he regarded November 3, 1762, as the termination date of French possession). After 1783 Spain reunited West Florida to Louisiana, thus completing the province as France possessed it, with the exception of those portions controlled by the United States. By a strict interpretation of the treaty, therefore, Spain might be required to cede to the United States such territory west of the Perdido as once belonged to France. ^{p 84-85} Secretary of State James Madison directed Livingston and Monroe "to collect the proofs necessary to substantiate their claim to the Perdido." ^{pp. 87–88}

In the autumn, 1803, Jefferson "embodied his views in a pamphlet entitled, 'The Limits and Bounds of Louisiana.'" Jefferson had asked some U.S. officials in the territorial border area "to give him their views on Louisiana cartography. Daniel Clark, the best informed of them, did not believe the cession extended beyond the line laid down in the Treaty of 1763, and [William] Dunbar coincided with his view. … [William C. C.] Claiborne and John Sibley of Natchitoches were inclined to favor the claim to the Perdido, but their views were evidently determined by policy rather than precise information. The substance of their replies afforded the president little comfort." ^{p. 87–88}

On December 20, 1803, the French commissioner to Louisiana transferred New Orleans to the American commissioners, General James Wilkinson and Governor Claiborne. In January, 1804, he reiterated to Wilkinson and Claiborne that the limits on the east bank of the Mississippi remain fixed by the treaty of Paris and that Spain had peremptorily refused to include Mobile in the transfer [of 1801]. ^{p. 89}

=== Mobile Act ===
In November, 1803, John Randolph had introduced into the House of Representatives a bill to carry into effect the laws of the United States within its new acquisition. On Feb. 24, 1804, President Jefferson signed it. Its fourth and eleventh sections gave it its popular name, "The Mobile Act."

With regard to watersheds that discharge their waters to the Gulf of Mexico, the act authorized the president (1) to annex to the Mississippi revenue district all such navigable waters wholly within the United States east of the Mississippi River and (2) to place all such waters to the east of the Pascagoula River into a separate revenue district and to designate suitable ports of entry and delivery. "These two sections placed a full legislative interpretation on the theories of Livingston, Monroe and Jefferson, and there remained only the open or tacit acquiescence of Spain to make good the title of the United States as far as the Perdido.

"In a violent personal interview which [the Spanish minister to the U.S.,] Marqués de Casa Yrujo held with him, Madison speedily learned that Spain would by no means consent to this interpretation. The incensed Spaniard demanded the annulment of these offending sections, and gave at great length the Spanish interpretation of the obscure territorial clauses. … As neither he nor Jefferson had demanded possession of the territory at the time Louisiana was transferred, the situation was an awkward one for both of them. … As Madison rendered him no adequate explanation of the administration's course, Yrujo withdrew from Washington in anger.

"The president then cleared the situation by his proclamation of May 30, 1804," in which he placed all of the waterways and shores mentioned in the Mobile Act, lying within the boundaries of the United States, in a separate revenue district, with Fort Stoddert as its port of entry and delivery. Fort Stoddert had been built in 1799 in the Mississippi Territory to the north of Mobile and West Florida. Thus Jefferson virtually annulled the act. According to the British minister to Washington, this course was "perfectly satisfactory" to Casa Yrujo, who nevertheless "continued to harp upon it as a characteristic example of American duplicity." ^{pp. 97–100}

Jefferson "had evidently permitted Congress to pass the act in order to test Spanish resistance to [the U.S.] claim. When this proved unexpectedly strong, he wavered … and, by implication, threw upon Randolph the major part of the blame for the unfortunate legislation." The testy Ways and Means Committee chairman did not forget the affront. ^{p. 100}

=== Failure of Monroe's special mission ===
In 1804, Madison assigned a special mission to Monroe, which had as one of the administration's objects to "perfect its title to West Florida," with the right to the Perdido being a sine qua non. Cox states, "With this statement we may conclude the American position in regard to West Florida. Political, commercial, and strategic motives, as well as personal views, led Livingston, Monroe, Madison, and Jefferson to insist upon including it in the Louisiana Purchase. West Florida was necessary for the defence of New Orleans and the navigation of the Mobile. It had been desired for more than twenty years. Its acquisition formed the main purpose of Monroe's special mission." ^{pp. 100–101}

Monroe "sought, but in vain, the influence of the French government in favor of [the U.S.] construction of the treaty, and [also] to help in the acquisition of territory east of the Perdido River." ^{pp. 288–291} In response to the Americans' appeal as well as that of Spain, Napoleon sent word in the late summer of 1804 to the American government "that the eastern limit of Louisiana was undoubtedly the Mississippi, the Iberville and the lakes, as laid down in the treaty of 1762; and that the double cession since afforded no basis for a more extensive claim." ^{pp. 109–110}

In October, 1804, Monroe reached Paris from London on his way to Madrid. "Monroe desired to remind Talleyrand [in a letter] of Napoleon's promise the year before to assist the United States in procuring the Floridas." After Monroe left for Madrid, Napoleon "directed Talleyrand to declare the American claim to West Florida absolutely unfounded and to express a sarcastic interest in the outcome of so unusual a negotiation." Talleyrand's declaration on November 8, 1804 (see above), "in connection with other previous statements did much to insure the failure of his mission." ^{pp. 113–116}

"In January, 1805, Turreau and Casa Yrujo, [the French and Spanish ministers to Washington,] in an embarrassing interview with Madison, informed him that their governments had come to the joint conclusion that the American claims to West Florida were untenable…. [Turreau] even quoted the Treaty of 1762 as the determining factor in the territorial dispute. When Madison referred to maps that showed the Perdido as the eastern limit of Louisiana, Turreau pointed out that the same maps included Tennessee and Kentucky within that province. … Madison little relished this reference." ^{pp. 116–117}

"Warned by the reports from abroad, the president now expected his envoys to break off the hopeless negotiations and merely attempt to secure the privilege of navigating the Mobile. Madison was ready to abandon the American claim to West Florida altogether." ^{p. 118}

In Madrid on May 12, 1805, Monroe and the American envoy Charles Pinckney submitted to Spain "the ultimate conditions on which they were authorized to adjust the points depending between the two governments. … The propositions were absolutely rejected, and Mr. Monroe considering the negotiation concluded, asked and obtained his passports," acknowledging "the utter failure of the mission in all its objects." ^{p. 293}

=== Further notes ===
Chambers observes that, in a letter written by Jefferson in 1809 after he had left office, Madison's claim to West Florida did not impress the mind of the former president, finding Jefferson's words to be a virtual acknowledgement that the acquisition of the Floridas was a matter for future consideration, and that neither one of the Floridas had come into possession of the United States by the Louisiana Purchase. ^{pp. 46–47}

Chambers also explains how, "when the United States purchased Louisiana, it acquired a vitiated title, which, if Spain had been at the zenith of her power, would never have been made good." ^{p 26} Chambers concludes, "But for the successful revolt of the West Floridians in 1810, … the title to West Florida would have been an open question until 1819. As it was, the treaty making cession of Florida to the United States specified East and West Florida." ^{p. 46}

In 1813, the United States seized the land between the East Pearl River and the Perdido River. Although James Wilkinson was being paid about $4000 a year by the Spanish government, he nonetheless led the United States Army unit that carried out this seizure, the only permanent territorial acquisition during the War of 1812. On September 12-15, 1814, the Royal Navy, the Royal Marines, and Muscogees, attacked Mobile Point in the First Battle of Fort Bowyer; HMS Hermes ran aground during the unsuccessful bombardment and was burned by the British. On February 8, 1815, in the Second Battle of Fort Bowyer, the Royal Navy landed soldiers who successfully set up cannons, howitzers, mortars, and Congreve rocket launchers, and the fort was surrendered on February 12. However, on February 13, HMS Brazen arrived, with news of the Treaty of Ghent.

On July 17, 1821, Colonel José María Callava, the Spanish governor of West Florida, formally delivered West Florida to United States General Andrew Jackson.
