= Mobile Act =

1804 law regarding land in Louisiana and West Florida

The Colony of West Florida was ceded to Spain from Great Britain in 1781, and was contested by the United States in the early 19th century

The Mobile Act was the popular name of a bill signed into law in early 1804 by United States President Thomas Jefferson. The law defined revenue boundaries for the newly acquired territories that the United States had gained from its purchase of La Louisiane from France. The act anticipated that Mobile would be designated as a port of entry for a new revenue district. Mobile was, however, at the time a part of the Spanish province of West Florida.

== Background ==
Following the Louisiana Purchase from France, the U.S. had quickly established the Louisiana and Orleans Territories. President Jefferson displayed an active interest in the area to the east of New Orleans, the Spanish province of West Florida (which included the "Florida Parishes" and the area surrounding the mouth of the Mobile River in today's state of Alabama). The U.S. claimed that the purchase was based on the former boundaries of French Louisiana as they existed in 1762, which included all the lands west of the Perdido River (today the boundary between Alabama and Florida). Spain, however, disagreed with this position because the purchase treaty specified the boundaries of Louisiana as France possessed it and as Spain received it,^{p. 48} which occurred in 1769 when Spain took title to and possession of Louisiana, during the time that West Florida was a British colony. Contesting and strongly objecting to the U.S. position, Spain, with France's backing, continued to exercise control over its West Florida province.^{p. 109–118}

== The act ==
In November, 1803, John Randolph, chairman of the Ways and Means Committee, introduced into the House of Representatives a bill to carry into effect the laws of the United States within its new acquisition. On February 24, 1804, President Jefferson signed it into law. Its fourth and eleventh sections gave it its popular name, the Mobile Act. The act defined revenue boundaries for the newly acquired territories and gave Jefferson the opportunity to apply its provisions to a new district that would include Mobile, which was part of Spanish West Florida.

With regard to watersheds that discharge their waters to the Gulf of Mexico, the act authorized the president (1) to annex to the Mississippi revenue district all such navigable waters wholly within the United States east of the Mississippi River and (2) to place all such waters to the east of the Pascagoula River into a separate revenue district and to designate suitable ports of entry and delivery. "These two sections placed a full legislative interpretation on the theories of Livingston, Monroe and Jefferson, and there remained only the open or tacit acquiescence of Spain to make good the title of the United States as far as the Perdido.

"In a violent personal interview which [the Spanish minister to the U.S.,] Marqués de Casa Yrujo held with him, Madison speedily learned that Spain would by no means consent to this interpretation. The incensed Spaniard demanded the annulment of these offending sections, and gave at great length the Spanish interpretation of the obscure territorial clauses. … As neither he nor Jefferson had demanded possession of the territory at the time Louisiana was transferred, the situation was an awkward one for both of them. … As Madison rendered him no adequate explanation of the administration's course, Yrujo withdrew from Washington in anger.

"The president then cleared the situation by his proclamation of May 30, 1804," in which he placed all of the waterways and shores mentioned in the Mobile Act, lying within the boundaries of the United States, in a separate revenue district, with Fort Stoddert as its port of entry and delivery. Fort Stoddert had been built in 1799 in the Mississippi Territory to the north of Mobile and West Florida. Thus Jefferson virtually annulled the act. According to the British minister to Washington, this course was "perfectly satisfactory" to Casa Yrujo, who nevertheless "continued to harp upon it as a characteristic example of American duplicity." ^{pp. 97–100}

Jefferson "had evidently permitted Congress to pass the act in order to test Spanish resistance to [the U.S.] claim. When this proved unexpectedly strong, he wavered … and, by implication, threw upon Randolph the major part of the blame for the unfortunate legislation." The testy Ways and Means Committee chairman did not forget the affront. ^{p. 100}

[S]hould it end in our getting the navigation of the Mobile only we must make our protestation to Spain that we reserve our right which neither time nor silence is to lessen & shall assert it when circumstances call for it –Letter from Thos. Jefferson to Jms. Madison; April 1, 1805

== Results ==
When Napoleon gave no support to the American border claims, Jefferson did not have the power to contest the situation and did not press the issue, letting it lie for the time being. In the following years the U.S. negotiated for trade passage rights through the port of Mobile using diplomatic channels. Spain remained the dominant government and military power in the area for several years. Then, following a revolt resulting in the short-lived Republic of West Florida, the U.S. occupied and forcibly annexed the Florida Parishes in 1810.

Two years later, during the War of 1812, General James Wilkinson occupied the remainder of Spanish West Florida, including Mobile. From 1813 on there was a continual American presence in the city. The U.S. formally purchased the lands through the 1819 Adams–Onís Treaty with Spain, taking legal possession of the entire Florida Territory on July 17, 1821.

== See also ==
- West Florida Controversy
