= Natchez District =

Region colonized by the British in modern Mississippi, USA

Coordinates: 31°30′56″N 91°10′11″W

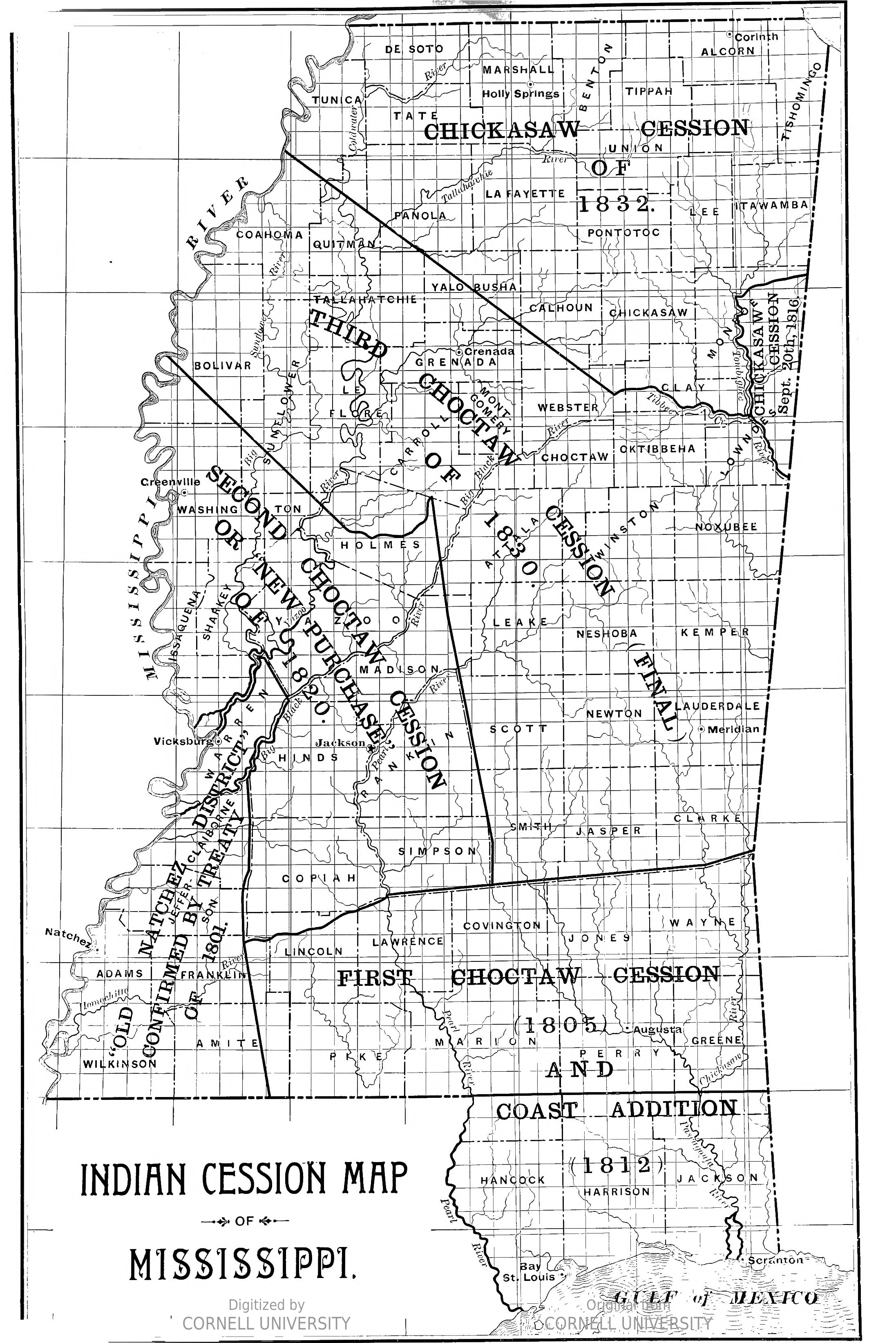
1891 map showing Indian land cessions resulting in the current state of Mississippi

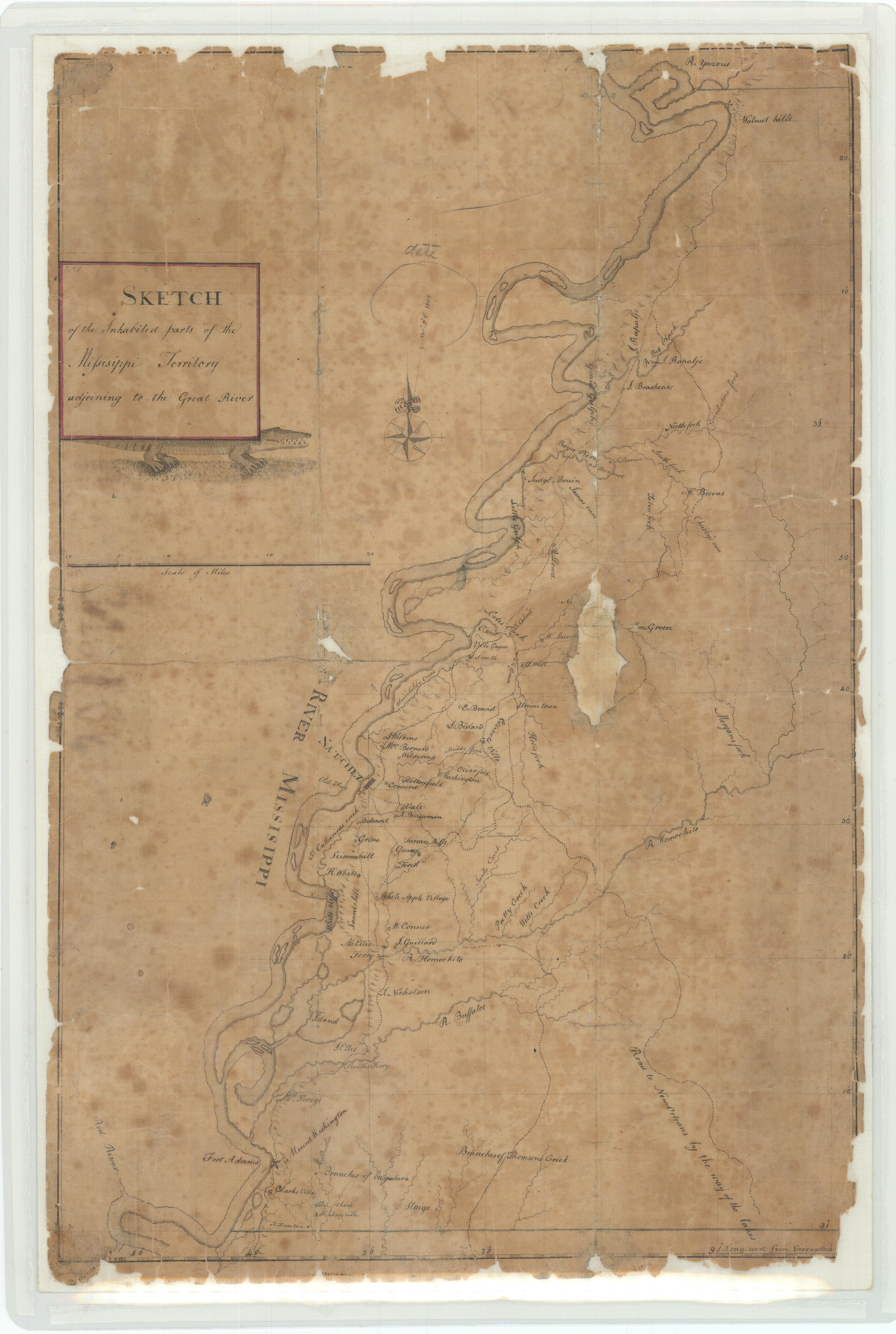
"Sketch of the Inhabited Parts of the Mississippi Territory Adjoining to the Great River," November 9, 1802

Map of Mississippi showing the general location of the Natchez District

The Natchez District was one of two areas established in the Kingdom of Great Britain's West Florida colony during the 1770s – the other being the Tombigbee District. The first English-speaking settlers in the district came primarily from other parts of British America. The district was defined as the area east of the Mississippi River, from Bayou Sara in the south (presently St. Francisville, Louisiana) to Bayou Pierre in the north (presently Port Gibson, Mississippi).

It became a center of wealth in the antebellum years, serving as a major center of the domestic slave trade and cotton commerce and as the center of the cotton plantation economy in the Old Southwest. Today, this area corresponds roughly with and includes most of the lands south of Interstate 20 and west of Interstate 55 in the state of Mississippi, in the southwest corner of the state.

After the United States made the Louisiana Purchase in 1803 of large territories formerly controlled by France west of the Mississippi River, the low-lying delta area on the west side of the river became considered part of the Natchez District. Several parishes were developed for large-scale cotton plantation agriculture here in the antebellum era, unlike southern Louisiana, where sugar cane was the dominant commodity crop. The Louisiana Natchez District included the parishes of Carroll (split between East Carroll and West Carroll in 1877), Concordia, Madison and Tensas.

== History ==
=== Origins ===
The region was the ancestral homeland of the Natchez people and other Indigenous nations before Europeans began colonizing the area.

Before its development in the late 18th century, this area had been known to Europeans for many years, primarily by French explorers and colonists. The French explorer Pierre Le Moyne d'Iberville had passed through the area in 1699 and had christened both the Amité and the Tangipahoa rivers. In the early 18th century, French colonists from Louisiana expanded plantation agriculture into the region using enslaved African labor. Tobacco became the region's first major plantation crop.

In 1774, Great Britain enlarged the boundaries of the West Florida colony—established in 1763 from territory along the northern Gulf of Mexico coast taken from France and Spain following the French and Indian War (the Seven Years' War)—from the 31st parallel north to 32° 22′ north. By 1776, a substantial population of English-speaking planters had settled there. The lands nearest the Mississippi River were developed first for plantation agriculture, as they had important transportation access via the river. Later, as a river port tied to cotton production and the slave trade, it became one of the wealthiest regions in the antebellum South.

At the end of the American Revolutionary War, Great Britain ceded West Florida to Spain as part of the 1783 Treaty of Paris. When this transaction was made, however, West Florida's boundaries, which had changed while under British sovereignty, were not specified. As a result of this omission, control of the region was claimed by both Spain and the United States; resulting in a dispute commonly referred to as the West Florida Controversy. Spain claimed sovereignty over the region south of the boundary established by the British for West Florida in 1774. The U.S. claimed that Spain had regained only the territory transferred to Great Britain in 1763 – that laying south of the 31st parallel. In 1784, the Spanish closed New Orleans and the Mississippi River Delta, which they controlled, to American goods coming down the Mississippi.

After several years of negotiations, Spain and the United States signed a treaty of friendship on October 27, 1795. Commonly called Pinckney's Treaty, the agreement defined the border between the United States and Spanish Florida, and guaranteed the United States navigation rights on the Mississippi River, and the right to transfer goods without paying cargo fees (right of deposit) when they transferred goods from one ship to another at the Port of New Orleans. Nine months later, on August 3, 1796, the U.S. officially took possession of the region. Then, on April 7, 1798, the United States Congress established the Mississippi Territory (comprising both the Natchez and Tombigbee districts), with Natchez as its first capital.

=== Cotton boom ===
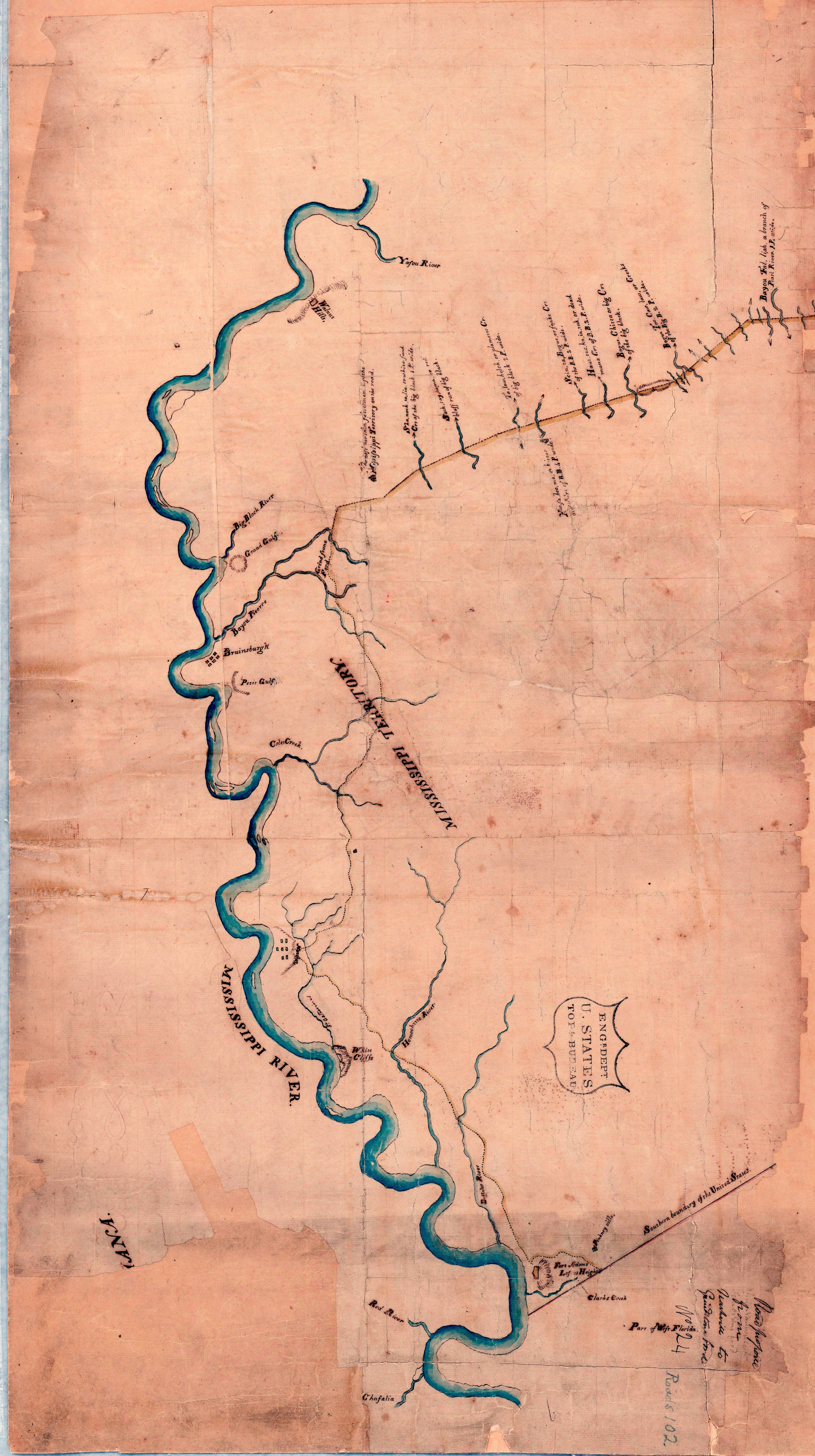
Settlements and landmarks along the Mississippi River in the Natchez District on a survey of the Natchez Trace consequent to the 1801 Treaty of Fort Adams, recorded as "the highway from the Grindstone Ford of Bayou Pierre to Nashville." Settlements listed include Walnut Hills (later Vicksburg), Grand Gulf, Petit Gulf (later Rodney), Bruinsburg, Grindstone Ford, Natchez, White Cliffs, Fort Adams, and Pinckneyville. Natchez and Port Gibson were the biggest towns in Mississippi at statehood in 1817; Vicksburg came into its own as a rival to Natchez in the 1830s. (NAID 102279464)

Eli Whitney's development of the cotton gin in the late 18th century contributed to the growth of the area and the Deep South as a whole by making mechanized processing of short-staple cotton profitable. This type of cotton was better suited to the upland areas of the Deep South. Planters in the Natchez District became very wealthy by converting their tobacco plantations to cotton, for which there was a large market between 1785 and 1800. The rich loess soils proved very fertile for cotton cultivation. The planters developed new, more productive strains of cotton, improved cotton gins, and developed a large-scale system dependent upon both machinery and the forced labor of large numbers of enslaved people.

Their model was expanded in the antebellum South, creating such a demand for enslaved people that more than one million enslaved people were forcibly relocated from the Upper South through the domestic slave trade. They were brought overland, by riverboat, and by ocean-going ships to New Orleans. This forced migration violently separated families and transplanted a large new African-descended population (with also European and Native American ancestry among many) to the area. The Deep South developed as a strong center of African-American culture.

Many slaveholding cotton planters became so extraordinarily wealthy that they acquired thousands of acres and enslaved hundreds of African Americans to work on their plantations. They constructed elaborate mansions in and around the town of Natchez, and they hired overseers to manage their plantations in the countryside. Stephen Duncan (1787–1867) of Mississippi was reported to have enslaved more than 1,000 people, making him one of the wealthiest slaveholding cotton planters of his era.

In 1806, an improved Mexican variety of cotton made the commodity crop even more profitable. The Mexican variety was crossed with the older black-seeded species to make improved varieties that made the state of Mississippi famous. The most noted cotton varieties (Belle Creole, Jethro, Parker, and Petit Gulf) were bred in Mississippi.

In 1803, the United States made the Louisiana Purchase, acquiring vast territories west of the Mississippi River. The low-lying delta area west of the river, across from Natchez, was also informally considered part of the Natchez District. Unlike southern Louisiana, which was devoted to sugar cane cultivation, this area was developed for cotton plantations. When organized, the parishes included Carroll Parish, Louisiana (split between East Carroll and West Carroll in 1877), Concordia, Madison, and Tensas. Following the American Civil War, African Americans here joined the Republican Party, as did others in the state. Black political participation was violently suppressed after Reconstruction. For example, white officials and citizens systematically disenfranchised Black voters in East Carroll Parish, which was majority black, until a federal judge registered some in 1962.

As of 1830, the seven counties of the Natchez District "constituted only 34 percent" of Mississippi's White population but "possessed 65 percent of the slaves, paid 69 percent of the taxes, and owned 78 percent of the assessed property value of the state."

The cotton boom of the early 19th century spread across the South from two primary cultural hearths: coastal South Carolina and the Natchez District. Slavery-dependent cotton plantations expanded throughout the Southeast. In the Carolinas, Georgia, and Alabama, the cotton-growing areas became known as the Black Belt. From Natchez, the cotton plantation system spread north into the Mississippi embayment region, and west along the rivers of Louisiana, Arkansas, and Texas. In the antebellum years, nearly all plantations were developed with frontage on a river, for transportation.

The U.S. government recognized the strategic importance of Natchez early on. As the city developed as a primary cotton port, Congress financed the building and improvement of roads leading to it. The U.S. Army widened the Natchez Trace, which connected the region to Nashville, Tennessee, to accommodate wagons. The road was placed under the oversight of the Postmaster General of the United States, making it one of the earliest national highways.

== See also ==
- West Florida
- Battle of Baton Rouge (1779)
- Fort Rosalie
- History of Mississippi
- Natchez, Mississippi slave market

== Sources ==
- Miles, Edwin Arthur (1970) [1960]. Jacksonian Democracy in Mississippi. The American Scene: Comments and Commentators. New York City: De Capo Press. LCCN 78107415. SBN 306-71884-7.
