= Joshua Toulmin =

English theologian (1740-1815)

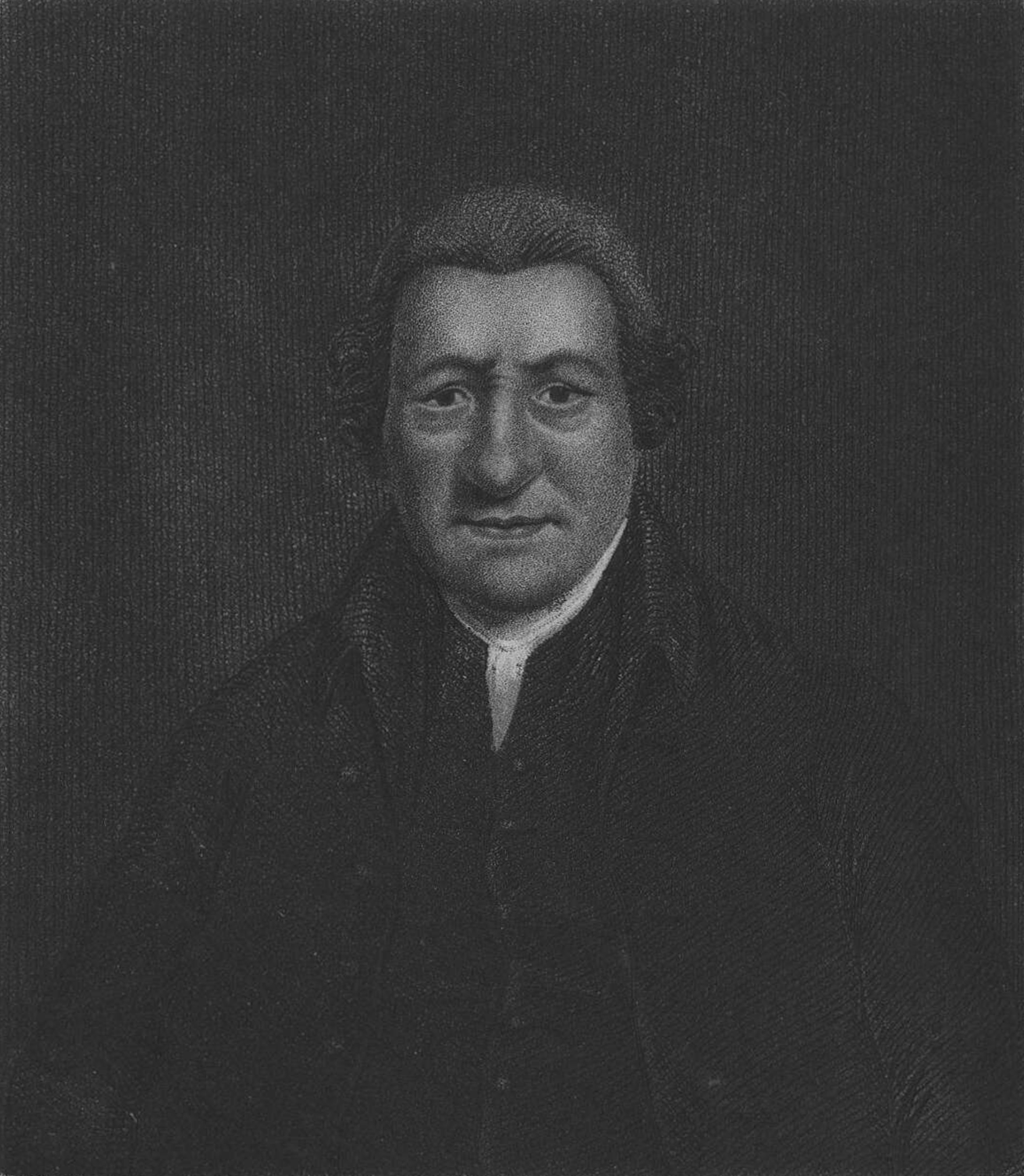
- 1810 portrait of Joshua Toulmin
- Born: 30 April 1740; London, England
- Died: 23 July 1815 (aged 75); Birmingham, England
- Education: Brown University, Harvard University
- Occupation: Dissenting Minister
- Spouse: Jane Smith

Joshua Toulmin (11 May [O.S. 30 April] 1740 – 23 July 1815) of Taunton, England was a noted theologian and a serial Dissenting minister of Presbyterian (1761–1764), Baptist (1765–1803), and then Unitarian (1804–1815) congregations. Toulmin's sympathy for both the American (1775–1783) and French (1787–1799) revolutions led the Englishman to be associated with the United States and gained the prolific historian the reputation of a religious radical.

== Biography ==
=== Early life ===
Toulmin was born in London, England on 30 April 1740 to Caleb Toulmin and Mary Skinner, daughter of Thomas Skinner. At age eight, on 11 November 1748, Toulmin was admitted to St. Paul's School in London. As he grew, so did his nonconformist views. Because Toulmin refused to conform to the Church of England, he next was educated under David Jennings at the dissenting academy in Wellclose Square, of the Coward Trust, located on The Highway in the East End of London.

=== The Serial Dissenting Minister ===
By 1761 at age twenty-one, the Dissenting Academy ordained Toulmin as a Dissenting minister. On graduating from Wellclose Square Dissenting Academy, now Reverend (Rev.) Toulmin became the Presbyterian minister of his first congregation at Colyton, a civil parish located within east Devonshire. Although the Colyton congregation was Presbyterian, Toulmin eventually became a convert to the opinions of the Baptists. Now an antipaedobaptist, Toulmin began to advocate adult baptism and to theologically oppose infant baptism.

==== Marriage and descendants ====
At the age of twenty-four, Toulmin married Jane Smith. The Toulmins eventually had twelve children, of whom only five survived. Toulmin's theological objections to infant baptism possibly extended to infant registration, as none of his children's births were registered. Their eldest son, Harry Toulmin, went on to become a Unitarian minister and then emigrated to America, where eventually he was forced to resign as President of Transylvania Seminary in Lexington, Kentucky "under disapproval of his Socinian (Unitarian) errors."

Joshua Toulmin Smith was his grandson.

=== From Presbyterian to Baptist minister ===
In 1765, at the age of twenty-five, Toulmin transferred himself to his second congregation at Taunton, in Somersetshire, as a Baptist minister. For the next thirty-nine years, Toulmin lived in Taunton and had charge of the Taunton Baptist congregation at Mary Street Unitarian Chapel, where he also taught school and published most of his sixty-plus works through which he expressed his anti-England sympathy with both the American Revolutionary War (1775–1783) and the French Revolution (1787–1799).

Because Toulmin favored the United States and France, then-enemies of England, he "could seldom pass through the streets without insult, while to keep company with him was deemed contagious and impossible." For example, during the French Revolution, an effigy of Thomas Paine was burned before Toulmin's door and his windows were broken.

In 1769, Toulmin received an Artium Magister (A.M.) degree from the recently founded College in the English Colony of Rhode Island and Providence Plantations (the former name for Brown University) in Providence, Rhode Island.

Toulmin's 1778 letter to Robinson

Page 1

Page 2

Page 3

Page 4

In 1778, Toulmin wrote to Rev. Robert Robinson of Cambridge requesting copies of Robinson's lectures on nonconformity to use as a guide for Toulmin's own lectures. In the letter (see above), Toulmin expresses his opinion about baptism.

In 1790, Toulmin carried out a census of Taunton and "counted nearly five and a half thousand people living within the area ringed by the turnpike gates." He followed up this census with his book, The History of Taunton in the County of Somerset, which was published in 1791 while he held the title schoolmaster.

In 1794, Toulmin received his Doctor of Divinity (D.D.) diploma from Harvard University in the United States and was accorded the title Doctor.

In 1798, Toulmin's daughter Jane drowned. In the face of this hardship and his longtime political persecutions, he stood strong. For example, during his ministry in Taunton at the Mary Street Unitarian Chapel, poet Samuel Taylor Coleridge wrote, in a 1798 letter to John Prior Estlin, "I walked into Taunton (eleven miles) and back again, and performed the divine services for Dr. Toulmin. I suppose you must have heard that his daughter, (Jane, on 15 April 1798) in a melancholy derangement, suffered herself to be swallowed up by the tide on the sea-coast between Sidmouth and Bere (sic. Beer). These events cut cruelly into the hearts of old men: but the good Dr. Toulmin bears it like the true practical Christian, — there is indeed a tear in his eye, but that eye is lifted up to the Heavenly Father."

=== From Baptist to Unitarian minister ===
Somewhere along the way, Toulmin's beliefs changed again from Baptist to Unitarian. In January 1804, at age sixty-four, Toulmin moved to Birmingham, England and accepted a position as one of the pastors of the Birmingham Unitarian congregation, formerly presided over by the co-discover of oxygen, Joseph Priestley. Between 1809 and 1811, Toulmin lived in Birmingham on Paradise Row, and he died there on 23 July 1815, at the age of seventy-five.

Toulmin initially was buried in the Old Meeting graveyard in Birmingham. His tombstone was moved to the borough cemetery at Witton in 1886. At the time of his death, Toulmin had a plan for an annuitant society for the benefit of widows. However, this society plan came to grief because it was based on London death rates, which differed from those of Birmingham.

== Works ==
Dr. Toulmin was a prolific writer, and is known to have written over sixty publications in the areas of (i) religion and spirituality, history, parenting and families, reference, and nonfiction. He occasionally contributed to the Theological Repository, The Nonconformists' Memorial, The Monthly Magazine, and other periodical publications. Many of his personal letters have survived, and may be seen in Dr Williams's Library in London. In addition, Taunton public library has a copy of his book, "The History of Taunton in the County of Somerset", (published in 1791) and many papers related to him "Joshua Toulmin[*1331] 1740 - 1815"..

=== Published books ===
- Toulmin, Joshua. (1777). Memoirs of the Life, Character, Sentiments and Writings of Faustus Socinus. Hardcover. Publisher: J. Brown, Portable Printing-Press. ASIN B000FVZYBE.
- Toulmin, Joshua. (1800). The name "Lord of Hosts" explained and improved: In a sermon preached in the chapels of Princes Street, Westminster, on 16 February, and Essex Street, Strand, on 23 February 1800. 22 pages. Publisher: Printed by Stower & Hare. Language: English. ASIN B0008BGAFK.
- Toulmin, Joshua. (1801). The practical efficacy of the Unitarian doctrine: Considered in a series of letters to the Rev. Andrew Fuller : occasioned by his publication entitled ...of an essay on the grounds of love to Christ. 177 pages. Publisher: Sold by J. Johnson; 2d ed., enl edition. Language: English. ASIN B00087DT8K.
- Toulmin, Joshua. (1802). The prospect of future, universal peace: Considered in a sermon preached in the Baptist Chapel in Taunton, in the county of Somerset : on 1 June, ...day of national thanksgiving for the peace. 26 pages. Publisher: Printed by C. Stower. Language: English. ASIN B0008BGADC.
- Toulmin, Joshua. (1804). A biographical tribute to the memory of the Rev. Joseph Priestley, L.L.D.F.R.S: In an address to the congregation of Protestant Dissenters at the New Meeting... 22 April 1804, on occasion of his death. 40 pages. Publisher: Printed by James Belcher. Language: English. ASIN B0008ANSUQ
- Toulmin, Joshua. (1804). The aim of the apostle Paul's ministry: Considered in a sermon preached at the New Meeting in Birmingham, 8 January 1804, on entering upon the office of one of the pastors in that congregation. 30 pages. Publisher: J. Belcher. Language: English. ASIN B0008B9034
- Toulmin, Joshua. (1807). The meaning which the word mystery bears in the New Testament: Considered and applied, in a sermon, preached to an assembly of ministers, on the Thursday morning's lecture, at Exeter, 4 May 1791. 23 pages. Publisher: J. Belcher & Son; 3rd ed edition. Language: English. ASIN B0008B900M
- Toulmin, Joshua. (1808). A memoir of Job, an African high priest. 196 pages. Language: English. ASIN B0008B0LY6.
- Toulmin, Joshua. (1811). Four discourses on the nature, design, uses and history of the ordinance of baptism: With a preface containing some strictures on Dr. Priestley's "Letter... Frend's "Letters to the Bishop of Lincoln". 93 pages. Publisher: C. Stower. Language: English. ASIN B0008BAHN6.
- Toulmin, Joshua. (1813). The reciprocal duties of ministers and people, illustrated and enforced: A sermon delivered at Dudley in Worcestershire on Whit-Tuesday, 8 June 1813, ...and members of neighbouring congregations. 22 pages. Publisher: Printed and published by Orton and Hawkes Smith, also sold by J. Belcher and Son and Sherwood, Neely and Jones. Language: English. ASIN B0008BBAPK.
- Toulmin, Joshua. (1814). A free and serious address to the Christian laity, especially such as embracing Unitarian sentiments conform to Trinitarian worship: To which if prefixed... or the Church of England and of dissenters. 111 pages. Publisher: Printed and sold by J. Belcher; 2nd ed edition (1814). Language: English. ASIN B0008C4ALU.
- Toulmin, Joshua. (1814). An historical view of the state of the Protestant dissenters in England,: And of the progress of free enquiry and religious liberty, from the revolution to the accession of Queen Anne. 592 pages. Publisher: Printed by R. Cruttwell and sold by Longman, Hurst, Rees, Orme, and Browne, London (1814). Language: English. ASIN B0006AR1G0.
- Toulmin, Joshua. (1814). Family devotion assisted: Containing forms of morning and evening prayers for a fortnight. 132 pages. Publisher: O. and H. Smith. Language: English. ASIN B0008BACKY.
- Toulmin, Joshua. (1814). The Unitarian doctrine stated and the objections to it obviated, on the ground of Christ's declaration: A sermon preached before the Devon and Cornwall... of virtue by the distribution of books. 35 pages. Publisher: Printed and sold by O. and H. Smith, and by J. Belcher and Son (1814). Language: English. ASIN B0008B40JI.
- Toulmin, Joshua. (1817). A review of the preaching of the Apostles; or, The practical efficacy of the Unitarian doctrine. 59 pages. Publisher: Printed for the Editor by T. Walker (1817). Language: English. ASIN B00089CUFG.
- Toulmin, Joshua. (1818). Posthumous discourses of the very venerable Joshua Toulmin, D.D. 457 pages. Publisher: W. Hawkes Smith (1818). Language: English. ASIN B0008BADPI.
- Toulmin, Joshua. (1822). The history of Taunton, in the county of Somerset. 608 pages. Publisher: Printed for J. Poole; New ed. greatly enlarged edition. Language: English. ASIN B00087CES6.
- Toulmin, Joshua. (1874). The history of Taunton in the county of Somersetshire. 408 pages. Publisher: C.G. Webb. Language: English. ASIN B00087GIFG.
- Toulmin, Joshua. A new edition of Neal's History of the Puritans, with notes and additions.
- Toulmin, Joshua. Dissertations on the Internal Evidences of Christianity.
- Toulmin, Joshua. Memories of the Rev. Samuel Bourne (Toulmin's colleague at Birmingham).
- Toulmin, Joshua. Review of the Life, Character, and Writings of John Biddle, [M.A.].
- Toulmin, Joshua. Sermons addressed to Youth, with a Translation of Isocrates's Oration to Demonicus.
- Toulmin, Joshua. Sermons on Devotional Subjects.

=== Published letters ===
- Toulmin, Joshua. (1778). Letter to Rev. Robert Robinson dated 30 October 1778.
- Toulmin, Joshua. Address to Young Men.
- Toulmin, Joshua. Letters to Dr. John Sturges on the Church Establishment.
- Toulmin, Joshua. Two Letters on the Address of the Dissenting Ministers on Subscription.
