= Mobile District =

District of the Spanish colony of West Florida

Coordinates: 30°42′N 88°39′W

The Mobile District (spanish: Distrito de Mobila) was an administrative division of the Spanish colony of West Florida, which was claimed by the short-lived Republic of West Florida, established on September 23, 1810. Reuben Kemper led a small force in an attempt to capture Mobile from the Spanish on behalf of the new republic, but the expedition ended in failure.

The district was bounded on the north by the 31st parallel, on the south by the Gulf of Mexico, on the east by the Perdido River, and on the west by the Pearl River.

In 1810 the United States, citing the Mobile Act of 1804, justified its annexation of the Baton Rouge District, which had been under the control of the unrecognized Republic of West Florida. At that time, the Mobile District remained under Spanish control. The District, however, was later declared by Congress to be annexed to the United States on May 14, 1812, immediately prior to the start of the War of 1812 with Great Britain, with whom Spain was allied.

Nearly a year later, a U.S. military force arrived in Mobile to formally accept the presiding Spanish commander's surrender. The Mobile District was incorporated into the Mississippi Territory. From that point, Spanish Florida was equivalent in its geography to today's Florida; however, it would be nearly another decade before Spain ceded Florida to the United States.

== Aftermath ==
Today the former Mobile District forms the southernmost sections of two states, Mississippi and Alabama. Amilitary expedition led by Reuben Kemper failed. They remained under Spanish control until 1811 (Mississippi portion) and April 1813 (Alabama portion):

- Jackson County, MS (which included George County before Jackson was split in 1900.)
- Hancock County, MS (which included Pearl River County before Hancock was split in 1900.)
- Harrison County, MS (which included Stone County before Harrison was split in 1900.)
- Mobile County, AL
- Baldwin County, AL

== See also ==
- History of Alabama
- History of Florida
- History of Louisiana
- History of Mississippi
- West Florida Controversy
