= Fort Stoddert =

U.S. colonial fort (1799–1814) in present-day Mount Vernon, Alabama

- Mount Vernon, Alabama in United States
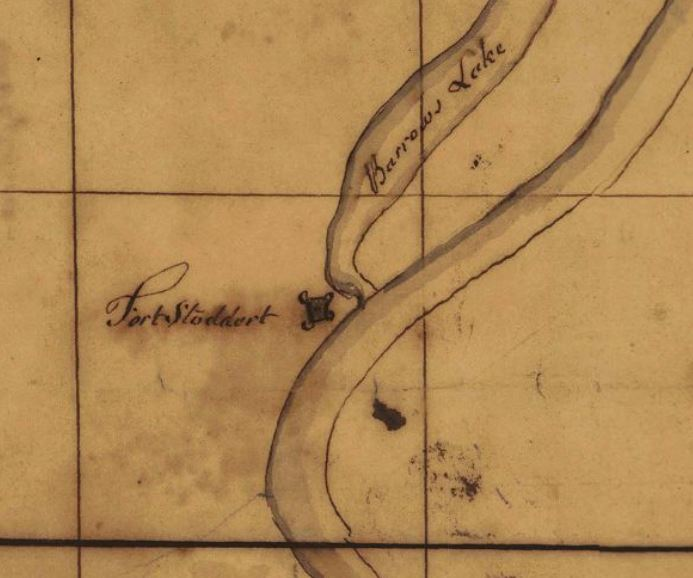
- Rough outline of Fort Stoddert from United States General Land Office survey map

Site information
- Type: Stockade fort
- Owner: Private
- Controlled by: Private
- Open to the public: No

Location
- Location within Alabama Location within the United States
- Coordinates: 31°05′22″N 87°58′03″W

Site history
- Built: 1799
- Built by: United States Army
- In use: 1799–1814
- Battles/wars: Creek War

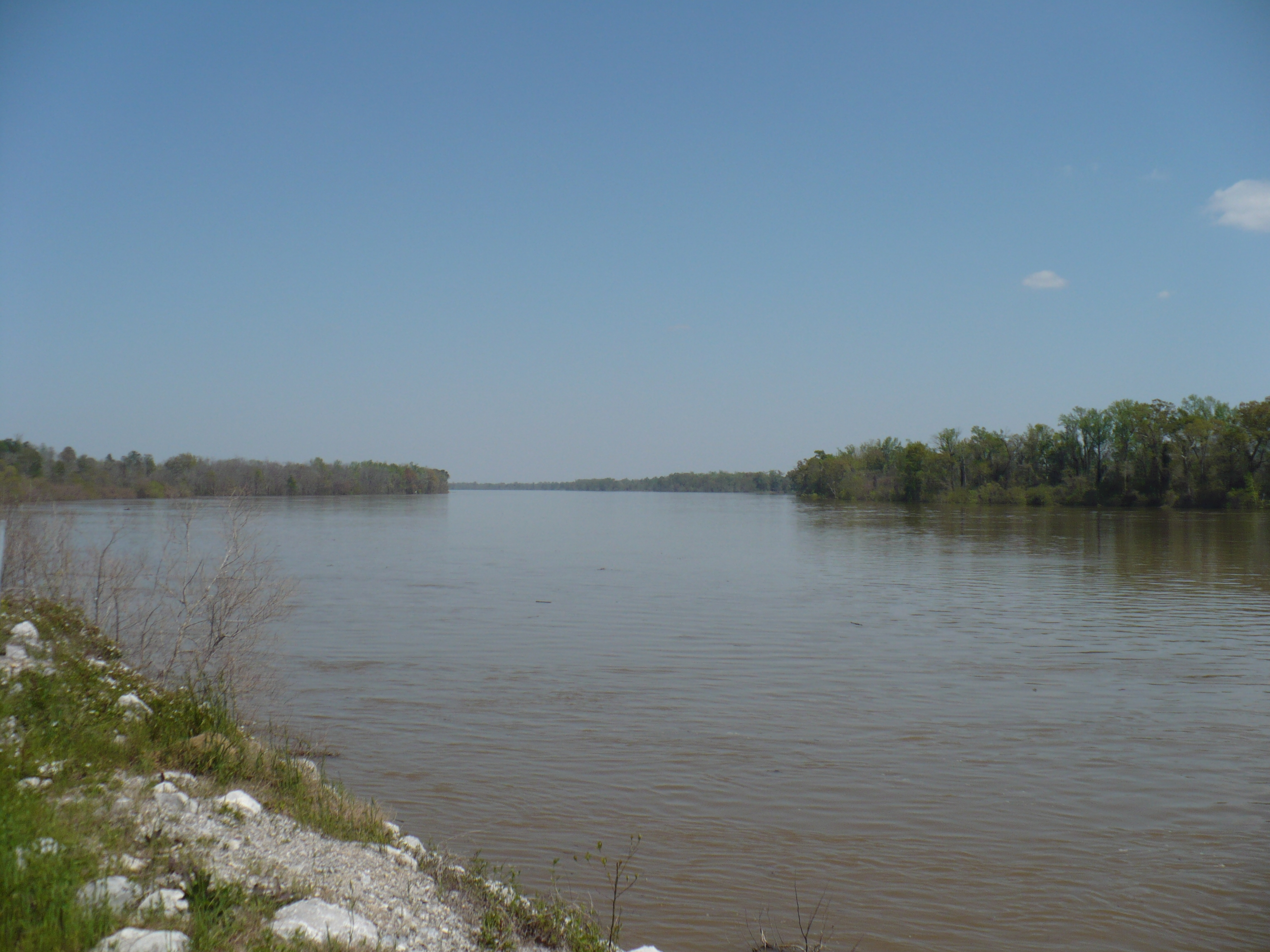
The Mobile River, looking northward from the site of Fort Stoddert.

Fort Stoddert, also known as Fort Stoddard, was a stockade fort in the U.S. Mississippi Territory, in what is today Alabama. It was located on a bluff of the Mobile River, near modern Mount Vernon, close to the confluence of the Tombigbee and Alabama Rivers. This location was just north of what was then the international boundary line between the new United States and Spanish-held West Florida. As a border fort, Fort Stoddert served as the southwestern terminus of the Federal Road which ran through Creek lands to Fort Wilkinson in Georgia.

The fort, built in 1799, was named for Benjamin Stoddert, the secretary to the Continental Board of War during the American Revolution and Secretary of the Navy during the Quasi War. The fort was constructed by troops of the 2nd Infantry Regiment who had marched from Natchez, Mississippi. Fort Stoddert was built by the United States to keep the peace by preventing its own settlers in the Tombigbee District from attacking the Spanish in the Mobile District. One of the two district land offices for the Mississippi Territory operated from Fort Stoddert prior to moving to St. Stephens in 1805. It also served as a port of entry and was the site of a Court of Admiralty. Fort Stoddert was under the command of Captain Bartholomew Schaumburgh from 1799 to 1802, Captain Thomas Swaine from 1802 to 1804, Captain Peter Philip Schuyler from 1804 to 1807, Captain Edmund P. Gaines from 1807 to 1810, and finally Captain Richard Sparks beginning in 1810.

Ephraim Kirby and Harry Toulmin both served as Superior Court Judge of the Tombigbee District of the Mississippi Territory, which was based at Fort Stoddert.

While under the command of Captain Gaines, Aaron Burr was held as a prisoner at the fort after his arrest at McIntosh in 1807 for treason against the United States. In July 1813, General Ferdinand Claiborne brought the Mississippi Militia to Fort Stoddert as part of the Creek War. The 3rd Infantry Regiment was commanded by General Thomas Flournoy to Fort Stoddert following the Fort Mims massacre. A large number of families from the surrounding area sought protection and moved to Fort Stoddert following the Fort Mims massacre. After many of the soldiers stationed at the fort were ordered to other areas, most of the settlers who had sought the protection of Fort Stoddert felt it to be poorly guarded and moved to Mobile. Fort Stoddert served as a supply point prior to the Battle of New Orleans and soldiers from Fort Stoddert were involved in the construction of nearby Fort Montgomery. The site declined rapidly in importance after the capture of Mobile by the United States in 1813 and the establishment of the Mount Vernon Cantonment. By 1814, the site of Fort Stoddert was essentially abandoned.

A post office operated under the name Fort Stoddart from 1804 to 1829. The first newspaper in Alabama, The Mobile Centinel, was published weekly at Fort Stoddert from 1811 to 1813.

Nothing currently remains at the site of Fort Stoddert, but the fort is commemorated in nearby historical markers.
