= John Coburn (Kentucky judge) =

Kentucky pioneer and judge

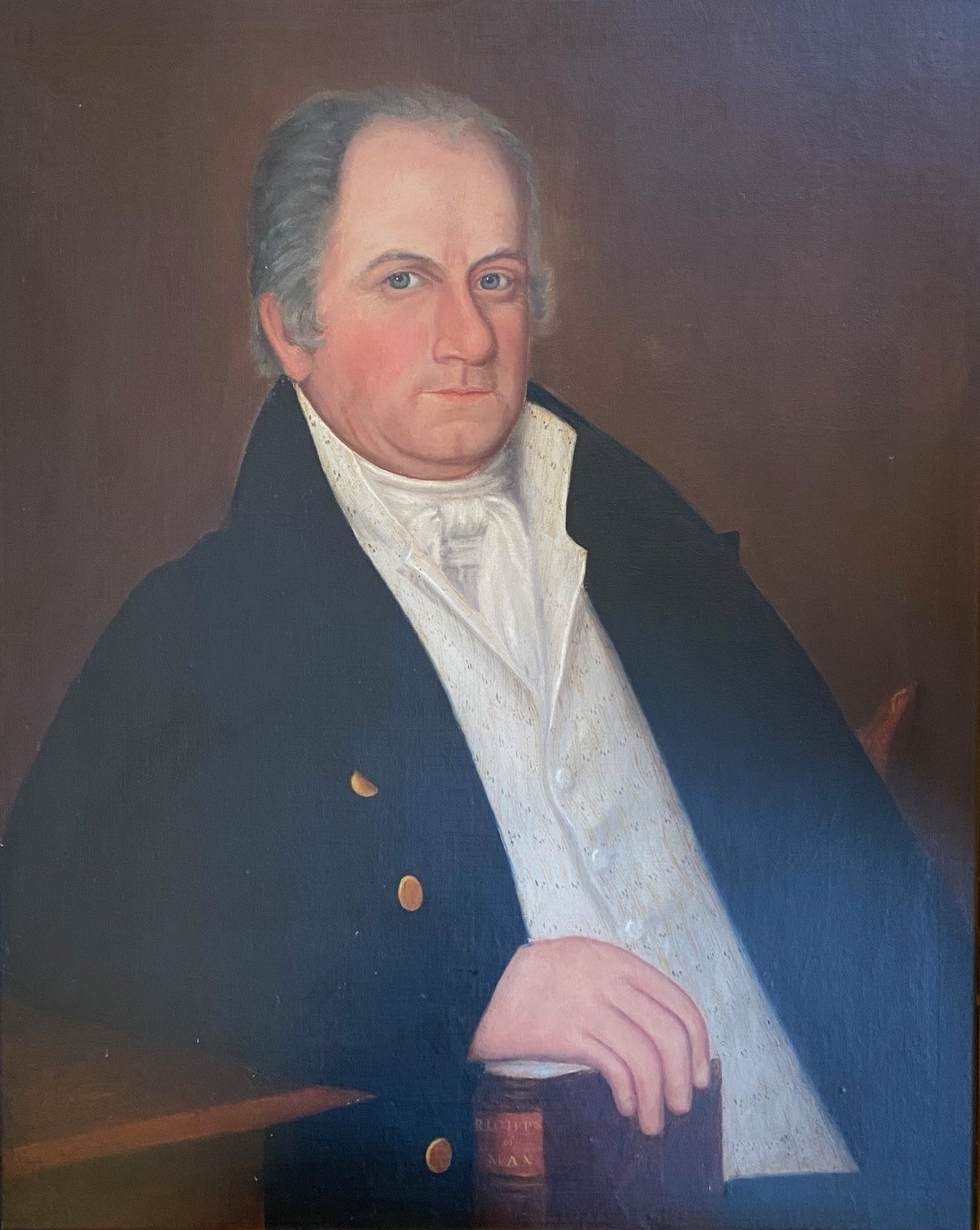
Portrait of John Coburn

John Coburn (August 28, 1762 – February 10, 1823) was a Kentucky pioneer, Circuit Court Judge, and Territory Judge.

== Early life ==
John Coburn was born August 28, 1762, in Philadelphia, Pennsylvania. As a young man, he received a collegiate education, read law under Luther Martin, Attorney General of Maryland, and was admitted to the bar. Martin took special interest in young Coburn, and under Martin's advice, Coburn moved from Philadelphia to Lexington, Kentucky in 1784.

== Career ==
Upon his arrival in Lexington, Kentucky, he found success in mercantile trading, and as his local influence grew, he was elected town trustee. At this time, Kentucky was a Virginia county, and in August 1785, Coburn was appointed to the Danville committee to begin the process of admitting Kentucky as a state to the union. Statehood was granted on June 1, 1792.

In 1786 he married Mary Moss, daughter of a prosperous Virginia planter, who migrated with her family over the Appalachians to Kentucky after the Revolutionary War. Her mother, twice widowed, had married Joseph Royall Farrar of Bryan Station several years after the infamous siege on the fort by the Wyandot, Shawnee, and Lenape warriors led by the British Captain William Caldwell and Simon Girty.

In 1794, Coburn moved his growing family to the town of Washington, Kentucky, the second-largest town, after Lexington, and the county seat for Mason County. He was appointed Circuit Court Judge of Mason County in 1795, a position he held for 10 years.

In Washington, Coburn partnered with Dr. Basil Duke (grandfather of Basil W. Duke, Confederate Brigadier General) and Captain Nathaniel Wilson in land speculation and merchant trading. Coburn and Duke built a house on Green Street, opposite the court house, in which the families occupied separate apartments. Wilson built a house on an adjoining lot, now called the Albert Sidney Johnston House, the birthplace of the Confederate General who died in the Battle of Shiloh.

Wilson died in 1796, and Coburn and Duke continued purchasing large amounts of land in Mason County, the surrounding counties, and across the river in Ohio. In 1801 they laid out the town of Decatur in what would eventually be Brown County, Ohio. They were also appointed to a committee tasked with building Franklin Academy in the town of Washington.

In 1796, he was appointed by the Kentucky Governor, James Garrard, along with Robert Johnson and Buckner Thruston, to join three elected commissioners from Virginia to settle the boundary line between the states of Kentucky and Virginia, and Coburn wrote the final report.

Coburn served in the Kentucky Electoral College for three presidential elections: 1796, John Adams and Thomas Jefferson; 1800, Thomas Jefferson and Aaron Burr; and 1804, Thomas Jefferson and George Clinton.

In August 1798, in response to the Alien and Sedition Acts, Coburn was appointed to a committee requesting the governor of Kentucky call for an early convening of the legislature. The ensuing meetings of the Legislature resulted in the passing of the famous Kentucky Resolutions which were influential in undoing the Federalist Party and bringing about the election of Thomas Jefferson in 1800.

In 1802 Coburn penned a letter to Thomas Jefferson expressing his many years of regret for the situation of the enslaved in the U.S. and a desire that some solution be created for the abolition of slavery. He refers to slavery as an "evil" and the enslaved as "greatly oppressed". He shares his own ideas for a solution, mainly providing free land in the "unappropriated tract of country" northwest of the Ohio, as well as instruction, supervision, and proper schools. In closing, he states if his appeal fails that his letter stands as a record of his warning to fellow citizens of the impending dangers that will arise with inattention to the subject of slavery.

On February 23, 1805, Coburn was appointed Judge of the Territory of Michigan by President Thomas Jefferson, which he declined, but in October of that year, accepted an appointment from Jefferson for Judge of the Territory of Orleans. He resigned that appointment in 1809, and on November 20, 1811, was appointed Judge of the Louisiana Territory by President James Madison.

During the War of 1812, Coburn was appointed military aide to Governor Isaac Shelby and Revenue Collector for the 4th District of Kentucky by President James Madison, and continued in that office for seven years.

About 1805, Coburn unsuccessfully attempted to start a town he called Liberty (later changed to Madison) on 275 acres of land he purchased on the Ohio River about one mile east of Limestone (Maysville). In March 1818, he laid out streets and lots of varying sizes on this property east of Union Street and advertised them for sale as an extension of the town of Maysville. Only a few of Coburn's lots sold prior to his death in 1823, and the remaining 275 acres were divided between his children and their heirs. Today this is referred to as East Maysville and is predominantly residential.

=== Daniel Boone ===
Coburn and Daniel Boone became acquainted in the early 1780s when Daniel was a well known Kentucky Frontiersman and Coburn was a young merchant trader newly arrived from Philadelphia. Although it is unknown where Coburn and Boone first met, Coburn's name is on the Ft. Boonesborough Memorial as he was documented as a visitor to the fort in the original minutes. The two men remained lifelong friends despite Boone's legal difficulties that placed his name as a defendant on Judge Coburn's civil docket.

In 1799 Boone was offered a large tract of land by the Spanish west of the Mississippi River, but four years later the Louisiana Purchase threw these Spanish land grants into question. In the fall of 1809, the federal land commission was reviewing the claims, and Coburn received inside information that the commission was about to rule against Boone. Coburn informed Boone of the impending decision and offered his assistance in writing an appeal to Congress. In December, when the commission formally announced their ruling against Boone's claim, Judge Coburn had already drawn up a petition and presented it to his friends in Washington. In Coburn's appeal to Congress he expressed sentiments that Daniel had spent his life exploring the wilderness and settling the western country at his own risk, opening the road to civilization in the new territories. He claimed Boone's object had always been the defense of the country and to share with others and not for gain of personal wealth. Coburn's appeal eventually persuaded Congress to provide Daniel with land from the public domain in Missouri. Coburn's petition was circulated in national newspapers which led to a resurgence of interest in the life of Daniel Boone.

== Death ==
In June 1807, Coburn sold his ownership in the house on Green Street in Washington to his partner, Dr. Basil Duke. Sometime before 1816, he moved to his 275-acre farm on the Ohio River about one mile east of the town of Maysville, and there he died on February 10, 1823. He is buried in the Maysville Cemetery beside his wife and several children and grandchildren.

Coburn's portrait was donated to the University of Kentucky by his great-great-grandson, Herman Lee Donovan, who was the 4th President of the University of Kentucky, 1941–1956. The portrait is located at the university in the archives of the Margaret I. King Library. His son James's portrait was also donated and is located in the University of Kentucky Art Museum.

== Family ==
John Coburn was the son of Captain James Coburn (also known as Cockburn), a sea captain, and Hannah Bazellee. James and Hannah were married in Philadelphia and were among the early members of the city's Baptist community. Hannah came from a Quaker family that had immigrated to Pennsylvania in 1683.

On August 26, 1786, John married Mary Moss, daughter of Hugh Moss and Virginia "Jennie" Ford. Mary's sister was Keturah Moss Leitch Taylor, the widow of David Leitch and wife of General James Taylor Jr. (founder of Newport, Kentucky). Mary was also the aunt of Brigadier General Bernard Gaines Ferrar and Elizabeth Moss, the second wife of John J. Crittenden, the 17th Governor of Kentucky.

John and Mary Coburn had 13 children:

1. Mary Coburn (1787–1788)
2. Dr. James Wynne Coburn (1789–1850) married 1) Susannah Smith Doniphan and 2) Mary Walton. His first wife was the first cousin of Col. Alexander William Doniphan.
3. John Coburn (1791–1804), died unmarried.
4. Dr. Wilson Coburn (1793–1833) married Anne Wood.
5. America Coburn (1796–1826) married 1) Thomas Chalfont and 2) Milton Taylor.
6. Anne Wilson Coburn (1798–1831) married Gilbert Adams.
7. Virginia Coburn (1800–1858) married Joseph F. Tureman.
8. Mary Ford Coburn (1802–1863) married Dr. William R. Wood.
9. John Coburn (1804–1832) married Ann Chambers.
10. Dr. Henry William Coburn (1807–1829), died unmarried.
11. Frances Thomas Coburn (1810–1840) married Phebe Maria Wood.
12. William Sprigg Coburn (1812–1845) married Mary Goddard.
13. Thomas Coburn (1815–aft. 1844) married Elizabeth Smith, granddaughter of Joseph Alvarez Hortiz, secretary to the last two Spanish Governors of Upper Louisiana, New Spain (Zénon Trudeau and Carlos de Hault de Lassus) and niece of Joseph Marie LeBarge, Sr.
