= Tombigbee District =

Region colonized by the British in modern Alabama, USA

Coordinates: 31.35°N 88.05°W

Map of Alabama showing the general location of the Tombigbee District

The Tombigbee District, also known as the Tombigbee, was one of two areas, the other being the Natchez District, that were the first in what was West Florida to be colonized by British subjects from the Thirteen Colonies and elsewhere. This later became the Mississippi Territory as part of the United States. The district was also the first area to be opened to white settlement in what would become the state of Alabama, outside of the French colonial outpost of Mobile on the Gulf Coast. The Tombigbee and Natchez districts (also originally a French settlement) were the only areas populated by whites in the Mississippi Territory when it was formed by the United States in 1798.

The Tombigbee District was an area mostly on the west side of the Tombigbee River in Alabama; it was first opened to settlement by British colonists under the Treaty of Mobile, negotiated between the British government of West Florida and the Choctaw at a Native American congress held in Mobile in March–April 1765. The British had "acquired" this territory from France in 1763 through the Treaty of Paris, after they defeated France in the Seven Years' War. They also acquired other French territories in North America east of the Mississippi River.

The boundaries of the district were roughly limited to the area within a few miles of the Tombigbee River and included portions of modern extreme southern Clarke County, northernmost Mobile County, and most of Washington County.

== History ==
The boundaries set by the treaty in 1765 were described as starting at Grosse Pointe on Mon Louis Island, then up the western coast of Mobile Bay, then up the Mobile River (then considered part of the "Tombecbee") to the confluence of Alibamont (Alabama) and Tombecbee (Tombigbee) rivers, and afterwards along the western bank of the Alibamont River to the Chickianoce River (probably Reedy Creek near Choctaw Bluff in modern Clarke County, Alabama), and from the confluence of the Chickianoce and Alibamont rivers followed a straight line westward to the confluence of the Bance (Jackson Creek in Clarke County) and Alibamont rivers; from there it followed the western bank of the Bance River until its confluence with the Talltukpe River (Tattilaba Creek); from there it followed a straight line to the Tombecbee River opposite Atchalikpe (Hatchatigbee Bluff); and from Atchalikpe it followed a straight line to the source of the Buckatanne River (Buckatunna Creek in Wayne County, Mississippi) down the Buckatanne River to its confluence with the Pascagoula River, and down the Pascagoula River to a point 36 miles (58 km) from the Gulf of Mexico (thought at the time to correspond with the 31st parallel north); and then by a due west line, as far as the Choctaw Nation have a right to grant. The treaty further stated that "none of his Majesty's white subjects should be permitted to settle on the Tombecbee River to the northward of the rivulet called Centebonck" (Santa Bogue Creek in Washington County, Alabama).

Although the 1765 treaty encompassed all of what is now Mobile County and a portion of southwestern Mississippi, most of those areas had already been settled during the French Colonial period or were not settled until several decades later in the 19th century. Significant settlement in the Tombigbee River area did not began until the time of the American Revolution, when Loyalists began to arrive in an attempt to escape persecution by Patriots. One of the earliest of these was Thomas Bassett, who reached the Tombigbee settlements in 1772 and received a land grant on the Tombigbee, southeast of modern Leroy, Alabama, from the Crown in 1776 and another at McIntosh Bluff. He was killed in an attack by Native Americans in 1780.

The British held West Florida until 1779–81, late in the American Revolutionary War, when it was captured by Spanish forces under the command of Bernardo de Gálvez. It formally became a Spanish possession with the 1783 Treaty of Paris, which also ended the American Revolution. This caused a boundary dispute between the United States (US) and Spain, with the U.S. claiming that the boundary between its territory and West Florida was at the 31st parallel north and Spain claiming it at 32 degrees 28 minutes of north latitude. Spain held the Tombigbee settlements until the Pinckney's Treaty in 1795, in which they agreed to the boundary at the 31st parallel north in return for other concessions by the US. It was ratified in the United States Senate on March 7, 1796, and by Spain on April 25, 1796, being proclaimed on August 3, 1796. The treaty stipulated that both countries would participate in a joint expedition to mark the agreed-upon boundary; President George Washington selected Andrew Ellicott as commissioner. The survey was completed in early 1800, although American settlers had already been pouring into the area since the proclamation of the treaty.

Continuously plagued with attacks by hostile Native Americans who resisted the encroachment on their territory, the combined free and slave population of the Tombigbee District, a part of the Mississippi Territory since 1798, was approximately 1,250 people in 1800. The primary town in the district was St. Stephens, begun by the Spanish with the construction of Fort San Esteban in 1789.

On June 4, 1800, the Tombigbee District became the central core of the newly created Washington County, Mississippi Territory. Washington County's original boundaries stretched 300 miles (480 km) east to west and 88 miles (142 km) north to south. The roughly 26,400 square miles (68,000 km^{2}) of the county were later divided to create 16 counties in Mississippi and 29 counties in Alabama.

Despite the great size of Washington County, the Tombigbee District remained the area of primary settlement. Tensions remained high between the American settlers and the Spanish in the Mobile District, in addition to the nearly constant threat of attack from hostile Muscogee tribes. Also, the United States had found it necessary to build Fort Stoddert in 1799 to prevent its own people from taking matters into their own hands and attacking the Spanish. Prior to the War of 1812 and Creek War, the Spaniards in Mobile had allowed British merchants to sell arms and supplies to the Native Americans to harass the American settlers in the Tombigbee District. Using this as a justification, the United States annexed the Mobile District into the Mississippi Territory in 1812. The city of Mobile remained in Spanish hands until General James Wilkinson took a force of American troops from New Orleans to capture it in April 1813.

The so-called "Tombigbee counties" of Monroe County and Lowndes County, Mississippi were ceded under 1816 Treaty of the Chickasaw Council House, but "until 1820, when a survey revealed that a portion of the cession lay in Mississippi, it was assumed that the entire territory lay in Alabama." This section was isolated from other settlements in Mississippi until the 1830 Treaty of Dancing Rabbit Creek opened up the Choctaw Nation for settlement.

== See also ==
- Battle of Burnt Corn
- Fort Mims massacre

== Sources ==
- Miles, Edwin Arthur (1970) [1960]. Jacksonian Democracy in Mississippi. The American Scene: Comments and Commentators. New York City: De Capo Press. LCCN 78107415. SBN 306-71884-7.
