= Pushmataha (disambiguation) =

Pushmataha (c. 1760s–1824) was one of the three regional chiefs of the major divisions of the Choctaw in the 19th century.

Pushmataha may also refer to:

Places in the U.S.

- Pushmataha, Alabama
- Pushmataha County, Oklahoma
- Pushmataha County, Sequoyah
- Pushmataha District, an administrative region of the former Choctaw Nations in Indian Territory
- Pushmataha Wildlife Management Area

Ships

- Pushmataha (sloop), a merchant ship active during the American Civil War
- Pushmataha (YTB-830), a United States Navy Natick-class large harbor tug

Other uses

- Pushmataha Area Council, a Boy Scout organization in Mississippi, U.S.
