= Farewell Letter to the American People =

1832 letter by Choctaw Chief George W. Harkins

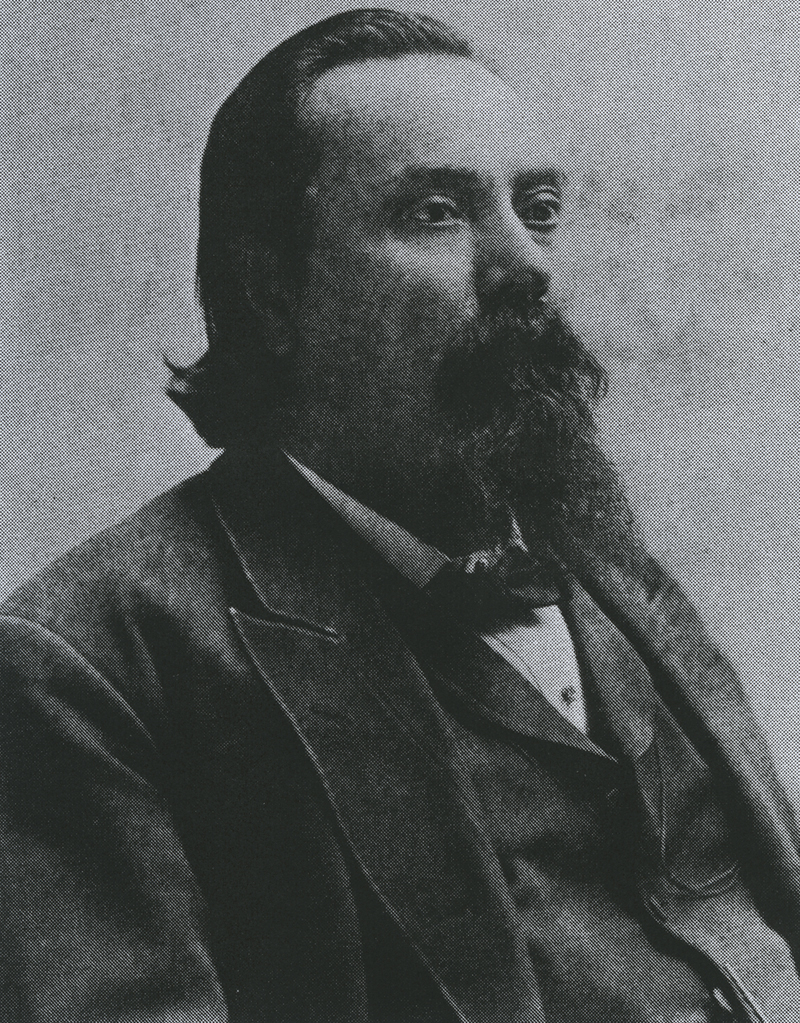
Col. George W. Harkins

The "Farewell Letter to the American People" was a widely published letter by Choctaw Chief George W. Harkins in February 1832. It denounced the removal of the Choctaw Nation to Oklahoma.

It also marked the beginning of a large process that would remove Native Americans who were living east of the Mississippi river, the Trail of Tears. Harkins wrote the letter to explain what it feels like to leave one's ancestral homes to satisfy the desires of others.

It is with considerable diffidence that I attempt to address the American people, knowing and feeling sensibly my incompetency; and believing that your highly and well improved minds would not be well entertained by the address of a Choctaw.... We as Choctaws rather chose to suffer and be free....

— -George W. Harkins, George W. Harkins to the American People

== Background ==
Arthur H. DeRosier claims the reason Choctaws were removed from their settled land is difficult to understand, because the history does not "reveal any major provocation by these Indians, or moral justification by the United States". The Choctaws were one of the largest tribes in the Mississippian area, and they were one of the first to be removed by the US treaty. The Choctaw tribe had created an economic system where they were prosperous with their own materials, and they were not dependent on the United States government for their wealth and their ability to survive. Their ability to sustain themselves without the assistance of the United States government only added to the confusion surrounding the necessity of the movement.

Despite the economic success of the Choctaw Nation, the White American settlers had an insatiable desire to have more land in the West. This desire mixed with the fear of an Indian attack left Native Americans across the region targets for removal. This desire extended across the majority of White settlers, which can be noted by the hundreds of settlers who applauded President Jackson for his definitive solution to the Indian Problem. For President Calhoun, removing the Choctaw nation first would benefit his overall moderate removal policy. The successful removal of a strong nation like the Choctaw would force other Indian groups to Consider their own removal to the West.

The Treaty of the Dancing Rabbit Creek was signed on 27 September 1830. It was ratified by a vote of thirty-five to twelve. The treaty said that the Choctaws would leave in three separate groups over the course of three years. Prior to the signing of the treaty, nine other treaties occurred between 1802 and 1830. In response to the ratification of the treaty, the Choctaw people elected new leaders for their nation because they felt as though their Previous leaders, Greenwood Leflore and Mushulatubbee, had led them astray. Harkins was elected for the Northwestern Choctaws. Between the time that the treaty was ratified and placed into action, Harkins worked with the Choctaw population to register them as citizens of the United States so that they could stay on their land. In February 1832, the second group, including Harkins, of Choctaws boarded the Huron steamboat. Aboard the ship, Harkins drafted his open letter.

== Content ==
It had three major parts:

- It spoke out against the settlers for promising better relations with the Choctaw Nation but continuing to wrong them with their treaties.
- Harkins admitted defeat believing that the only way for the Indian person to survive was to "form a government assimilated to that of our white brethren".
- The letter asked why this tragedy happened to the Choctaw Nation, who had been peaceful with the white settlers and had even fought alongside them, in the Creek War of 1813.

== Aftermath ==
The removal was only the first of the many Indian removal processes that would take place. The letter was only one of several letters that would be written from members of the Natives to the white settlers. It was written before several thousand Indians took the five-month journey after leaving Mississippi.

Many people were ill by the time they reached Indian Territory, and many other Native Americans who would be forced into the removal process would die. The US government realized that the cost of moving the Indians was "two to three times the original estimate".

After the removal of the Choctaw tribe, Jackson continued to put policies in motion that would continue to remove Native Americans east of the Mississippi River. That created the removal process known as the Trail of Tears and the removal of five different tribal nations. The Creek, Chickasaw, Cherokee, and Seminole Nations were removed after the Choctaw were.

== Impact ==
The "Farewell Letter to the American People" is one of many public letters that was written during this removal era. The continued use of using public writing as a platform for telling the Indian story was questioned. The desire for more stories about the "tragic hero" became requested. Letters like it and others with defiant speeches were in decline by 1840.

Letters like it were written and publicized frequently between 1774 and 1871. They provided an opportunity for Native Americans to create an open discourse surrounding Indian issues. They would be read by both Natives and whites. Phillip J. Round describes this as a way to engage with the imaginary public.

Engaging with the public in that way deemed native tribes as being more civilized and intellectual. Writing letters like this also allowed an accurate depiction of the native experience to be publicized and accepted by the white population in the United States.

The letter and its connection to the Choctaw tribe removal were also seen as a tragedy by some of the local newspapers. Although that occurred, people who believed it to be a tragedy were in the minority. It was only much later in the history, around the late 1950s, that people began to see the indigenous removal as a tragedy sparked by the desires of whites

== See also ==
- Greenwood Leflore
- Choctaw Trail of Tears
- George W. Harkins
- Trail of Tears
- Treaty of Dancing Rabbit Creek

== Bibliography ==
- Akers, Donna L. 1999. "Removing the Heart of the Choctaw People: Indian Removal from a Native Perspective". American Indian Culture and Research Journal 23 (3): 63–76. doi:10.17953/aicr.23.3.p52341016666h822.
- Black, Jason Edward. 2015. American Indians and the Rhetoric of Removal and Allotment. Univ. Press of Mississippi
- Black, Jason Edward. 2009. "Native Resistive Rhetoric and the Decolonization of American Indian Removal Discourse". Quarterly Journal of Speech 95 (1): 66–88.
- Foreman, Grant. 1972. Indian Removal: The Emigration of the Five Civilized Tribes of Indians. University of Oklahoma Press.
- Hershberger, Mary. 1999. "Mobilizing Women, Anticipating Abolition: The Struggle against Indian Removal in the 1830s". The Journal of American History 86 (1): 15–40. doi:10.2307/2567405.
- Rosier, Arthur H. De. 1981. The Removal of the Choctaw Indians. Knoxville: Univ. of Tennessee Press.
- Round, Phillip H., 2010. Removable Type: Histories of the Book in Indian Country, 1663-1880. Chapel Hill, NC: Univ of North Carolina Press.
- Sayre, Gordon M. 2005. The Indian Chief as Tragic Hero: Native Resistance and the Literatures of America, from Moctezuma to Tecumseh. Chapel Hill, NC: University of North Carolina Press.
