= Apuckshunubbee =

Choctaw chief (1740–1824)

- Born: 1740
- Died: October 18, 1824 (aged 83–84); Maysville, Kentucky
- Employer: Choctaw Nation
- Height: 6 ft 1 in (1.85 m)
- Title: Miko
- Successor: Robert Cole, then Greenwood LeFlore

Apuckshunubbee (c. 1740 – October 18, 1824) was one of three principal chiefs of the Choctaw tribe in the early nineteenth century, from before 1800. He led the western or Okla Falaya ("Long People") District of the Choctaw, of which the eastern edge ran roughly southeast from modern Winston County to Lauderdale County, then roughly southwest to Scott County, then roughly south-southeast to the western edge of Perry County all within Mississippi. His contemporaries were Pushmataha and Moshulatubbee, who respectively led the southern district Okla Hannali ("Six Towns People") and the north-eastern district Okla Tannap ("People on the Other Side").

During the early 19th-century, Apuckshunubbee and the other two division chiefs signed several treaties with the United States, ceding land to settlers in the hope of ending their encroachment on Choctaw territory. On his way to Washington, DC, in 1824 with the other two division chiefs and a Choctaw delegation to meet with US officials, Apuckshunubbee suffered a fall and died. His name was also spelled as Apvkshvnvbbee, Apυkshυnυbbee, Puckshenubbee, Pukshunnubbu, and Pukshunnubbee.

== Early life ==
Apuckshunubbee was likely born into a high-status family and clan; the Choctaw had a matrilineal system of property and hereditary leadership. Children belonged to their mother's clan, and her brothers would have been more important to his upbringing than his biological father, who belonged to a different clan.

He was described as "a large man, tall and bony, with a down look, and was of the superstitious and religious cast of mind."

== Treaties with US government ==
Apuckshunubbee was one of the three division chiefs among the Choctaw in Mississippi by 1801. He represented the western division, known as Okla Falaya (Tall People), located in central Mississippi.

As such a leader, he signed numerous treaties on behalf of the Choctaw with the US government, including the Treaty of Mount Dexter, Treaty of Fort St. Stephens, and the Treaty of Doak's Stand. By these land cessions, the Choctaw hoped to end European-American encroachment on their lands, but new settlers kept arriving and entering their territory. The US government did not enforce the treaty provisions.

He was nearly 80 years old when he made the 1824 trip with the other principal chiefs, Mushulatubbee and Pushmataha to protest settler violations made against the Treaty of Doak's Stand. The Choctaw delegation also included Talking Warrior, Red Fort, Nittahkachee, Col. Robert Cole and David Folsom, both Choctaw of mixed-race; Captain Daniel McCurtain, and Major John Pitchlynn, the U.S. Interpreter.

Apuckshunubbee, Pushmataha, and Mushulatubbee, the principal leaders of the Choctaws, went to Washington City (the 19th-century name for Washington, D.C.) to discuss encroaching settlement by European Americans on their lands. They sought expulsion of settlers or financial compensation by the government. The Choctaw planned to travel the Natchez Trace to Nashville, Tennessee, then to Lexington, Kentucky, onward to Maysville, Kentucky, across the Ohio River northward to Chillicothe, Ohio (former principal town of the Shawnee), then finally east over the "National Highway" to Washington City.

== Death ==
Apuckshunubbee died in Maysville, Kentucky reportedly of a broken neck caused by a fall from a hotel balcony. Other historians say he fell from a cliff. In 1939 Peter James Hudson wrote that he was "told by a Mississippi Choctaw that the body of Apvckshvnvbbee was brought back to Mississippi and buried at his home place."

According to the report in the Maysville Eagle, Apuckshunnubbe, the great Medal Chief, after supping at Captain Langhorne’s on Wednesday last, in the evening attempted to go to the river, missed his way, and was precipitated over the abutment of the road and received so severe contusions to his head and other injuries, as to render his recovery hopeless. He lingered until Friday night, in a perfectly senseless condition, when his soul winged to the presence of the Great Spirit.

— Earl White- Choctaw Nation of Oklahoma

His body is most likely located within the community of Lost Rabbit, because according to older maps found in the office of the Chancery Clerk of Madison County, Mississippi, this is where his homestead is located.

The death of Apuckshunubbee, together with that of Pushmataha in Washington, DC, of the croup that year, meant a major loss in experienced leaders among the three divisions, as each had led since about 1800. His successor was Robert Cole.

The Choctaw realized that the election of Andrew Jackson as president in 1828 meant that removal pressure would not relent. They continued to adopt certain assimilation practices and leaders agreed they could not afford military resistance.

In March 1830 the three division chiefs resigned and the National Council elected Greenwood LeFlore, formerly chief of the western district, as the single Principal Chief of the Choctaw, rather than having three, to lead negotiations with the government. An influential, wealthy Choctaw, he was bilingual, educated in American ways, and of partial European ancestry. He believed that removal was inevitable but worked to gain the best land and secure the rights of Choctaw.

First he drafted a treaty for removal, to gain the best conditions, and sent it to Washington. Washington officials received this coolly and insisted on another negotiation. LeFlore led other chiefs in signing the Treaty of Dancing Rabbit Creek, by which they ceded the remainder of their land in Mississippi and Alabama. By that time, LeFlore worked to obtain the best conditions for his people. He gained them the largest reservation in fertile land in Indian Territory, and a provision to allow Choctaw to stay in Mississippi as US citizens on reserved lands. (The US government failed to honor the land provision.) In 1831 most of the Choctaw began a staged, three-year removal to Indian Territory (later combined with Oklahoma Territory as a state.)

== See also ==
- Choctaw
- Pushmataha
- Mosholatubbee
- Greenwood LeFlore
- George W. Harkins
- Peter Pitchlynn
- Phillip Martin
- List of Choctaw chiefs
- List of Choctaw Treaties
