= Pushmataha Landing, Mississippi =

- Unincorporated community
- Location within Mississippi Location within the United States
- Coordinates: 34°08′12″N 90°51′36″W
- Country: United States
- State: Mississippi
- County: Coahoma
- Elevation: 151 ft (46 m)
- Time zone: UTC-6 (Central (CST))
  - Summer (DST): UTC-5 (CDT)
- Area code: 662
- GNIS feature ID: 692162

Pushmataha Landing, also known as Pushmataha, is an unincorporated community located in Coahoma County, Mississippi, United States.

== History ==
Pushmataha Landing was named after Pushmataha, a Choctaw chieftain. A post office operated under the name Pushmataha from 1880 to 1922.
