= Pushmataha, Alabama =

Unincorporated community in Alabama, United States

- Unincorporated community
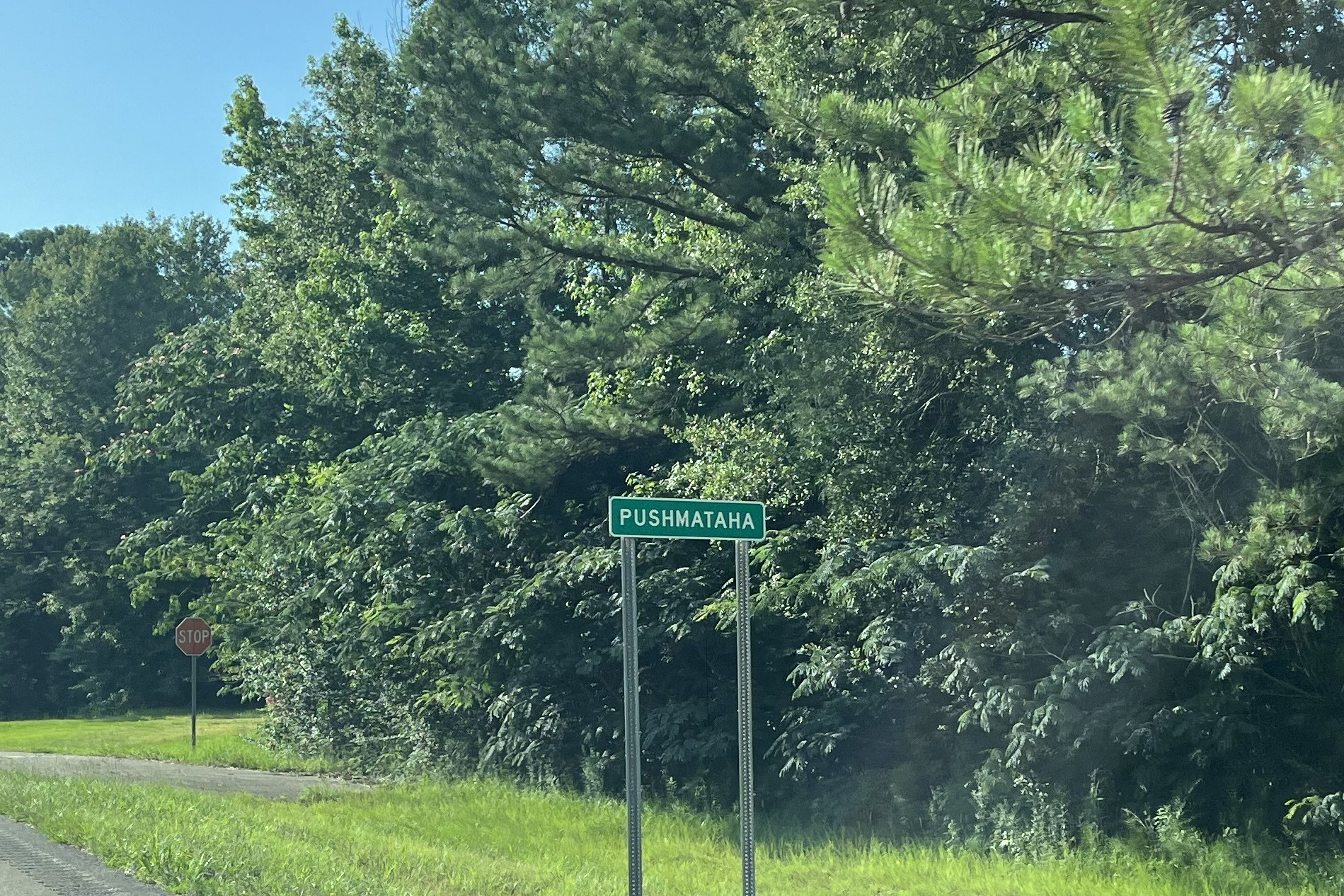

- Location within the state of Alabama Pushmataha, Alabama (the United States)
- Coordinates: 32°11′36″N 88°21′12″W
- Country: United States
- State: Alabama
- County: Choctaw
- Elevation: 243 ft (74 m)
- Time zone: UTC-6 (Central (CST))
  - Summer (DST): UTC-5 (CDT)
- Area codes: 205, 659

Pushmataha is an unincorporated community in Choctaw County, Alabama, United States. It was named in honor of famed Choctaw chief Pushmataha. Much of the community is part of the Pushmataha Historic District, listed on the Alabama Register of Landmarks and Heritage in October 2008.

Pushmataha's population as an unincorporated community was listed as 124 at the 1880 U.S. Census, the only time a figure was returned.

== Geography ==
Pushmataha is located at 32.19347°N 88.35336°W and has an elevation of 243 feet (74 m).

== Demographics ==
Historical population
Census	Pop.	Note	%±
1880	124		—
U.S. Decennial Census
