= Greenwood LeFlore =

American politician

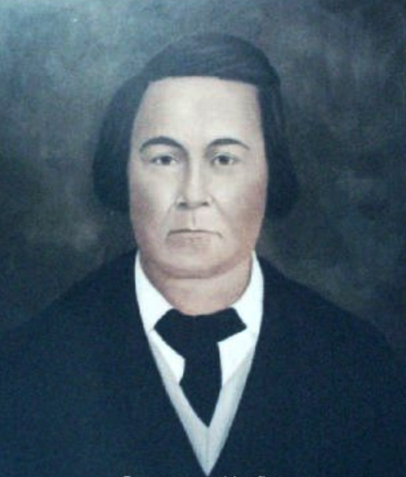
- Portrait before 1865

Chief of the Choctaw Nation
- In office March 15, 1830 – February 24, 1831
- Preceded by: Robert Cole
- Succeeded by: George W. Harkins

Member of the Mississippi Senate and Mississippi House of Representatives
- In office 1841–1844

Personal details
- Born: June 3, 1800 Lefleur's Bluff, Territory of Mississippi
- Died: August 31, 1865 (aged 65) Malmaison, Carroll County, Mississippi, U.S.
- Resting place: Greenwood LeFlore Cemetery, Carroll County, Mississippi, U.S.
- Party: Whig
- Spouses: Rosanah S. "Rosa" Donley (m. 1819; died 1829) Elizabeth Cody (m. 1830; died 1833) Priscilla Donley (m. 1834; died 1910)
- Education: Educated by Major Donley in Nashville, Tenn.
- Occupation: Politician, planter and entrepreneur

Greenwood LeFlore or Greenwood Le Fleur (June 3, 1800 – August 31, 1865) served as the elected Principal Chief of the Choctaw in 1830 before removal. Before that, the nation was governed by three district chiefs and a council of chiefs. A wealthy and regionally influential Choctaw of mixed-race, who belonged to the Choctaw elite due to his mother's rank, LeFlore had many connections in state and federal government. In 1830 LeFlore led other chiefs in signing the Treaty of Dancing Rabbit Creek, which ceded the remaining Choctaw lands in Mississippi to the US government and agreed to removal to Indian Territory. It also provided that Choctaw who chose to stay in Mississippi would have reserved lands, but the United States government failed to follow through on this provision.

While many leaders argued that removal was inevitable, others opposed the treaty and made death threats against LeFlore. Ousted by the tribal council in a coup, he stayed in Mississippi, where he settled in Carroll County and accepted United States citizenship. He was elected to the state government as a legislator and senator in the 1840s. During the American Civil War, he sided with the Union.

== Background ==
LeFlore was the first son of Rebecca Cravatt, a high-ranking Choctaw niece of the chief Pushmataha, and Louis LeFleur, a French fur trader and explorer from French Canada who worked for the Panton, Leslie & Company, based in Spanish Florida. Because the Choctaw had a matrilineal system for property and hereditary leadership, LeFlore gained elite status from his mother's family and clan. By the 1820s, as the historian Greg O'Brien notes, the Choctaw called such mixed-race children itibapishi toba (to become a brother or sister), which emphasized the connection to Choctaw, or issish iklanna (half-blood), which seemed to imitate Euro-American concepts. O'Brien notes the importance of their being first of all, part of the Choctaw elites. Choctaw chiefs recognized the advantage of using such mixed-race elite men as "trailblazers into an unprecedented universe of capitalist accumulation and renewable wealth."

Some, like LeFlore, gained a Euro-American education that enabled them to negotiate the changing world developing in the American South. When LeFlore was twelve, his father sent him to Nashville to be educated by Americans.

== Marriage and family ==
At age 17, LeFlore married Rosa Donley in Nashville, whom he met there and brought back with him to the Choctaw Nation when he returned in 1817. After her death in 1829 he married again twice. He married Elizabeth Coody (or Cody) in 1830. He married Priscilla Donley, who was the sister of his first wife, in 1834.

== Advocate of civilization ==
While LeFlore was not said to be popular among the full-blood tribal men, he became powerful and influential within the tribe at an early age, largely because of his mother's clan and maternal uncle's position and his own skills. With other leaders, he struggled to resist European-American encroachment while adapting to some of the new ways and the increasing pressure from the United States government in support of removal.

When Leflore was 22, he became a chief of the western division of the Choctaw Nation, when it was still in Mississippi. He is credited with abolishing the Choctaw "blood for blood" law, which dictated rounds of revenge for murders. LeFlore supported the "civilization" program, which U.S. President George Washington and Henry Knox developed during the Washington administration. Particularly after Andrew Jackson's election as president in 1828, he encouraged the Choctaw to make permanent residences, cultivate the land in agriculture, convert to Christianity, and send their children to United States schools for education.

wee [sic] are anxious to become sivillize [sic] Nation if our father lets us rest few years but wee [sic] have been pastered [sic] for land so much wee [sic] dont know what to do hartly [sic], but I hope wee [sic] will rest now awhile.

— Greenwood LeFlore, 1827

== Removal or U.S. citizenship ==
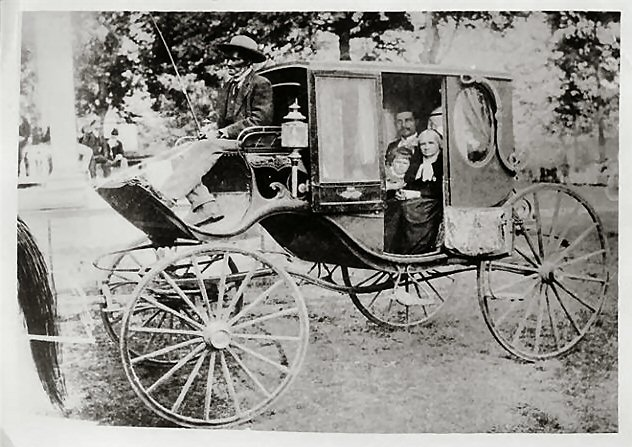
Greenwood LeFlore's horse carriage, late 1800s.

Despite being recognized as one of the "Five Civilized Tribes", the Choctaw were under pressure from encroaching European-American settlers. The settlers kept entering the Choctaw Nation lands in great numbers. The US government wanted to remove the Choctaw to lands west of the Mississippi River.

With the election of Andrew Jackson as president in 1828, who supported Indian removal, many Choctaw claimed that removal was inevitable. They concluded they could not give armed resistance. After passage of the Indian Removal Act of 1830, the chiefs of the western and eastern districts resigned, and on March 15, 1830, the council elected LeFlore as principal chief, the first time that power had been so centralized among the Choctaw. He drafted a treaty which he sent to Washington, to try to secure the best terms for the Choctaw.

United States representatives came out to the Choctaw for a treaty council, where LeFlore used his formidable personal political capital and position as head of a unified tribe to secure the largest and most desirable areas of what would later be called Indian Territory. In addition, he believed that Article XIV would be honored and allow the Choctaw to keep some reserves in Mississippi. He regarded removal as inevitable, given his assessment of the politics and the sheer numbers of the growing European-American population.

The treaty included provisions allowing those Choctaw who chose to do so, to remain in Mississippi and become a citizen of the United States.

ART. XIV. Each Choctaw head of a family being desirous to remain and become a citizen of the States, shall be permitted to do so, by signifying his intention to the Agent within six months from the ratification of this Treaty, and he or she shall thereupon be entitled to a reservation of one section of six hundred and forty acres of land, to be bounded by sectional lines of survey; in like manner shall be entitled to one half that quantity for each unmarried child which is living with him over ten years of age; and a quarter section to such child as may be under 10 years of age, to adjoin the location of the parent. If they reside upon said lands intending to become citizens of the States for five years after the ratification of this Treaty, in that case a grant in fee simple shall issue; said reservation shall include the present improvement of the head of the family, or a portion of it. Persons who claim under this article shall not lose the privilege of a Choctaw citizen, but if they ever remove are not to be entitled to any portion of the Choctaw annuity.

William Ward, who was the U.S. agent for the Indians, "refused to enroll the Choctaw claimants' reserves" in Mississippi, which undermined LeFlore's objectives for the treaty and led him to consider it a failure.

LeFlore's accomplishments in unifying and strengthening the Choctaw people are still honored as the historian James Taylor Carson writes, "He was a Choctaw nationalist who sought to carve out a new and powerful nation for his people within the Cotton Kingdom of the Old South." His pragmatic approach to their removal from ancestral lands is still controversial.

Many Choctaw at the time believed that LeFlore had let them down and could have refused removal. Mushulatubbee, who had resigned, took back his office as Chief of the Western Division (which would later become the new Choctaw Nation in the post-removal Indian Territory), and rejected many of the civilizing measures which the national council had ordered during the previous two years. The Western Division council led a movement to depose LeFlore, and in a successful coup, they elected his nephew George W. Harkins in his place.

Jackson and other American leaders at the time had generally low opinions of mixed-race leaders, related more to their own ideas of race than an ability to appraise the Native American leaders. Carson believes that such negative opinions have affected the writing of historians for decades and their assessments of men such as LeFlore. He considers LeFlore and leaders like him to have been a new Creole generation, raised as Choctaw but absorbing what they could of the changing world to make a place for their peoples.

In the event, the Choctaw were awarded the largest territory of any removed tribe. It was located in the fertile, forested southeast corner of what is now Oklahoma. LeFlore did receive a grant of land in Mississippi, for 1,000 acres (4 km²) of land (his grant by the treaty, including allowances for unmarried children living with him.)

== LeFlore as a U.S. citizen ==
In the 1840s, LeFlore was elected Mississippi representative and senator. He was a fixture of Mississippi high society and a personal friend of Jefferson Davis. He was elected to represent Carroll County in the state house for two terms, and elected by the legislature as a state senator, serving one term. He became a wealthy planter and amassed a huge estate, where slaves worked acres of cotton. When a woman named Arena James died in 1939, it was reported that she was the last surviving slave and had been at Malmaison from her birth in 1829 until emancipation. During the American Civil War Leflore opposed the Confederacy and secession. He sided with the Union when Mississippi seceded from the United States. When federal troops approached his property, he offered them assistance and said he was happy to see "the old flag again carried by United States Soldiers."

== Malmaison ==
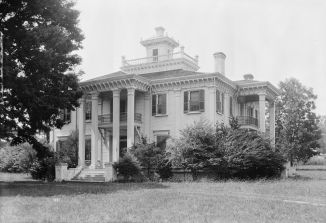
Malmaison, Greenwood LeFlore's home

LeFlore wanted a manor house that befitted his status as a wealthy planter. He commissioned James Harris, a Georgian, to design it. An admirer of Napoleon Bonaparte and Empress Joséphine, LeFlore had the house designed in the French style. For its name, he chose that of the Château de Malmaison, ten miles west of Paris on the Seine." Constructed c.1855, the house stood in Carroll County, Mississippi. LeFlore occupied it until his death in 1865.

To furnish the mansion, LeFlore imported most of its contents from France, where they had been made to order. Silver, glassware, and china were acquired in sets of dozens. The drawing room suite comprised 30 pieces of solid mahogany, finished in genuine gold and upholstered in silk damask. The house also contained mirrors, tables, large four-poster beds of rosewood with silk and satin canopies, and four tapestry curtains depicting the four palaces of Napoleon and Joséphine: Versailles, Malmaison, Saint Cloud and Fontainebleau.

Malmaison was one of the show places of Mississippi. It was a great tourist attraction and was visited annually by hundreds from all parts of the United States. Around it clung the memories of the transition of Mississippi from Indian territory to its present status.

The mansion remained in use by LeFlore's descendants until it was destroyed in a fire in 1942; the cause of the fire has never been determined. Only a few pieces of crystal and silver and some chairs were salvaged from the ruins. The horse-draw carriage formerly used by LeFloreon visits to Andrew Jackson and other officials in Washington, D.C. was also saved and has been preserved. Artifacts and furnishings from Malmaison – including a bedroom suite, paintings, and children's toys – are on display in the Malmaison Room at the Museum of the Mississippi Delta.

== American Civil War and death ==
LeFlore was a Southern Unionist. He was openly and notoriously opposed to secession and to the rebellion throughout its progress. In retaliation, a party of rebels fired on his home and attempted to set fire to Malmaison. LeFlore is said to have defied them, and calling for a United States flag declared his intention to die there under its folds. He died a few months after the war ended at the age of 65. He left, in addition to the mansion, an estate of 15,000 acres and 400 slaves. With emancipation any slaves became freedmen, but many may have stayed on the plantation to work. It is said that Malmaison contributed voluntarily and largely to assist the United States Army when they arrived in February 1864. LeFlore was buried wrapped in the American flag, on the estate.

Carson describes LeFlore:

He was first and foremost a man whose family had positioned him to draw together Choctaw and Anglo-American worlds. He owned slaves which became freedmen, read and wrote, and prayed at camp meetings, but he also presided over a political hierarchy of pipe lighters and captains, provided food, shelter, and educational opportunities for his followers, and promulgated his vision of the Choctaw future at the foot of the mound [Nanih Waiya] that had given his people life.

== See also ==
- Apuckshunubbee
- Mosholatubbee
- Pushmataha
- George W. Harkins
- Peter Pitchlynn
- Phillip Martin
- List of Choctaw treaties
