= Pushmataha (YTB-830) =

Tugboat of the United States Navy

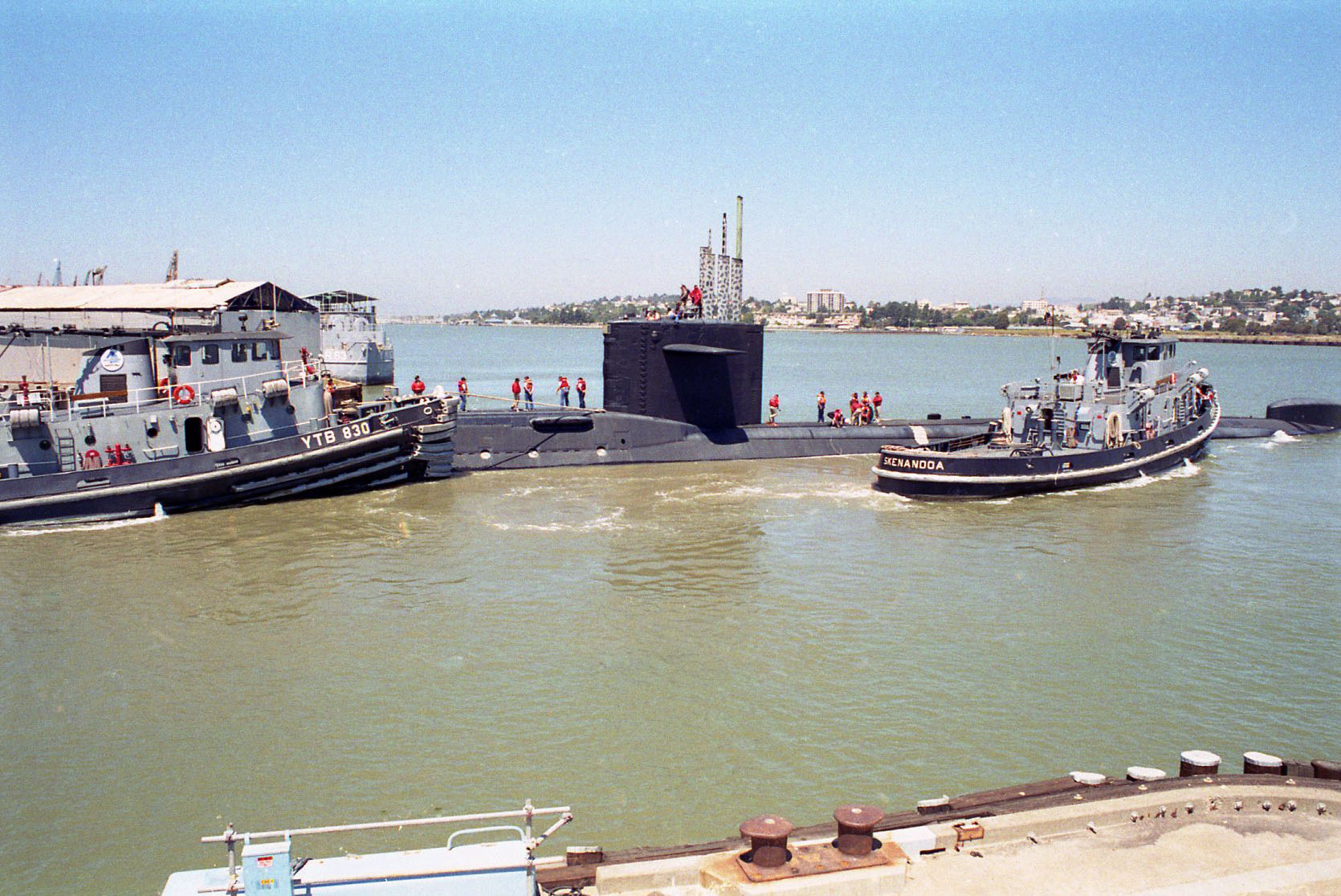
- USS Parche (SSN-683) is backing out her berth at Mare Island on 19 August 1994 with the assistance of Pushmataha (YTB-830) and Skenandoa (YTB-835). The bow of Floating Workshop YR-63 is seen behind Parche

History

United States
- Awarded: 5 June 1973
- Builder: Marinette Marine, Marinette, Wisconsin
- Laid down: 13 December 1973
- Launched: 31 July 1974
- In service: 14 October 1974
- Stricken: 2 October 1995
- Status: Unknown; scrapped?

General characteristics
- Class & type: Natick-class large harbor tug
- Displacement: 286 long tons (291 t) (light); 346 long tons (352 t) (full)
- Length: 108 ft (33 m)
- Beam: 31 ft (9.4 m)
- Draft: 14 ft (4.3 m)
- Speed: 12 knots (14 mph; 22 km/h)
- Complement: 12
- Armament: None

Pushmataha (YTB-830) was a United States Navy Natick-class large harbor tug. Pushmataha was named in honor of noted Choctaw Nation warrior and statesman Chief Pushmataha.

== Construction ==
The contract for Pushmataha was awarded 5 June 1973. She was laid down on 13 December 1973 at Marinette, Wisconsin, by Marinette Marine and launched 31 June 1974.

== Operational history ==
Pushmataha was assigned to the San Francisco Bay area. Stricken from the Navy List 2 October 1995, she was transferred to the Maritime Administration 13 September 1995.
