= Open discourse =

Discourse Analysis

Open Discourse is a technical term used in discourse analysis and Sociolinguistics and is commonly contrasted with Closed Discourse. The concept of open and closed discourse is associated with the overlay of open and closed discourse communities and open and closed communication events. Keys to determining whether a discourse is open or closed include access to information, equity of access, open access, quality of discourse and mechanisms and modalities of discourse control: overt, covert, implicit and incidental. As a conceptual filter and cultural construct, ideology is a function and mechanism of discourse control. Channel and signal of a communication event and register of communication together control discourse and therefore, determine the degree of social inclusion and social exclusion and, by extension, the relative efficiency of that communication event. Open and closed discourse operate along a continuum where absolute closure and complete openness are theoretically untenable due to noise in the channel. The nature of the channel, signal, code, replicability, recording, transmissibility, cataloguing, recall or other variable of a communication event and its information control and context of transmission-as-event, impact its relative position along the continuum between open and closed discourse. In all cases, open discourse is assumed to be sustained discourse.

Van Dijk (c.2003: p. 357) holds that:

"Although most discourse control is contextual or global, even local details of meaning, form, or style may be controlled, e.g. the details of an answer in class or court, or choice of lexical items or jargon in courtrooms, classrooms or newsrooms (Martin Rojo 1994).

== Internet, weblogging and social media ==
In regards to the Internet as cultural artifact and information as complex adaptive system with emergent properties of open discourse such as weblogs and social media, Boyd (February 2009) holds that:

"The Web is the most important and valuable human artifact ever created. And, it is not owned by any single group, government, company, or person. It is not patented, no one is in charge, and we have no idea whatsoever as to how much we have invested in it, or even how much it costs us to keep it running.... The Web – and in particular the rise of the so-called blogosphere – has led to a resurgence of open public discourse that is unparalleled since the emergence of independent newspapers and pamphleteers at the outset of the Industrial Revolution. The Web has grown from a handful of websites to millions of individuals and organizations publishing on every conceivable topic from every imaginable perspective."

== Open discourse as open-endedness: text and context as living document ==
Open discourse as living document may also be understood as the open-endedness in both a communication event and the inability to collapse a communication event into definitives, the unequivocal import of a cultural artifact and the associated inability to resolve ambiguity due to noise and ever-changing context and audience, as Graham (2000: p. 5) further states:

...I understand the play on multiplicity of interpretation and open‐endedness that ambiguity signifies however, the term ambiguous is itself ambiguous – it not only means “open to various interpretations” but also “of doubtful and uncertain nature; difficult to understand” and “lacking clearness or definiteness, obscure” (Macquarie Essential Dictionary, 1999: 23).

== Medicine, scientific publishing and pharmacology ==
Dayton (2006) frames the transition from open access to open discourse in the Internet discourse community in regards to the parameters of scientific publishing thus:

"The [I]nternet is expanding the realm of scientific publishing to include free and open public debate of published papers. Journals are beginning to support web posting of comments on their published articles and independent organizations are providing centralized web sites for posting comments about any published article. The trend promises to give one and all access to read and contribute to cutting edge scientific criticism and debate." NB: proper noun of 'Internet' repaired from the error 'internet'.

== Urban planning and public discourse ==
Ter Borg and Dijking (1995) explore discourse control in relation to urban planning, urban development, public participation and stakeholder engagement in their analysis of two case studies.

== Pedagogical discourse ==
Dawson & Taylor (1998) have documented experiential learnings of the logistics of open and critical discourse in the discourse community of the science classroom.

In framing the relationship between the discourse community of a classroom and therefore pedagogical discourse throughout all media and associating open discourse to a democratic ideology Celce-Murcia & Olshtain (2000: p. 11) hold that:

"...it is important that teachers understand what critical discourse analysis is and that they are at the very least sensitized to the potentially discriminatory and demeaning discourse that may arise in the classroom and in teaching materials and be prepared to deal with it constructively (i.e., to use such instances of discourse as opportunities for discussions and activities that can make the language classroom a more democratic and open discourse community)."

== See also ==
- Critical Discourse Analysis
- Discourse
- Dialogical analysis
- Pragmatics
- Rhetoric
- Sociolinguistics
- Stylistics (linguistics)
- Analysis of subjective logics
- Semiotics
