= Pushmataha (sloop) =

Pushmataha was a merchant sloop. Apparently named for noted Choctaw Nation warrior and statesman Chief Pushmataha, little is known of the vessel except for its service to Confederate commercial interests during the American Civil War.

In a war dispatch dated October 8, 1863, the USS Cayuga—a ship assigned to the Union Navy's West Gulf Blockading Squadron—reported engaging the Pushmataha off Texas’ Sabine Pass, on the Calcasieu River in Louisiana. While attempting to enter the Mermentau River the Pushmataha ran aground, three-quarters of a mile from a beach.

Upon being boarded by a party from the Cayuga, the Pushmataha was found to have been abandoned by its crew, which was rowing ashore in boats. Its crew had opened gunpowder casks and set one on fire. The Cayuga’s crew extinguished the fire and, after being unable to refloat the ship, removed its cargo and destroyed it.

According to papers found aboard the Pushmataha it had received its cargo of rum, wine and gunpowder in Havana, Cuba. The ship bore the English ensign (thought to be the British Red Ensign) and, according to her registration papers, was crewed by two Englishmen, one Italian, and one Portuguese. The Pushmataha’s muster roll had been signed in Havana on September 22, 1863 by “Her Britannic Majesty’s acting consul-general in Cuba,” according to the report by the Cayuga.
