= Choctaw =

Indigenous people of the United States

Chahta
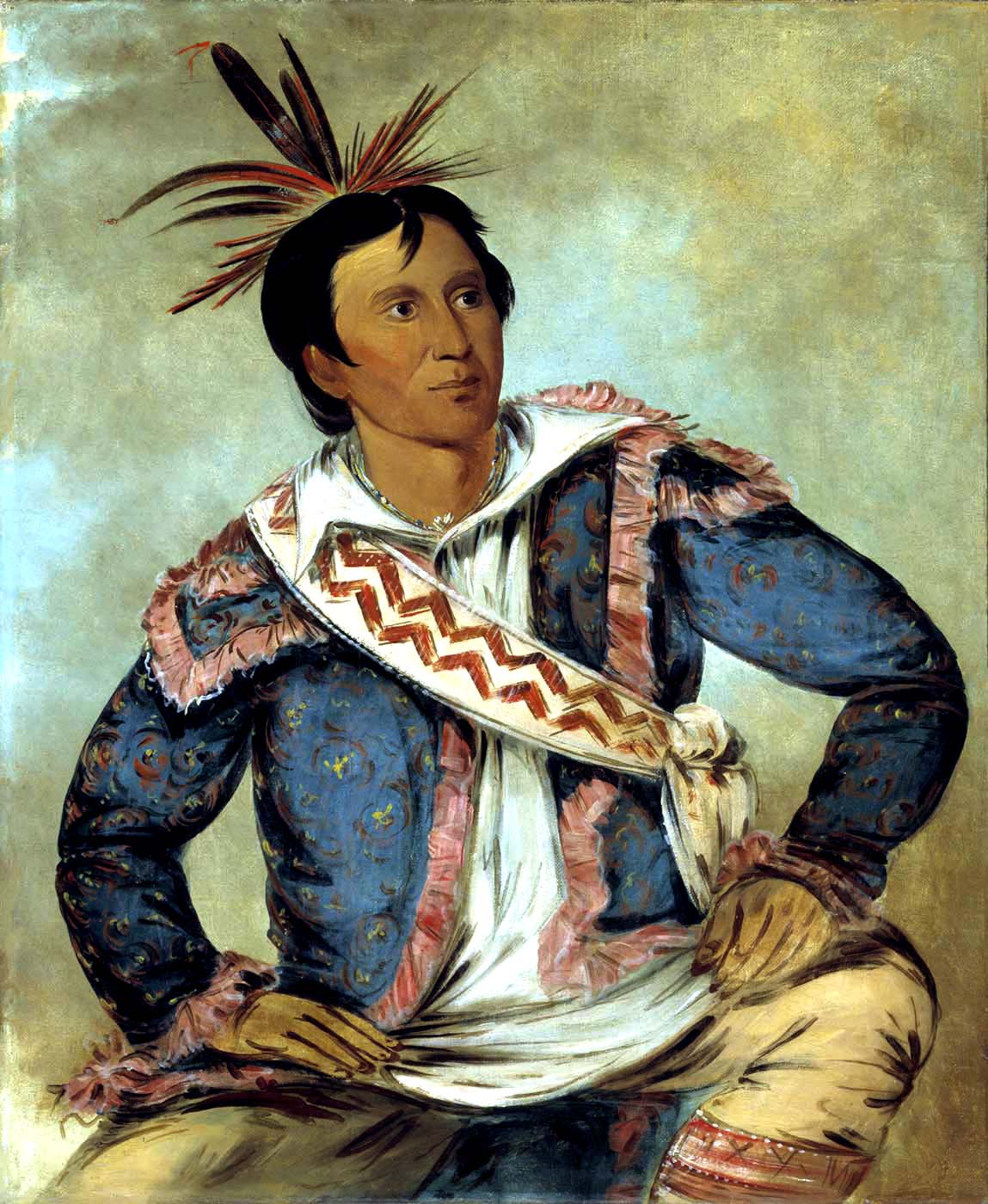
- Hatchootucknee, creator of the Choctaw Lighthorse as painted by George Catlin, 1834

Total population
- Approximately 214,884 total 212,000 (Nation of Oklahoma 2023); 11,000 (Mississippi Band 2020); 284 (Jena Band 2011)

Regions with significant populations
- United States (Oklahoma, Mississippi, Louisiana, Alabama)

Languages
- American English, Choctaw

Religion
- Protestant, Roman Catholic, formerly Indigenous religion, including Southeastern Ceremonial Complex

Related ethnic groups
- Chickasaw, Muscogee, Natchez, Alabama, Koasati, and Seminole

- People: Chahta
- Language: Chahta anumpa, Hand Talk
- Country: Chahta Okla

The Choctaw (Choctaw: Chahta Choctaw pronunciation: [tʃahtá(ʔ)]) people are one of the Indigenous peoples of the Southeastern Woodlands of the United States, historically based in what is now Louisiana, Mississippi, and Alabama. The Choctaw language is a Western Muskogean language. Today, Choctaw people are enrolled primarily in three federally recognized tribes: the Choctaw Nation of Oklahoma, the Mississippi Band of Choctaw Indians, and the Jena Band of Choctaw Indians in Louisiana. The Yowani Choctaw, a historic Choctaw band, are federally recognized as a people within the Caddo Nation and are also enrolled as citizens of the Choctaw Nation of Oklahoma and the Mississippi Band of Choctaw Indians. Choctaw descendants are also members of other tribes.

== Etymology ==
The Choctaw autonym is Chahta, while "Choctaw" is an anglicized spelling. Several theories exist regarding the origin of the name Chahta. According to anthropologist John R. Swanton, the Choctaw derived their name from an early leader of the Choctaw people named Chahta. Another theory, proposed by Henry S. Halbert, suggests that Chahta is a blended form of the Choctaw phrase hvcha hattak, meaning "people of the river", a reference to early Choctaw towns located along the Tombigbee River.

== Language ==
Modern geographic distribution of the Choctaw language

The Choctaw language belongs to the Muskogean language family and was widely known among American frontiersmen in the early 19th century. In 1870, the Christian missionary and fluent Choctaw speaker Cyrus Byington published a Choctaw dictionary, Grammar of the Choctaw Language. Subsequent revised editions incorporated contributions from the American historian Henry S. Halbert, who was also fluent in Choctaw, as well as from the anthropologist John R. Swanton.

Choctaw, or Chahta as it is known in the native language, is closely related to the Chickasaw language. Some linguists regard Choctaw and Chickasaw as dialects of a single original language. This view is supported by Choctaw and Chickasaw origin traditions, which state that both peoples emerged from a shared ancestral population.

The Choctaw Nation of Oklahoma currently offers courses in the Choctaw language. Choctaw continues to be spoken as part of daily life on the Mississippi Choctaw reservation. Although language use declined during the 20th century, Choctaw remains a living language and has experienced a resurgence in recent years among members of the Choctaw Nation of Oklahoma, the Mississippi Band of Choctaw Indians, the Jena Band of Choctaw Indians, and the Yowani Choctaws.

=== Orthography ===
The written Choctaw language is based on the English form of the Roman alphabet and was developed in the early 19th century in conjunction with the United States government's so-called "civilization program". The alphabet devised by Cyrus Byington, along with a version later modified by John R. Swanton, is shown here.

==== Byington (Original) ====
The Choctaw "Speller" alphabet as found in the Chahta Holisso Ai Isht Ia Vmmona, 1800s

==== Byington/Swanton (Linguistic) ====
The Choctaw linguistic alphabet as found in the Choctaw Language Dictionary by Cyrus Byington and modified by John Swanton, 1909

The following table is an example of Choctaw text and its translation:

Chahta Anumpa: Hattak yuka keyu hokυtto yakohmit itibachυfat hieli kυt, nan isht imaiυlhpiesa atokmυt itilawashke; yohmi ha hattak nana hohkia, keyukmυt kanohmi hohkia okla moma nana isht aim aiυlhpiesa, micha isht aimaiυlhtoba he aima ka kanohmi bano hosh isht ik imaiυlhpieso kashke. Amba moma kυt nana isht imachukma chi ho tuksυli hokmakashke.

English language: That all free men, when they form a special compact, are equal in rights, and that no man or set of men are entitled to exclusive, separate public emolument or privileges from the community, but in consideration of public services.

== Culture ==
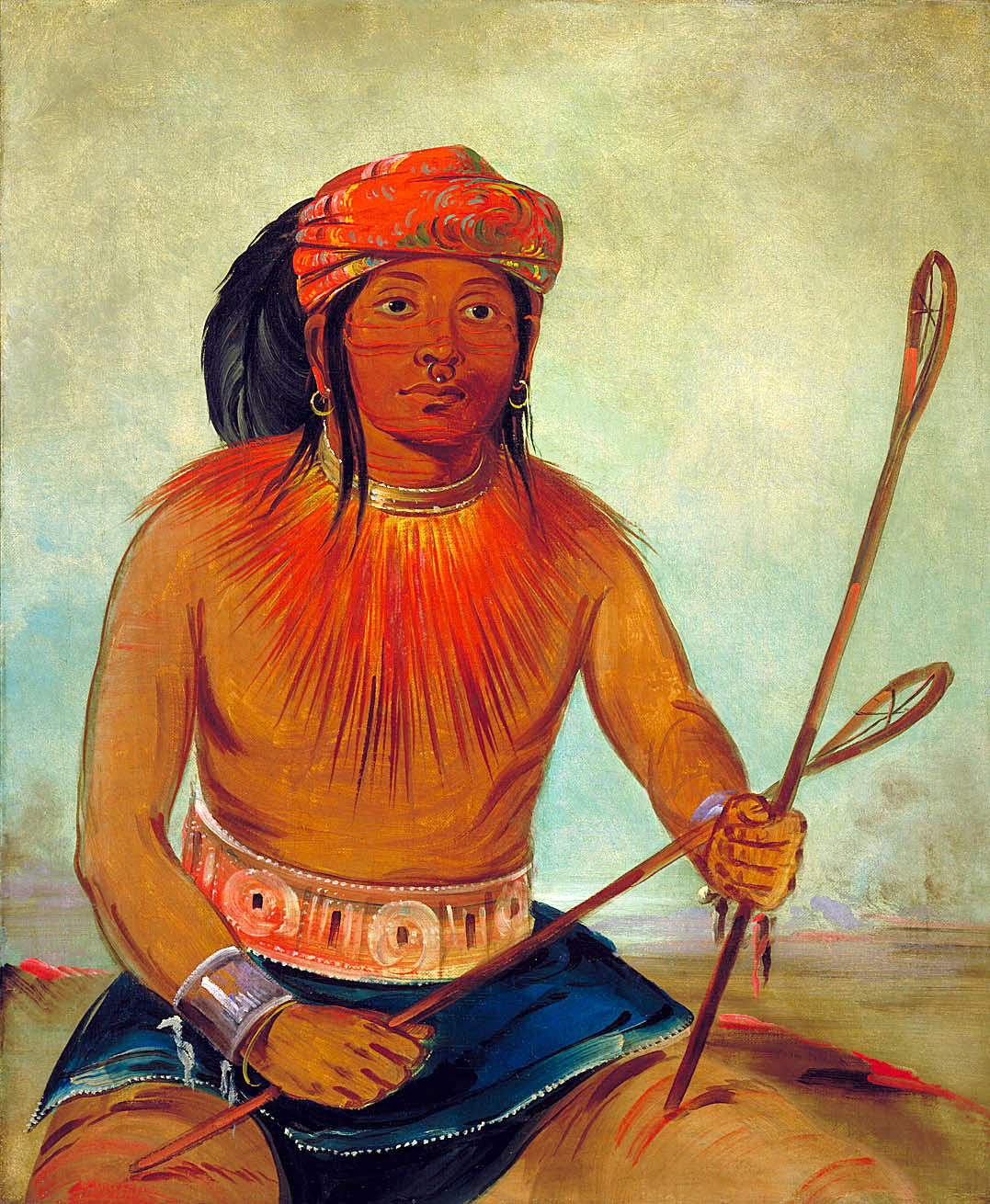
Tullockchishko (Drinks the Juice of the Stones), a Choctaw stickball player, 1834.

Choctaw culture, as it is understood today, has historical roots extending back to the 16th century. Prior to this period, what is known of Choctaw culture derives primarily from oral traditions and from the documented participation of the Choctaw people in the wider Southeastern Ceremonial Complex. From at least the 16th century to the present day, a distinct Choctaw culture has been expressed through rich traditions of song, dance, dress, beading, pottery, basketry, and stickball.

Choctaw people continue to maintain these traditions in their personal and daily lives, as well as through participation in community events. One prominent example is the mid-summer Choctaw Indian Fair hosted by the Mississippi Band of Choctaw Indians. The fair brings together Choctaw people from around the world and features hospitality alongside activities such as traditional cooking, entertainment, dancing, and stickball.

Choctaw culture is an ancient tradition that continues to thrive within the nations and communities of the Choctaw Nation of Oklahoma in Oklahoma, the Mississippi Band of Choctaw Indians in Mississippi, the Jena Band of Choctaw Indians in Louisiana, and among the Yowani Choctaws in Mississippi, Texas, Louisiana, and in Oklahoma as part of the Caddo Confederacy.

=== Traditional religion ===
The traditional Choctaw belief system developed within the broader North American Southeastern Ceremonial Complex. Choctaw spiritual beliefs included the existence of both a benevolent spirit and a malevolent spirit, and they may also have practiced sun, or Hvshtahli, worship. Anthropologist John Swanton wrote that the Choctaw "anciently regarded the sun as a deity", to whom they ascribed the power of life and death. He noted that the sun was believed to watch over the earth and that fire, as its most vivid representation, was considered intelligent and to act in concert with the sun, maintaining continual interaction with it.

The term napisa ("the one who sees") expressed the reverence the Choctaw held for the sun. Anthropologists have theorized that the Mississippian ancestors of the Choctaw placed the sun at the center of their cosmological system. By the mid-18th century, Choctaws viewed the sun as a living being and believed it ensured honesty in diplomacy. As a result, Choctaw diplomats customarily spoke only on sunny days, postponing meetings during cloudy or rainy weather until the sun returned, often citing the need for further discussion. The sun, as a symbol of power and reverence, was a central element of southeastern Indigenous cultures.

Choctaw prophets are known to have addressed the sun in ritual contexts. Swanton recorded that an elder informed Wright that prior to the arrival of missionaries, the Choctaw had no formal concept of prayer, but that anciently their hopaii, or prophets, were sometimes accustomed to address the sun directly.

=== Traditional tribal structure ===
The traditional Choctaw tribal structure was organized around two primary moieties: Imoklashas (elders) and Inhulalatas (youth). Each moiety consisted of several iksas, or clans, and in rare instances included a totemic clan. Choctaw identity was established first through moiety affiliation and second through membership in an individual's iksa. The Choctaw followed a matrilineal kinship system, in which children were born into their mother's iksa, and the mother's clan conferred social identity and status.

A key feature of this matrilineal system was the prominent role of the maternal uncle, who often served as a father figure and caretaker to his sister's children. The Choctaw people's reverence for women and the Mother goddess was also reflected in their religious and spiritual traditions, particularly in their veneration of the sacred mound of Nanih Waiya, known as the "Mother Mound". Nanih Waiya is a major earthwork platform mound located in central-eastern Mississippi and remains a place of female pilgrimage for prayer, song, and dance to the present day.

Anthropologist John R. Swanton wrote extensively about the iksas in his 1931 work Source Material for the Social and Ceremonial Life of the Choctaw Indians. At the time of his writing, the principal iksas exercising influence over the others were the Okla Falaya, meaning "Long People"; the eastern Okla Tannap, meaning "People on the Other Side"; and the southern Okla Hannali, meaning "Six Towns People".

After the United States government violated multiple treaties with the Choctaw and ultimately forced their removal from their traditional lands in Mississippi during the Trail of Tears, the Choctaw reestablished their political organization in Indian Territory. They reorganized according to the three most powerful districts of their former homeland, naming each district after its principal leader. The district of the Okla Tannap was named for Moshulatubbee, the Okla Falaya district for Apuckshunubbee, and the Okla Hannali district for Pushmataha.

=== Traditional communal economy ===
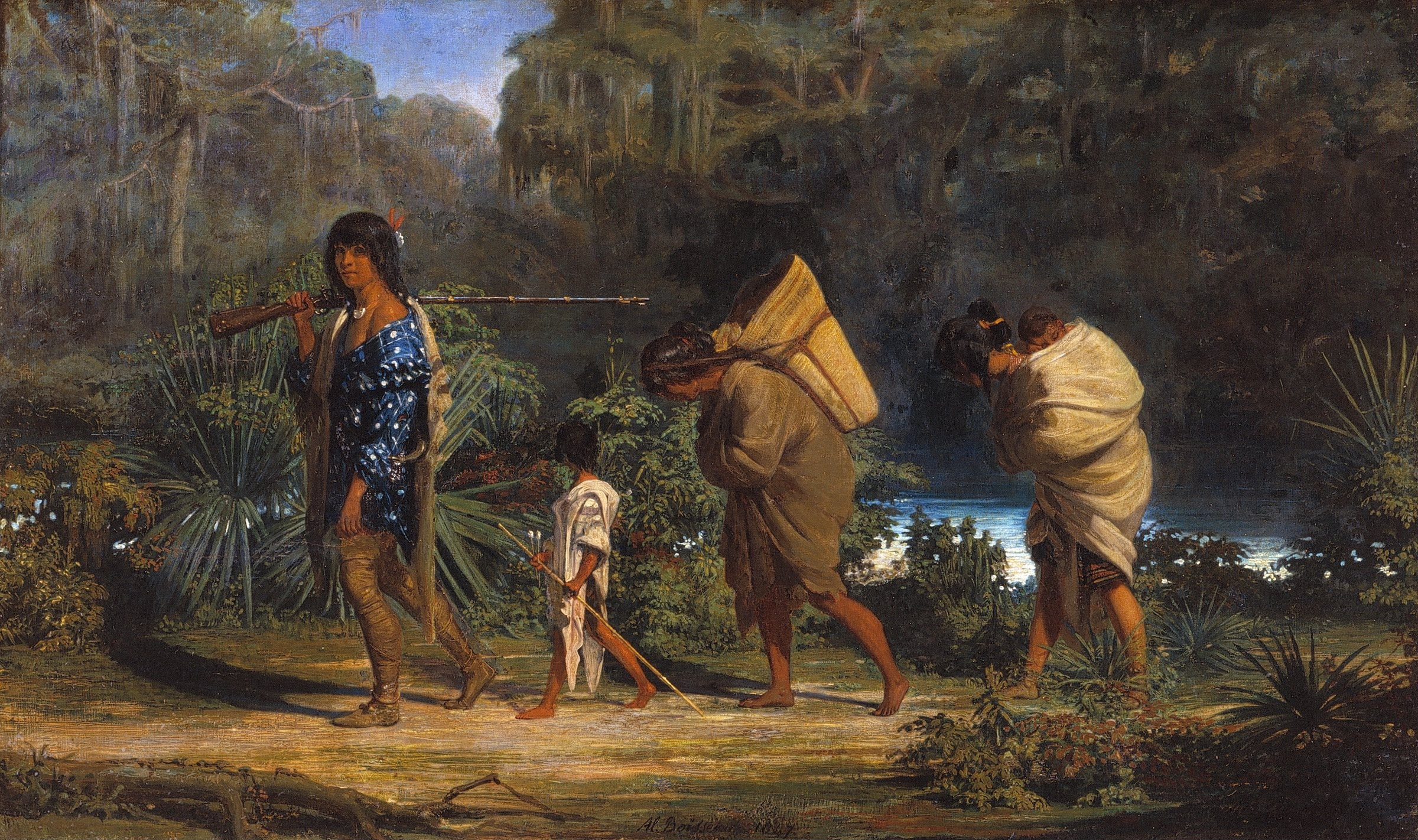
Louisiana Indians Walking Along a Bayou Alfred Boisseau, 1847

Early Choctaw communities practiced communal labor and shared their harvests. They found it difficult to understand why English settlers allowed members of their own communities to suffer from hunger.

In Ireland, the generosity of the Choctaw Nation during the Great Famine of the mid-19th century is remembered to this day and has been commemorated by the sculpture Kindred Spirits, located in a park in Midleton, County Cork.

=== Historical architecture ===
Both the Chickasaw and the Choctaw traditionally constructed three types of buildings for each family: (1) a summer house, built in an oblong-square form; (2) a corn house, also constructed as an oblong square; and (3) a winter house, which was circular in shape and commonly known as the "hot house".

=== Historical clothing ===
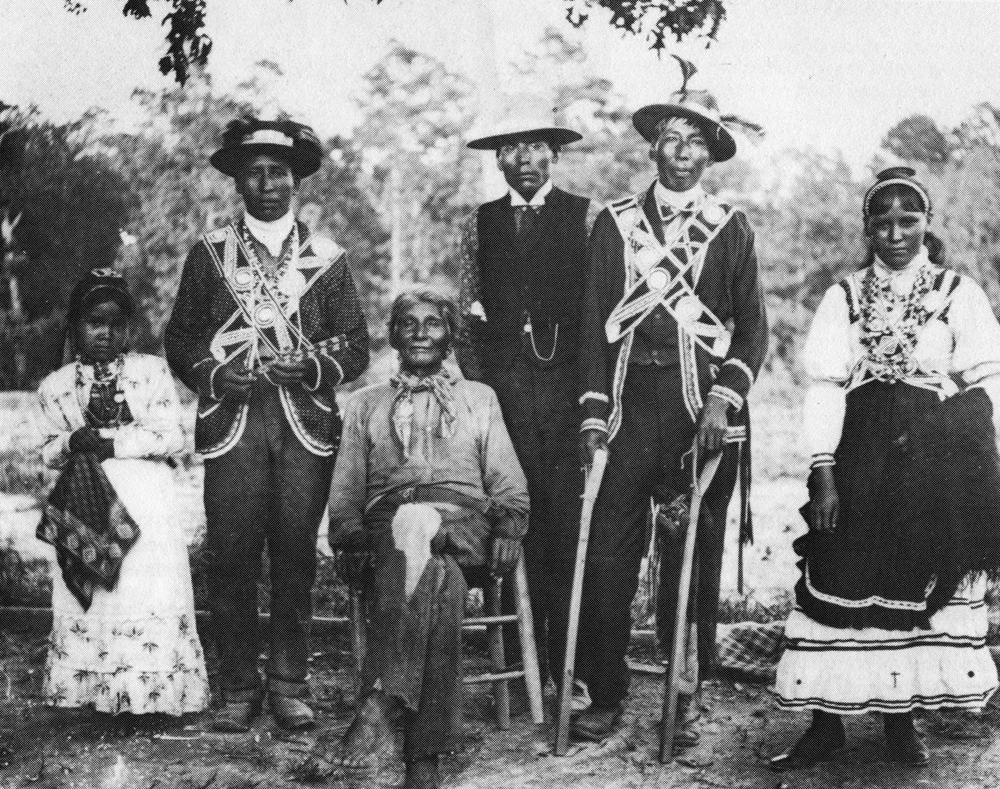
Mississippi Choctaw group wearing traditional garb, c. 1908.

The colorful dresses worn by many Choctaw today are handmade and based on ancestral designs that adapted 19th-century European-American styles to local needs. While such traditional clothing is now most commonly worn for special occasions, many Choctaw elders—particularly women—continue to wear traditional garments in their daily lives. Choctaw dresses are often decorated with full-diamond, half-diamond, circular, and cross motifs that represent stickball sticks.

=== Indigenous games ===
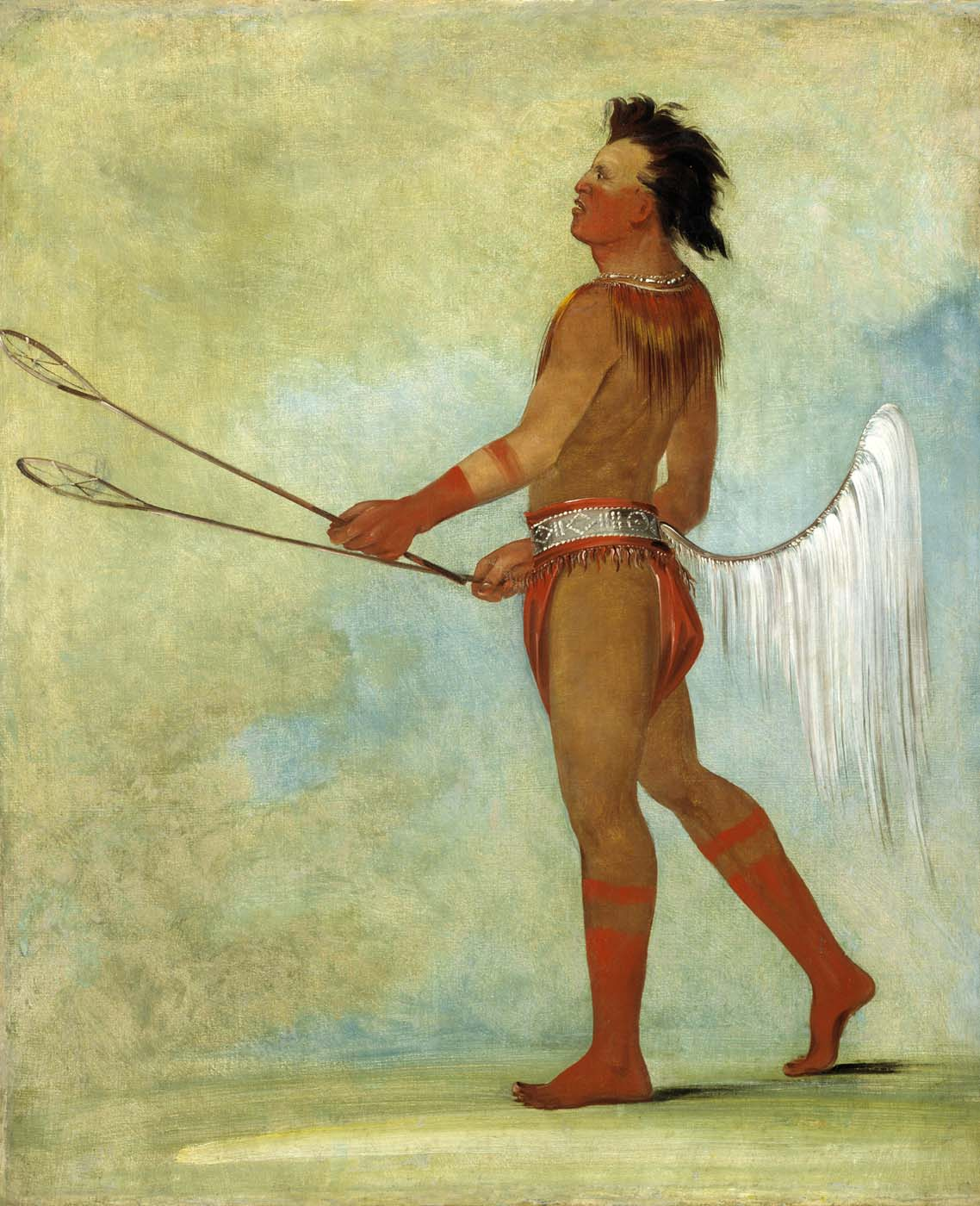
Tul-lock-chísh-ko, Drinks the Juice of the Stone, in Ball-player's Dress, portrait by George Catlin, 1834

Choctaw stickball, the oldest field sport in North America, was also known as the "little brother of war" because of its physical intensity and its role as a substitute for warfare. When disputes arose between Choctaw communities, stickball provided a structured and non-lethal means of resolving conflicts. Games could involve as few as twenty or as many as 300 players. Goal posts might be placed anywhere from a few hundred feet apart to several miles, and in some cases were located within each opposing team's village. A Jesuit priest referenced the game in 1729, and it was later depicted by George Catlin in his artwork. The Mississippi and Oklahoma Bands of Choctaw Indians continue to practice the sport.

Chunkey was a game played using a disk-shaped stone measuring approximately 1–2 inches in diameter. Players rolled the disk down a 200-foot (61 m) corridor at high speed while throwing wooden shafts at it. The objective was either to strike the disk or to prevent opponents from hitting it.

Other traditional games involved the use of corn, cane, and moccasins. The corn game used five to seven kernels, with one side blackened and the other white. Players scored one point for the black side and five to seven points for the white side. The game was typically played by two participants.

== History ==
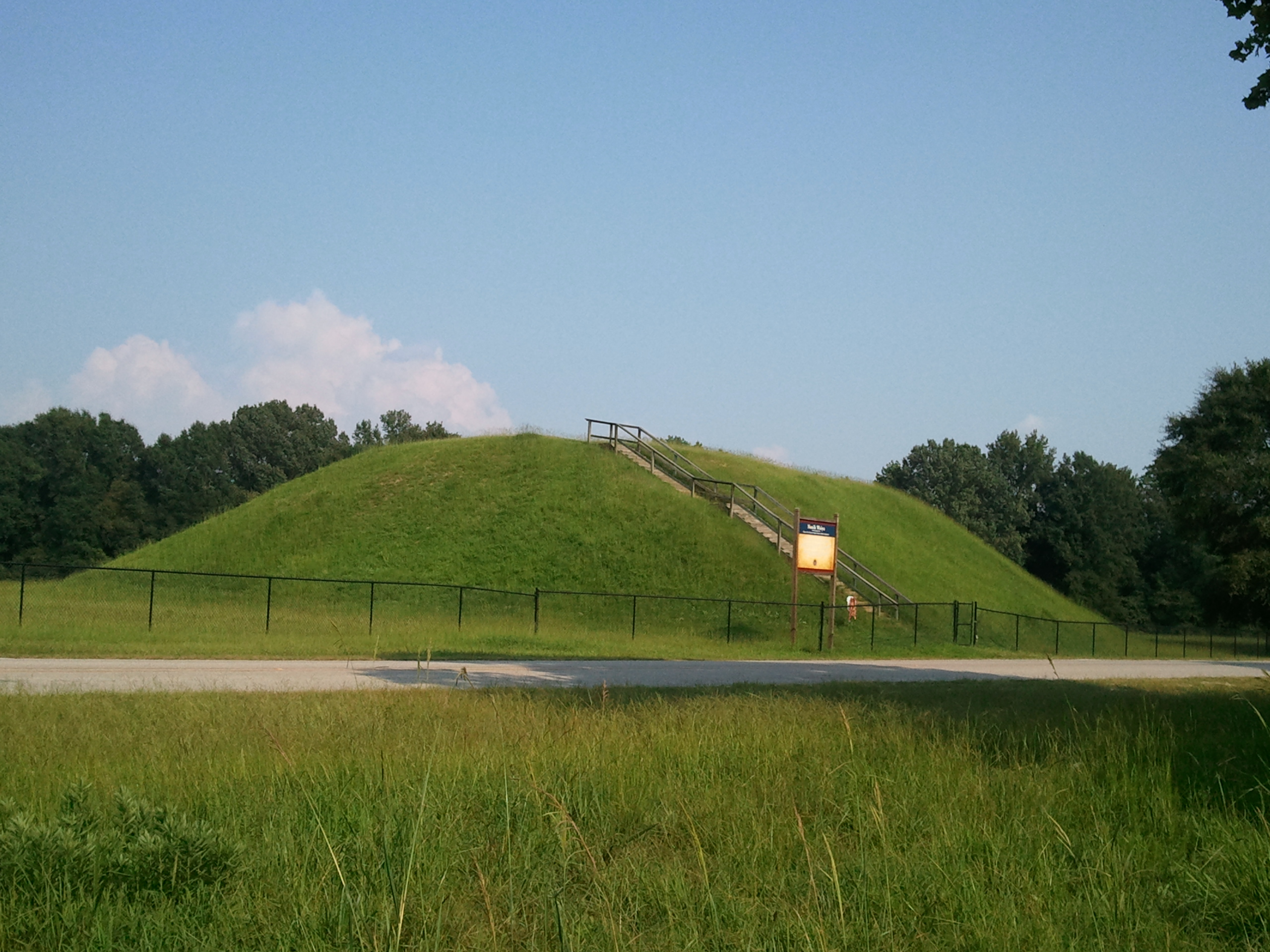
Nanih Waiya, "leaning mountain", mother mound for the Choctaw people

The Choctaw coalesced as a distinct people during the 16th century and had developed at least three major political and geographic divisions prior to European contact: the western Okla Falaya ("Long People"), the eastern Okla Tannap ("People on the Other Side"), and the southern Okla Hannali ("Six Towns People"). Over time, these divisions formed separate alliances with neighboring European powers.

The Choctaw were first documented by Europeans in French written records of the 17th century. Earlier encounters occurred in the mid-16th century, when Spanish explorers in the Southeast encountered ancestral Mississippian culture villages and leaders. By the colonial period, Spanish, French, and English explorers, governments, and settlers recognized the Choctaw as a complex society with established political institutions, alliances, religious practices, and cultural traditions.

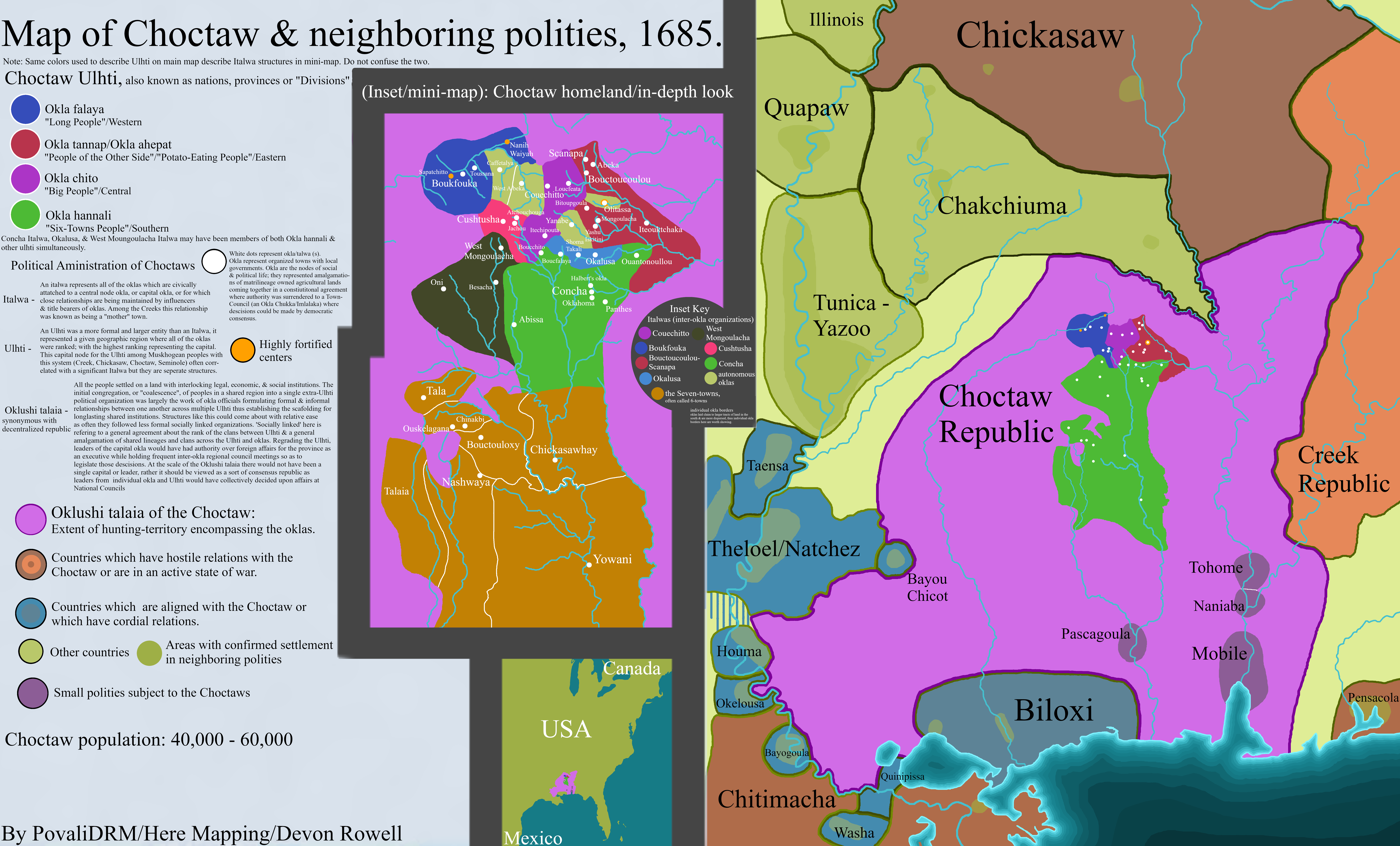
Map of the internal and immediate external political situation of the Choctaw Nation in 1685

Early contact with Europeans included sustained interactions with the French along the Gulf Coast and in Louisiana, the English in the Southeast, and Spain in Florida and Louisiana. These relationships introduced the Choctaw to expanded trade networks and formal diplomatic relations with European governments. Such interactions played a significant role in shaping the modern Choctaw people. Following the formation of the United States and increasing American settlement in the Southeast, the Choctaw became one of the Five Civilized Tribes, adopting aspects of European-American culture. Many Choctaw transitioned to yeoman farming and incorporated European Americans and African Americans into their society as tribal members, prisoners, and enslaved people.

Most Choctaw allied with the Americans during the American Revolution, the War of 1812, and the Red Stick War, most notably at the Battle of New Orleans. European Americans categorized the Choctaw as one of the "Five Civilized Tribes" of the Southeast. The Choctaw and the United States entered into nine treaties, the final three of which resulted in substantial land cessions in the Southeast. As part of Indian Removal, and despite not having waged war against the United States, the majority of Choctaw were forcibly relocated to Indian Territory between 1831 and 1833. In Indian Territory, the Choctaw government preserved the tri-division structure of their homeland by organizing into three districts. Each district had its own chief, who, together with town chiefs, served on the Choctaw National Council.

Choctaw individuals who chose to remain in Mississippi were recognized as state and U.S. citizens, making them among the earliest non-European ethnic groups granted such status. Article 14 of the 1830 Treaty of Dancing Rabbit Creek provided a pathway for Choctaw individuals to become U.S. citizens while retaining land holdings consolidated under Article I of previous treaties.

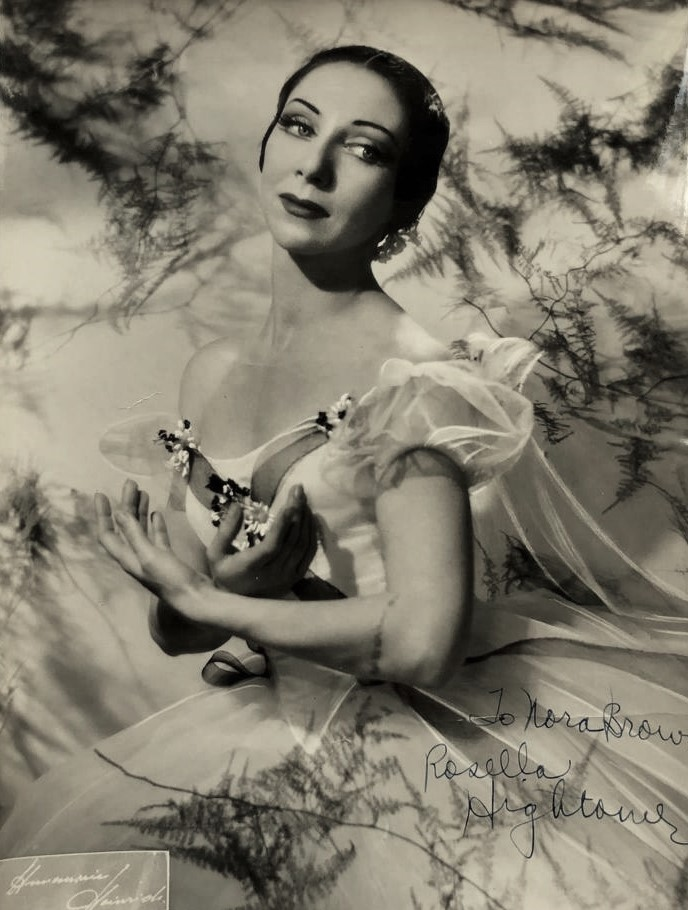
Rosella Hightower (1920–2008), Choctaw Nation of Oklahoma prima ballerina

During the American Civil War, Choctaw communities in both Indian Territory and Mississippi largely sided with the Confederate States of America. In the late 19th century, the Dawes Act and Curtis Act dismantled tribal landholdings and dissolved tribal governments in Indian Territory, as part of federal efforts to extinguish Indigenous land claims prior to Oklahoma statehood in 1907. For several decades thereafter, the United States Bureau of Indian Affairs appointed chiefs for the Choctaw and other tribes in the former Indian Territory.

During World War I, Choctaw soldiers served in the U.S. military as some of the first Native American codetalkers, using the Choctaw language for secure communications. Since the passage of the Indian Reorganization Act of 1934, Choctaw communities in multiple regions have reconstituted their governments and regained federal recognition. The largest of these is the Choctaw Nation of Oklahoma, followed by the Mississippi Band of Choctaw Indians and the Jena Band of Choctaw Indians.

In the 20th century, the Mississippi Band of Choctaw Indians received federal recognition in 1945, the Choctaw Nation of Oklahoma in 1971, and the Jena Band of Choctaw Indians in 1995. The Choctaw Apache Tribe of Ebarb, Clifton Choctaw Band, and Louisiana Band of Choctaw were state-recognized in Louisiana in 1978. The MOWA Band of Choctaw Indians was state-recognized by the Alabama legislature in 1979, and again in 1984 with the establishment of the Alabama Indian Commission under Alabama Code 41-9-708.

=== Treaties ===
Land was the most valuable asset for Native American societies and was held in collective stewardship. The United States systematically acquired Choctaw lands for European-American settlement through a combination of treaties, legislation, and threats of warfare. Although the Choctaw Nation entered into treaties with Great Britain, France, Spain, and the Confederate States of America, it signed only nine treaties with the United States. Some treaties negotiated by the United States with other nations, such as the Treaty of San Lorenzo, also indirectly affected the Choctaw.

=== Population history ===
The highest early population estimate was made by Le Page du Pratz, who estimated the Choctaw at 25,000 warriors in 1718, implying a total population of approximately 125,000 people. Other contemporary estimates were generally lower and may have represented only portions of the nation. St. Denis estimated 18,000 warriors (about 90,000 people) in 1714, while W. Bull estimated 16,000 warriors (approximately 80,000 people) in 1738. According to B. R. Carroll, French observers regarded the Choctaw as the most numerous Indigenous nation in North America, consisting of many thousands of men.

John R. Swanton documented 102 Choctaw villages and towns in his ethnographic work. In 1775, Robert Rogers estimated the Choctaw population at 10,000 warriors, suggesting a total population of about 50,000. Gilbert Imlay estimated approximately 6,000 warriors around 1800, or roughly 30,000 people, while Jedidiah Morse estimated the Choctaw population at 25,000 in about 1820.

A census taken in 1830, shortly before the forced removal, reported a total Choctaw population of 19,554. A report from the Commissioner of Indian Affairs dated November 25, 1841, indicated that 15,177 Choctaws had already relocated to Indian Territory. Several thousand more emigrated westward in subsequent years. In 1856, the Indian Office reported 22,707 Choctaws, and Emmanuel Domenech estimated the population at up to 25,000 around 1860.

An enumeration published in 1886 counted 18,000 Choctaws in Oklahoma as of 1884. The 1910 census recorded 15,917 Choctaws. Between 1916 and 1919, Oklahoma was home to 17,488 Choctaws by blood, 1,651 by intermarriage, and 6,029 Freedmen, in addition to 3,099 Mississippi Choctaws and approximately 200 Choctaws residing elsewhere.

In the 20th and 21st centuries, Choctaw population rebounded significantly. According to the 2018 American Community Survey, 254,154 people have Choctaw ancestry, including 90,973 residing in Oklahoma. In the 2010 United States census 103,910 people reported being full-blood Choctaw (in addition 6,398 more people reported being full-blood Native, but tribally mixed, with partially Choctaw ancestry) and according to the 2020 United States census there are at least 104,427 full-blood Choctaws.

== Tribes and organizations ==
There are three federally recognized Choctaw tribes, each of which has an Indian Reservation. They are:

- Choctaw Nation of Oklahoma, Oklahoma
- Mississippi Band of Choctaw Indians, Mississippi
- Jena Band of Choctaw Indians, Louisiana

In addition, the Yowani Choctaw are recognized as a distinct Choctaw people through their enrollment as a constituent people and citizens of the Caddo Nation, a federally recognized tribal confederacy. Yowani Choctaw are also enrolled as citizens of the Choctaw Nation of Oklahoma and the Mississippi Band of Choctaw Indians.

Several state-recognized tribes identify as being of Choctaw descent. These include:

MOWA Band of Choctaw Indians, Alabama Choctaw-Apache Community of Ebarb, Louisiana Clifton Choctaw Tribe of Louisiana, Louisiana Grand Caillou/Dulac Band, Louisiana Isle de Jean Charles Band, Louisiana Louisiana Choctaw Tribe, Louisiana Pointe-au-Chien Indian Tribe, Louisiana

Many organizations that self-identify as Native American tribes also claim Choctaw ancestry.

== Historical leaders ==
- Tuscaloosa (died October 1540) led resistance against Hernando de Soto at the Battle of Mabila. The battle is regarded as the first major armed conflict in North America between Indigenous peoples and Europeans.
- Franchimastabe (died 19th century) was a transitional leader and a contemporary of Taboca. To some American observers, he was regarded as the "leading chief of the Choctaws". He led a war party allied with British forces against American rebels and later attended treaty negotiations in 1801 near Mobile, Alabama.
- Taboca (died 19th century) was a traditional "prophet-chief" who led a Choctaw delegation beginning in October 1785 to Hopewell, South Carolina.
- Apuckshunubbee (c. 1740–1824) was chief of the Okla Falaya ("Tall People") district of the old Choctaw Nation. He died in Kentucky while traveling to Washington, D.C., where he was to participate in treaty negotiations.
- Pushmataha (Apushmataha) (1760s–December 24, 1824) was a chief of the old Choctaw Nation. He negotiated multiple treaties with the United States and fought on the American side during the War of 1812. He died in Washington, D.C., and is buried in Congressional Cemetery.
- Moshulatubbee (1770–1836) was a chief of the Choctaw Nation both before and after removal. He traveled to Washington City in 1824 to negotiate on behalf of the tribe and was the only major Choctaw leader to return. In the summer of 1830, he ran for a seat in the United States Congress to represent the state of Mississippi.
- Yowannee Mingo (c. 1740) was a chief of Yowani Choctaw before removal.
- Greenwood LeFlore (June 3, 1800 – August 31, 1865) was a district chief of the Choctaws in Mississippi and later served as an influential state representative and senator in Mississippi.
- George W. Harkins (1810–1890) was a district Choctaw chief in Indian Territory from 1850 to 1857 and the author of the "Farewell Letter to the American People" prior to the American Civil War.
- Peter Pitchlynn (January 30, 1806 – January 17, 1881) was a highly influential Choctaw leader during the removal era and afterward. He represented the Choctaws in Washington, D.C., for several years and is buried in Congressional Cemetery. Charles Dickens described him as "as stately and complete a gentleman of nature's making as ever I beheld."
- Wesley Johnson (c. 1849–1925) was elected chief on May 10, 1913, in Meridian, Mississippi. He led delegations of Mississippi, Alabama, and Louisiana Choctaws to Washington, D.C., in February 1914, where he met Woodrow Wilson and members of Congress to present the conditions faced by the Mississippi Choctaws. He represented the Alabama delegation from southwest Alabama in Mobile and Washington Counties and was also known as Wesley Wakatubee.
- Phillip Martin (March 13, 1926 – February 4, 2010) served as chief of the Mississippi Band of Choctaw Indians from 1979 to 2007 and worked in tribal government for more than fifty years. During his tenure, he promoted economic development, encouraged outside investment, and reduced unemployment on the reservation to near zero.

== See also ==
- William Bartram
- Chacato
- Choctaw culture
- Choctaw mythology
- Choctaw Trail of Tears
- Cyrus Byington
- Gideon Lincecum
- Steven Charleston
- List of Choctaw Treaties
- List of sites and peoples visited by the Hernando de Soto Expedition
- okay ("okeh", etymology)
- Bulbancha

== Bibliography ==
- Patricia Galloway and Clara Sue Kidwell. "Choctaw in the East". In Handbook of North American Indians: Vol. 14, Southeast. Raymond D. Fogelson, volume editor. Washington, DC: Smithsonian Institution, 2004: 499–519.
- Gallay, Alan (2002). The Indian Slave Trade: The Rise of the English Empire in the American South, 1670–1717. Yale University Press. ISBN 978-0-300-10193-5.
- Akers, Donna L. Living in the Land of Death: The Choctaw Nation, 1830–1860, Lansing: Michigan State University, 2004.
- Barnett Jr., James F. Mississippi's American Indians. Jackson, MS: University Press of Mississippi, 2012.
- Bartram, William. Travels Through...Country of the Chactaws..., Florida: printed by James & Johnson, 1791.
- Belue, Ted F. (1996). The Long Hunt: Death of the Buffalo East of the Mississippi. Stackpole Books. ISBN 978-0-8117-0968-2.
- Bushnell, David I. Smithsonian Institution Bureau of American Ethnology Bulletin 48: The Choctaw of Bayou Lacomb, St. Tammany Parish, Louisiana. Washington, DC: Government Printing Office, 1909.
- Byington, Cyrus. Smithsonian Institution Bureau of American Ethnology Bulletin 46: A Dictionary of the Choctaw Language. Washington, DC: Government Printing Office, 1915.
- Carson, James Taylor. Searching for the Bright Path: The Mississippi Choctaws from Prehistory to Removal. Lincoln: University of Nebraska Press, 1999.
- Cushman, Horatio Bardwell (1999) [1962]. Debo, Angie (ed.). The History of the Choctaw, Chickasaw, and Natchez Indians. University of Oklahoma Press. ISBN 978-0-8061-3127-6.
- Galloway, Patricia (February 1, 1998). Choctaw Genesis, 1500–1700: 1500–1700. University of Nebraska Press. ISBN 978-0-8032-7070-1.
- Haag, Marcia and Henry Willis. Choctaw Language & Culture: Chahta Anumpa. Norman, OK: University of Oklahoma Press, 2001.
- Hurley, Patrick J.(1883). National Atty. for Choctaw Nation "Choctaw Citizenship Litigation.
- Jimmie, Randy and Jimmie, Leonard. NANIH WAIYA Magazine, 1974, Vol I, Number 3.
- Kidwell, Clara Sue. Choctaws and Missionaries in Mississippi, 1818–1918. University of Oklahoma Press: Norman and London, 1995.
- Kidwell, Clara Sue. The Choctaws in Oklahoma: From Tribe to Nation, 1855–1970 2007.
- Lambert, Valerie. Choctaw Nation: A Story of American Indian Resurgence. U. of Nebraska Press, 2007.
- Lincecum, Gideon. Pushmataha: A Choctaw Leader and His People. Tuscaloosa: University of Alabama Press, 2004.
- Lincecum, Gideon. Traditional History of the Chahta Nation, Translated from the Chahta by Gideon Lincecum, 1861. University of Texas Library, March 1932.
- Mihesuah, Devon Abbott (2009). Choctaw Crime and Punishment, 1884–1907. Norman, OK: University of Oklahoma Press. ISBN 978-0-8061-4052-0.
- Morrison, James D. (1987). The Social History of the Choctaw Nation, 1865–1907. Durant, OK: Creative Informatics, Inc. OCLC 755290614.
- Mould, Tom (2004). Choctaw Tales. University Press of Mississippi. ISBN 978-1-57806-683-4.
- O'Brien, Greg. Choctaws in a Revolutionary Age, 1750–1830. Lincoln: University of Nebraska Press, 2002.
- O'Brien, Greg, ed. Pre-removal Choctaw History: Exploring New Paths. Norman, OK: University of Oklahoma Press, 2008.
- O'Brien, Greg. "Mushulatubbee and Choctaw Removal: Chiefs Confront a Changing World". 2001.
- O'Brien, Greg. "Pushmataha: Choctaw Warrior, Diplomat, and Chief." 2001.
- Pesantubbee, Michelene E. Choctaw Women in a Chaotic World: The Clash of Cultures in the Colonial Southeast. Albuquerque, NM: University of New Mexico, 2005.
- Swanton, John (1998) [1922]. Early History of the Creek Indians and Their Neighbors. University Press of Florida. ISBN 978-0-8130-1635-1.
- Swanton, John (2001). Source Material for the Social and Ceremonial Life of the Choctaw Indians. University Alabama Press. ISBN 978-0-8173-1109-4.
- Wells, Samuel J., and Tubby, Roseanna (Editors). After Removal, The Choctaw in Mississippi. Jackson and London: University Press of Mississippi, 1986. ISBN 0-87805-289-5.
- Wilson, Gustavus James Nash (2013) [1914]. The Early History of Jackson County, Georgia: ... HardPress. ISBN 978-1-314-81902-1.
- Mississippi Choctaw Reservation and Off-Reservation Trust Land, Mississippi United States Census Bureau
