= Mushulatubbee =

Choctaw Native American chief (1765–1838)

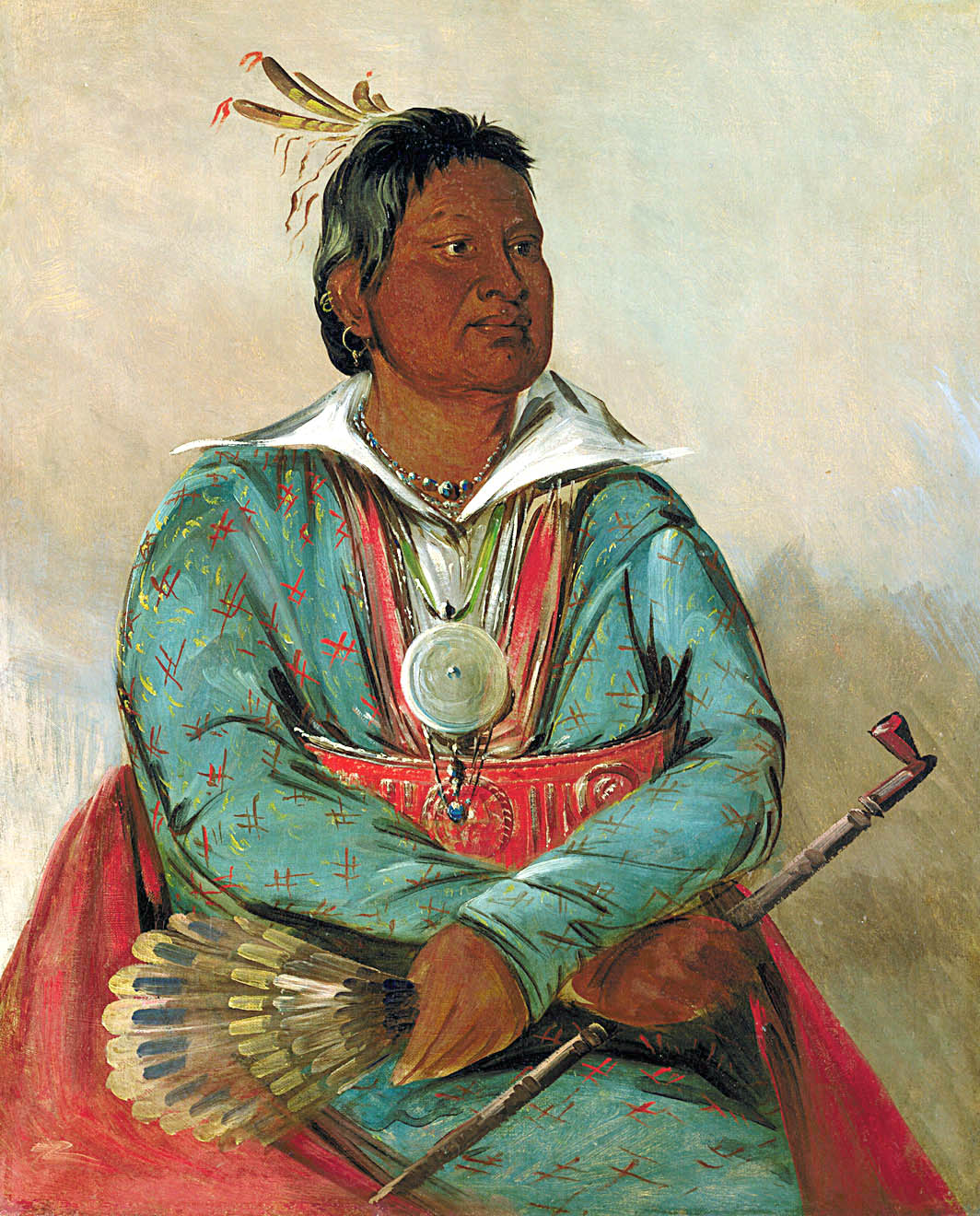
- Mosholatubbee, painted by George Catlin

Choctaw leader
- In office 1815–1838
- Preceded by: Hoomastubbee
- Succeeded by: David Folsom

Personal details
- Born: c. 1765 Old Choctaw Nation (present-day Mississippi)
- Died: August 30, 1838 (aged 72–73) Arkansas, U.S.
- Cause of death: Smallpox
- Parent: Homastubbee
- Known for: Tribal chief

Mushulatubbee (Choctaw Amoshulit Ʋbi, "Determined to Kill") (born c. 1765, died 1838) was the chief of the Choctaw Okla Tannap, one of the three major Choctaw divisions during the early 19th century. He led his warriors to assist General Andrew Jackson in the war against the Creek Red Sticks, known as the Creek Wars.

He also was influential in getting treaties signed with the federal government, and resisting settler encroachment on Choctaw lands. When Principal Chief Greenwood LeFlore stayed in Mississippi at the time of removal, Mushulatubbee was elected as principal chief, leading the tribe to Indian Territory.

== Warriorship ==
Other spellings for his name include: Mosholetvbbi, AmoshuliTvbi, Musholatubbee, Moshaleh Tubbee, and Mushulatubba.

The Shawnee leader Tecumseh visited Mushulatubbee in 1811 when he travelled south to gain indigenous support for his confederacy, in an effort to resist the expansion of the United States onto Native lands. Tecumseh met Mushulatubbee, then the chief of the Okla Tannap, the northern region of the three major Choctaw areas of settlement, in the village of Mashulaville. Mushulatubbee sympathized with Tecumseh's cause, but felt he was too old to assist the confederacy, so remained neutral in the ongoing war between the U.S. and Tecumseh.

From 1813 to 1814, Mushulatubbee fought in the Creek War alongside the United States against the Red Sticks, a Muscogee faction attempting to resist U.S. expansion in the American South. A year later, Mushulatubbee again fought alongside the U.S. against British forces during the War of 1812. During the Battle of New Orleans in 1815, Mushulatubbee led 52 Choctaw warriors against British pickets which had been established in local bayous, killing several soldiers and demoralizing others. After the battle concluded in an American victory, Mushulatubbee and his warriors returned home after officially announcing their departure on January 27, 1815 at Fort Stoddard.

== Land cessions ==
Under continuing pressure from European-American settlers and the United States government, Mushulatubbee signed the Treaty of Choctaw Trading House on 24 October 1816, and the Treaty Ground on 18 October 1820 to cede land. The US failed to prevent settlers from continuing to encroach on Choctaw territory.

== Journey to Washington ==
In 1824, Pushmataha, Mushulatubee, and Apuckshunubbee, the three chiefs of the Choctaw regional divisions, became concerned about the encroaching settlement of European Americans and the unwillingness of local authorities to respect Indian land titles. They still hoped to offset the government's push for removal west of the Mississippi River and resolved to take their case to the Federal government in Washington, D.C. Pushmataha led the delegation; they sought either expulsion of white settlers from deeded lands in Arkansas, or compensation in land and cash for such lands. The group also consisted of Talking Warrior, Red Fort, Nittahkachee, Col. Robert Cole and David Folsom, both (mixed-race) Choctaw; Captain Daniel McCurtain; and Major John Pitchlynn, the U.S. Interpreter.

They planned to travel the Natchez Trace to Nashville, then to Lexington, Kentucky; onward to Maysville, Kentucky; across the Ohio River (called the Spaylaywitheepi by the Shawnee) northward to Chillicothe, Ohio (former principal town of the Shawnee); then finally east over the "National Highway" to Washington City.

Apuckshunubbee, age 80, died before they reached Washington, and Pushmataha died of smallpox in the capital soon after their meeting with the government.

While in Washington, the chief also met with the Marquis de Lafayette, who was visiting Washington, D.C. for the last time. He hailed him as a fellow aged warrior who, though foreign, rose to high renown in the American cause.

You are one of our fathers that fought in the War with Gen. George Washington. We take you here by the hand as a friend and a father. We have always walked in the white paths of peace; and in those paths we have traveled to visit you. We offer you pure hands, which have never been stained with the blood of Americans.-- We live in the south, where the sun shines hot upon us. We have been neighbors to the French, neighbors to the Spaniards, and neighbors to the English: but now our only neighbors are the Americans, in the midst of whom we live as friends and brothers.

— Mushulatubbe, The Essex Register , 2 December 1824.

== Address to Congress ==
In February 1825, Mushulatubbee delivered a message to Congress, expressing his hope that, now as sedintary farmers and as Christians, the rights of the Choctaw people would be respected.

We have heard that, from a small beginning, you'have grown to be a great and pow erful people; and that, as you advanced, we receded; as you flourished, we decayed. We have been tempted to ask, Why should this be so? Has the Great Spirit frowned upon his red children, that they should thus have withered in your presence? Yet we have been told from the Good Book, that He loves all His Children alike; and that His greatest attribute is that of infinite mercy. This we are most willing to believe; and, believing, we are led to the natural conclusion, that for some great end, only known to Himself, He has permitted us to melt before you; but that the time must come, when His interposing hand will he outstretched in our behalf, and we be made to become like white men. We rejoice to think that that period is approaching...You have institutions to promote and disseminate the knowledge of every branch ot science: you have a government, and you have laws, all founded upon those principles of liberty and equality which have ever been dear to us. For. in all our vicissitudesof fortune, we have never been the slaves of anv power; and we trust in the Great Spirit, we never shall be. The theory of your Government is; justice and good faith to all men. You will not submit to in jury from one party because it is powerful; nor will you oppress another because it is weak.

— Mushulatubbe, Address from The Choctaw Delegation of Indians, In Washington, Relative to their condition in common with other Tribes, 25 February 1825.

== Candidate for U.S. Congress ==
In 1830 Mushulatubbee announced his candidacy for office in Mississippi in the Port Gibson Correspondent, as reported by the Christian Mirror and N.H. Observer (15 July 1830).

To the voters of Mississippi. Fellow Citizens:-I have fought for you, I have been by your own act, made a citizen of your state; ... According to your laws I am an American citizen, ... I have always battled on the side of this republic ... I have been told by my white brethren, that the pen of history is impartial, and that in after years, our forlorn kindred will have justice and 'mercy too'.

— Mushulatubbee, Christian Mirror and N.H. Observer, July 1830.

== Removal and death ==
On 26 September 1830, together with the Principal Chief Greenwood LeFlore, Nitakechi, and others, Mushulatubbee signed the Treaty of Dancing Rabbit Creek, which ceded to the US government most of the remaining Choctaw territory in Mississippi and Alabama in exchange for lands in Indian Territory. Over the next decade, the US government forced the Choctaw to remove west of the Mississippi River, although LeFlore was deposed in a coup by his nephew, George W. Harkins, and chose to remain in Mississippi.

Mushulatubbee remained the chief of his division during the removal and for a time after their resettlement in what became Oklahoma. The government had encouraged the Choctaw to resettle in their former clan divisions. However, relocation soon led to changes in the society in which those clan divisions became less important. He was a slave owner and a farmer, and also pushed the Choctaw towards a market economy.

Mushulatubbee died of smallpox in 1838, in present-day Arkansas, and was buried near Kʋlih Chaha in Le Flore County, Oklahoma.

== See also ==
- Greenwood LeFlore
- List of Choctaw chiefs
