= George W. Harkins =

Attorney & Chief for the Choctaw Tribe & Indian Removal

Chief of the Choctaw Nation
- In office February 24, 1831 – November 6, 1834
- Preceded by: Greenwood Leflore
- Succeeded by: Thomas LeFlore

Chief of the Apukshunnubbee District
- In office 1850–1857
- Preceded by: Thomas LeFlore
- Succeeded by: Position abolished Alfred Wade (as Chief)

Personal details
- Born: 1810, exact date unknown Choctaw Nation, present day Mississippi
- Died: October 23, 1861 (aged 50–51) Fort Towson, Choctaw Nation, Indian Territory
- Spouse: Lily Folsom (m. 1830; died 1855)
- Children: 13
- Parent(s): Willis J. Harkins; Louisa Leflore
- Education: Centre College; Cumberland School of Law
- Occupation: Lawyer, statesman, tribal chief

George Washington Harkins (1810 – October 23, 1861) was an attorney and prominent chief of the Choctaw tribe during Indian removal.

Elected as principal chief after the national council deposed his maternal uncle, Greenwood LeFlore, Harkins was elected judge of the Red River District in Indian Territory in 1834. In 1850, he was chosen as chief of the Apukshunnubbee District (one of three) of the Choctaw Nation and served until 1857.

== Early life and education ==
Harkins was born into a high-status Choctaw clan through his mother, Louisa "Lusony" LeFlore. His father was Willis J Harkins. His oldest maternal uncle, traditionally the most important mentor to a boy child, was Greenwood LeFlore, the chief of the Choctaw. Harkins learned from both his cultures but identified as Choctaw first and foremost.

Harkins was educated at Centre College in Danville, Kentucky. He earned a law degree from Cumberland University.

== Marriage and family ==
Harkins married Salina Gardner and Lily Folsom, Daughter of Chief David Folsom and Rhoda Nail. It is said that he also married Laris Narcissy Leflore and had two children, but no evidence of that has been found.

He had several children with them who survived to adulthood: Richard, Sarah, Catherine, Ellen, David Folsom "Dave" Harkins (1828 - 1879), Susan (b. 1830- ), Cornelia, Henry Clay Harkins (1833-1886), Loren (b. 1835- ), and Mary Jane Harkins (b. 1837- ). All belonged to their mother's clans and gained status in the tribe through them.

His brother Willis had a son, George Willis Harkins (1835-1890), who was known as "The Rawhide Orator". See Leaders and Leading Men of the Indian Territory (Chicago : American Publishers' Association, 1891), page 254.

== Career ==
In October 1830, the national council led a coup to depose Greenwood LeFlore as chief after he signed the treaty for removal. It proceeded to elect Harkins, who belonged to the same clan and was a nephew of LeFlore through his mother. In the Choctaw matrilineal system, the mother's clan was the one that was most important to a person's status. To proceed with Indian Removal, President Andrew Jackson refused to recognize Harkins's authority with the tribe.

After Indian Removal, Harkins rose in influence in the tribe. Following the creation of a new Choctaw Constitution in 1834, he was elected judge of the Red River District in Indian Territory. The council of chiefs of the Indian District elected him as principal chief of the District (one of three in the Choctaw Nation), where he served from 1850 to 1857.

The districts represented the longstanding geographic and political divisions that had existed in the tribe in the Southeast. Gradually, in Indian Territory, they became less important.

== Influence ==
Harkins' 1831 "Farewell Letter to the American People," denouncing the removal of the Choctaw, was widely published in American newspapers. It is still widely regarded as one of the most important documents of Native American history.

Harkins wrote in part:

"It is with considerable diffidence that I attempt to address the American people, knowing and feeling sensibly my incompetency; and believing that your highly and well improved minds would not be well entertained by the address of a Choctaw.... We were hedged in by two evils, and we chose that which we thought the least. Yet we could not recognize the right that the state of Mississippi had assumed, to legislate for us. Although the legislature of the state were qualified to make laws for their own citizens, that did not qualify them to become law makers to a people that were so dissimilar in manners and customs as the Choctaws are to the Mississippians. Admitting that they understood the people, could they remove that mountain of prejudice that has ever obstructed the streams of justice, and prevent their salutary influence from reaching my devoted countrymen. We as Choctaws rather chose to suffer and be free, than live under the degrading influence of laws, which our voice could not be heard in their formation.

Much as the state of Mississippi has wronged us, I cannot find in my heart any other sentiment than an ardent wish for her prosperity and happiness.

I could cheerfully hope, that those of another age and generation may not feel the effects of those oppressive measures that have been so illiberally dealt out to us; and that peace and happiness may be their reward. Amid the gloom and horrors of the present separation, we are cheered with a hope that ere long we shall reach our destined land, and that nothing short of the basest acts of treachery will ever be able to wrest it from us, and that we may live free. Although your ancestors won freedom on the field of danger and glory, our ancestors owned it as their birthright, and we have had to purchase it from you as the vilest slaves buy their freedom."

— -George W. Harkins, George W. Harkins to the American People

== See also ==
- Mosholatubbee
- Greenwood LeFlore
- Peter Pitchlynn
- Phillip Martin
- List of Choctaw Treaties
