= Rhoda Pitchlynn Howell =

Choctaw rancher and community leader (1814–1911)

- Pashuma
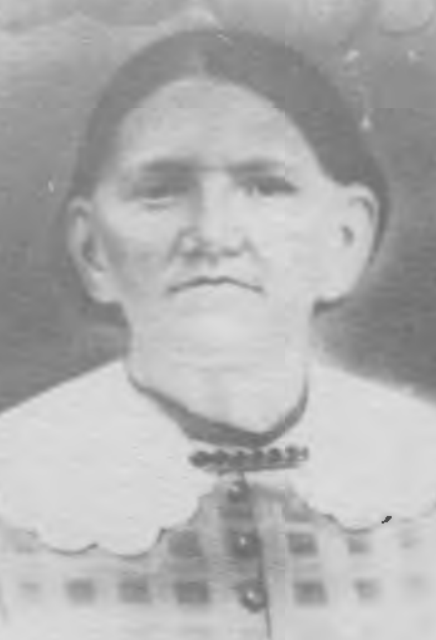
- Born: January 31, 1814; Choctaw Nation
- Died: February 27, 1911 (aged 97)
- Children: 14
- Father: John Pitchlynn
- Relatives: Peter Pitchlynn (brother)

Rhoda Pitchlynn Howell (Choctaw: Pashuma, lit. 'red-haired woman'; January 31, 1814 – February 27, 1911) was a Choctaw rancher and community leader who played a role in developing the agricultural and educational infrastructure in Indian Territory. After becoming widowed in 1865, she managed her family's farm and ranch near Fort Arbuckle and provided informal medical and psychological advice to her community, gaining widespread respect for her knowledge and leadership

== Early life ==
Rhoda Pitchlynn Howell was born on January 31, 1814, in the vicinity of Columbus, Mississippi, which was then a part of the Choctaw Nation. She was the daughter of John Pitchlynn and Sophia Folsom Pitchlynn, both prominent figures in the Choctaw Nation. Her brother, Peter Pitchlynn, was a well-known leader and representative of the Choctaw people in Washington, D.C. Her Choctaw language name was Pashuma, meaning "red-haired woman." Howell's early years were influenced by her family's active role in tribal leadership and education, particularly her brother's dedication to the welfare of the tribe and its education.

== Career ==
Howell married Calvin Howell, a doctor of Scotch-Irish descent, in the early 1830s. The couple relocated to Indian Territory during the 1830s and settled in Eagletown, near the border of Arkansas. Here, Calvin Howell established a cotton gin, and the family contributed to the development of the local community, transforming it from wilderness into a growing settlement. The community of Eagletown grew, with businesses, hotels, and mills being established, many supported by enslaved labor.

After the Civil War, Howell's life changed significantly. Her husband died in 1865, and she relocated with her remaining children to the Chickasaw Nation near Fort Arbuckle in 1866. At this new location, she became a rancher and farmer, managing the family's operations. During this time, she provided medical and psychological advice to those in the community, often in an informal capacity. Howell was noted for her knowledge, which many people in the region sought out.

Howell continued to be involved in her family's affairs and in the local community. She managed her family's ranch and played an active role in the upbringing of her children and grandchildren, some of whom went on to have careers in medicine, ranching, and other professions. Her son, Thomas P. Howell, became a doctor and also engaged in farming and ranching, continuing the family's agricultural tradition.

== Personal life ==
Howell was the mother of 14 children. After her husband's death, she moved her family and became an independent head of household. In the later years of her life, Howell experienced declining health. By the mid-1890s, she had lost her eyesight but remained in good health otherwise. She continued to manage her affairs despite being nearly blind for the last 14 to 15 years of her life. In 1909, at the age of 96, she visited her granddaughter and took her first ride in an automobile. Howell died on February 27, 1911, at the age of 97, following a brief illness from pneumonia. She was buried in the family cemetery located near Davis, Oklahoma.
