= Plymouth, Mississippi =

- Ghost town
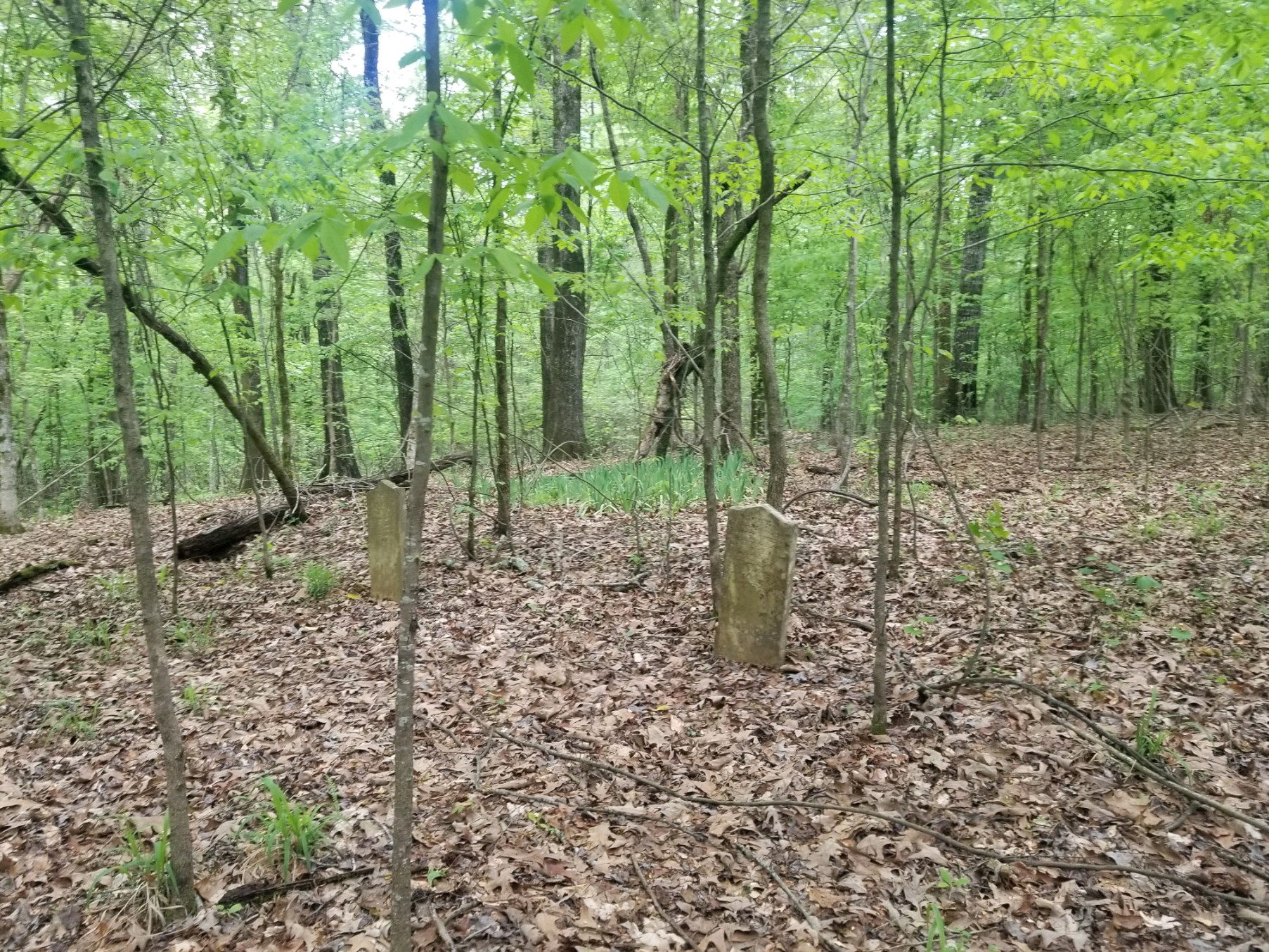
- Cemetery at Plymouth

- Location within Mississippi Location within the United States
- Coordinates: 33°31′23″N 88°30′06″W
- Country: United States
- State: Mississippi
- County: Lowndes
- Elevation: 210 ft (64 m)
- Time zone: UTC-6 (Central (CST))
  - Summer (DST): UTC-5 (CDT)
- GNIS feature ID: 710094

- Plymouth, Mississippi
- U.S. National Register of Historic Places
- Location within Mississippi Location within the United States
- Nearest city: Columbus, Mississippi
- Area: 210 acres (85 ha)
- NRHP reference No.: 80002288
- Added to NRHP: April 22, 1980

Plymouth was an early settlement in Mississippi in present-day Lowndes County. Plymouth was located on the west bank of the Tombigbee River at the mouth of Tibbee Creek.

== History ==
Local tradition holds that Hernando de Soto camped near the site Plymouth and Jean-Baptiste Le Moyne de Bienville erected a fort here in his campaign against the Chickasaw. The community of Plymouth was formed around 1819, developing around the fortified house of John Pitchlynn, the U.S. interpreter for the Choctaw Agency. Pitchlynn's home was surrounded by a stockade during the Creek War and was known as Fort Smith, in honor of Captain George Smith. Smith served under Colonel John McKee, who used Fort Smith as a base to carry out attacks on the Red Sticks who lived along the Black Warrior River.

Multiple stores and cotton warehouses were built in Plymouth. The low-lying site of the village was prone to repeated flooding. While both Plymouth and its sister town of Columbus across the river had high bluffs, Plymouth's landing site did not have easy access to the bluff heights.

The community was incorporated in 1836 and reached a peak population of 200. After incorporating, street grids were laid off into squares. By the 1840s, the village site was abandoned, as most of the residents had moved across the river to the better site of Columbus.

A post office operated under the name Plymouth from 1833 to 1855.

The Plymouth Academy operated in Plymouth from 1837 to 1866.

Today, the site of Plymouth is just west of John C. Stennis Lock and Dam on the Tennessee-Tombigbee Waterway. A 210-acre (85 ha) area was listed on the National Register of Historic Places in 1980. It includes a village site and a cemetery.

== Plymouth Bluff ==
Plymouth Bluff, just downstream of the village site, is now occupied by the Plymouth Bluff Environmental Center, operated by the Mississippi University for Women. It occupies land owned by the Army Corps of Engineers. The complex serves as the local center for ecological studies, as well as a retreat and conference center.

Multiple fossils have been found in the Bluffs, including a hadrosaur.
