= New Hope, Mississippi =

- Census-designated place
- Location of New Hope, Mississippi

- Location in the United States
- Coordinates: 33°26′48″N 88°19′30″W
- Country: United States
- State: Mississippi
- County: Lowndes

Area
  - Total: 5.04 sq mi (13.06 km^{2})
  - Land: 5.03 sq mi (13.03 km^{2})
  - Water: 0.0077 sq mi (0.02 km^{2})
- Elevation: 223 ft (68 m)

Population (2020)
  - Total: 3,161
  - Density: 628.2/sq mi (242.56/km^{2})
- Time zone: UTC-6 (Central (CST))
  - Summer (DST): UTC-5 (CDT)
- ZIP code: 39701
- Area code: 662
- FIPS code: 28-51400
- GNIS feature ID: 0674655

New Hope is a census-designated place (CDP) in Lowndes County, Mississippi, United States. As of the 2020 census, New Hope had a population of 3,161.

== Geography ==
New Hope is located in eastern Lowndes County at 33°26′48″N 88°19′30″W (33.446624, -88.324967). It is 8 miles (13 km) southeast of Columbus, the county seat, and 3 miles (5 km) west of the Alabama state line.

According to the United States Census Bureau, the CDP has a total area of 5.1 square miles (13.1 km^{2}), of which 0.01 square miles (0.02 km^{2}), or 0.18%, are water. Creeks draining the community flow west to the Tombigbee River.

== Demographics ==
Historical population
Census	Pop.	Note	%±
2000	1,964		—
2010	3,193		62.6%
2020	3,161		−1.0%
U.S. Decennial Census

=== 2020 census ===
New Hope Racial Composition
Race	Num.	Perc.
White	2,450	77.51%
Black or African American	565	17.87%
Native American	6	0.19%
Asian	12	0.38%
Pacific Islander	4	0.02%
Other/Mixed	80	2.53%
Hispanic or Latino	48	1.52%

As of the 2020 census, New Hope had a population of 3,161. The median age was 40.7 years. 24.4% of residents were under the age of 18 and 16.9% of residents were 65 years of age or older. For every 100 females there were 92.2 males, and for every 100 females age 18 and over there were 91.9 males age 18 and over.

0.0% of residents lived in urban areas, while 100.0% lived in rural areas.

There were 1,196 households in New Hope, of which 36.8% had children under the age of 18 living in them. Of all households, 58.5% were married-couple households, 14.4% were households with a male householder and no spouse or partner present, and 22.6% were households with a female householder and no spouse or partner present. About 19.8% of all households were made up of individuals and 9.8% had someone living alone who was 65 years of age or older.

There were 1,250 housing units, of which 4.3% were vacant. The homeowner vacancy rate was 0.5% and the rental vacancy rate was 9.1%.

=== 2010 census ===
As of the 2010 United States census, there were 3,193 people living in the CDP. 87.8% were White, 11.2% African American, 0.2% Native American, 0.2% Asian, 0.1% from some other race and 0.6% of two or more races. 1.0% were Hispanic or Latino of any race.

=== 2000 census ===
As of the census of 2000, there were 1,964 people, 669 households, and 576 families living in the CDP. The population density was 814.8 inhabitants per square mile (314.6/km^{2}). There were 695 housing units at an average density of 288.3 per square mile (111.3/km^{2}). The racial makeup of the CDP was 93.28% White, 5.96% African American, 0.10% Native American, 0.10% Asian, and 0.56% from two or more races. Hispanic or Latino of any race were 0.15% of the population.

There were 669 households, out of which 49.6% had children under the age of 18 living with them, 73.4% were married couples living together, 10.6% had a female householder with no husband present, and 13.9% were non-families. 11.8% of all households were made up of individuals, and 3.9% had someone living alone who was 65 years of age or older. The average household size was 2.93 and the average family size was 3.18.

In the CDP, the population was spread out, with 31.3% under the age of 18, 6.7% from 18 to 24, 31.9% from 25 to 44, 23.0% from 45 to 64, and 7.1% who were 65 years of age or older. The median age was 35 years. For every 100 females, there were 96.8 males. For every 100 females age 18 and over, there were 92.9 males.

The median income for a household in the CDP was $54,375, and the median income for a family was $60,909. Males had a median income of $40,089 versus $26,875 for females. The per capita income for the CDP was $25,153. About 4.4% of families and 5.5% of the population were below the poverty line, including 4.8% of those under age 18 and 13.4% of those age 65 or over.

== Education ==
The majority of the New Hope CDP is within the Lowndes County School District.

New Hope Schools are consolidated on one campus. New Hope elementary is split into two buildings, one housing grades K-2 and the other housing grades 3–5. New Hope Middle contains grades 6–8; while New Hope High School houses 9–12.

Sports championships began with the Lady Trojan basketball team with two state championships. The New Hope Lady Trojan Slowpitch softball team has won ten state championships, including six consecutive from 2000 to 2006. The Trojan baseball team has won five state championships with one being a perfect 43–0 record. New Hope High School has also won a Class 4A Golf Championship and in 2008 won the Boy's Class 4A Basketball Championship.

A small piece of the CDP is within the Columbus Municipal School District.

East Mississippi Community College is the designated community college for Lowndes County.
