= John McKee (politician) =

American politician (1771–1832)

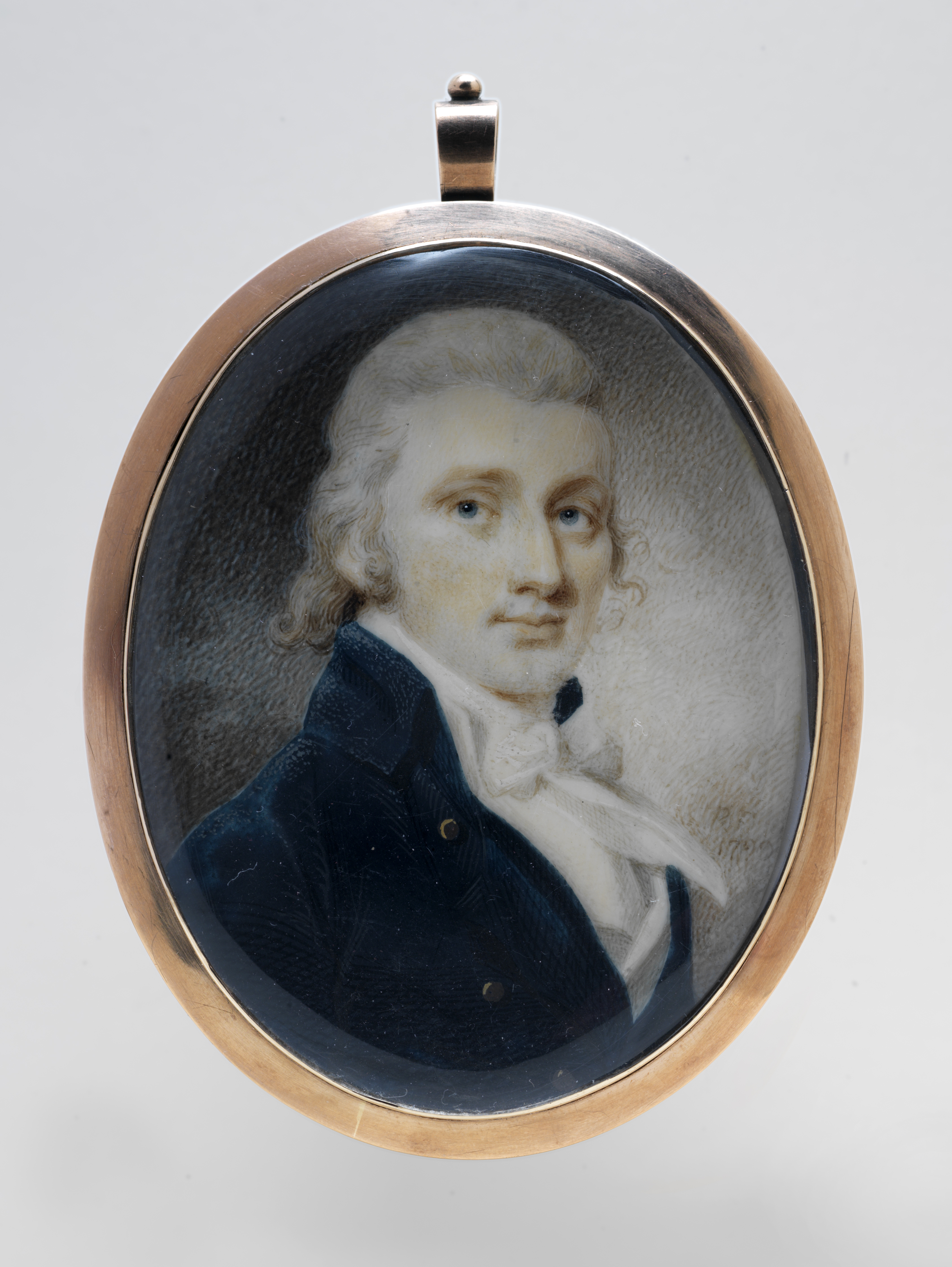

Member of the U.S. House of Representatives from Alabama's 2nd district
- In office March 4, 1823 – March 3, 1829
- Preceded by: District Established
- Succeeded by: R. E. B. Baylor

Personal details
- Born: John McKee; 1771 Rockbridge County, Virginia
- Died: August 12, 1832 (aged 60–61) Boligee, Alabama
- Party: Jackson Democratic-Republican, Jacksonian

John McKee (1771 – August 12, 1832) was an American politician active in the Southeastern United States. He served as agent to the Cherokees and Choctaws, and was the first Representative of Alabama's 2nd District from 1823 to 1829. He was also commissioned by President James Madison in 1811 to help wrest East and West Florida from Spanish control.

== Early life ==
McKee was born in Rockbridge County, Virginia (then part of Augusta County), and attended Liberty Hall Academy in Lexington. By 1792 McKee was in the Southwest Territory (which later became the State of Tennessee). He was appointed that year by territorial Governor William Blount to survey the boundary with the Cherokee nation established by the 1791 Treaty of Holston. McKee was sent on a peacekeeping mission to the Cherokees in 1793, and was temporarily appointed territorial agent for the Cherokees in 1794. In 1795, McKee became a lawyer, a lieutenant colonel in the militia, and clerk for Blount County, Southwest Territory. In 1797 McKee was sent by the United States government to meet with representatives of Panton, Leslie and Company in Pensacola, Florida, to discuss debts owed by the Choctaws to that company. McKee was appointed United States agent to the Choctaw nation in 1799, and served in that capacity until 1802. (Note: McKee may have been dismissed as agent to the Choctaws because of possible involvement in the Blount Conspiracy. J. C. A. Stagg notes that McKee is not named in accounts of the conspiracy, but that McKee was deeply involved in Blount's affairs.)

After his dismissal as agent to the Choctaws, John McKee served at times as representative to the Choctaws for John Forbes and Company (the successor to Panton, Leslie and Company). The Choctaws had large debts to Forbes, and McKee and Forbes believed that the only way the Choctaws could pay their debts was by selling their land to the United States. McKee continued to do business with Forbes even when he was employed by the United States government.

== Florida mission ==
In 1810 the westernmost districts of Spanish West Florida revolted and were soon annexed by the United States. Juan Vicente Folch y Jaun, governor of West Florida, feared that filibusterers would try to seize the rest of the province. In an attempt to prevent military intervention by the United States, in early December 1810 Folch offered to peaceably turn over Florida to the United States if he had not received reinforcements or instructions to not do so by the end of the year. John McKee was in Mobile, and was given a copy of Folch's offer to carry overland to Washington.

Shortly after John McKee reached Washington in January 1811, President James Madison decided to send George Mathews to negotiate the surrender of West Florida with Governor Folch, and to investigate means to detach East Florida from Spain so that it could be annexed by the United States. Late in January 1811, McKee was appointed to accompany Mathews on his mission to the Floridas. McKee and Mathews traveled to St. Marys, Georgia, just across the St. Marys River from East Florida, where Mathews determined that conditions for a revolt in East Florida were not ripe. McKee and Mathews then headed to Mobile to meet with Governor Folch. Folch had in the meantime rescinded his offer to surrender West Florida to the United States, having received money and orders from Veracruz. After further unsuccessful negotiations with Governor Folch, McKee went to Fort Stoddert (on the Mobile River) to watch events in West Florida, while Mathews returned to St. Marys to do the same for East Florida. Mathews sent McKee instructions about inciting rebellion in Mobile and Pensacola, in West Florida, but McKee's efforts were of a "halfhearted nature." McKee's commission to help acquire the Floridas for the United States was cancelled in early 1812.

== Later life ==
In 1813 John McKee was sent by Andrew Jackson to ensure that the Choctaws sided with the United States against the Creeks. McKee used John Pitchlynn's fort at Plymouth as a base of operations for excursions against Red Sticks who were on the Black Warrior River. He recruited Choctaws to fight against the Red Sticks in the Creek War (1813–1814), and personally led a contingent in one attack. McKee was re-appointed agent to the Choctaw nation in 1814, and recruited Choctaws and Chickasaws to fight with Andrew Jackson against the British. McKee was one of the agents who negotiated the Treaty of Fort St. Stephens with the Choctaw nation in 1816. McKee continued as agent to the Choctaw nation until 1821. He served as the registrar of the United States General Land Office in Tuscaloosa, Alabama, from 1821 to 1823.

John McKee was the first Representative of Alabama's 2nd District from 1823 to 1829. In 1824, McKee was sent to Tallahassee, Florida, to settle the location of the township granted to the Marquis de Lafayette by Congress. After leaving the House of Representatives in 1829, McKee was one of the men who negotiated the Treaty of Dancing Rabbit Creek with the Choctaw nation in 1830.

John McKee built a house in Boligee, Alabama in 1816, which remained his permanent home. McKee may have married a Chickasaw woman, with whom he had a son and daughter. He died at his home in Boligee in 1832.

== Sources ==
- Bunn, Mike; Williams, Clay (2010). Battle for the Southern Frontier: The Creek War and the War of 1812. Mount Pleasant, South Carolina: Arcadia Publishing. ISBN 9781625843814.
- Lewis, Herbert J. "Jim" (April 4, 2013). "John McKee". Encyclopedia of Alabama. Archived from the original on July 22, 2014.
- Stagg, J. C. A. (Winter 2007). "George Mathews and John McKee: Revolutionizing East Florida, Mobile, and Pensacola in 1812". The Florida Historical Quarterly. 85 (3): 269–296. JSTOR 30150062.
- Stagg, J. C. A. (2009). Borderlines in Borderlands: James Madison and the Spanish-American Frontier, 1776–1821. New Haven, Connecticut: Yale University Press. ISBN 978-0-300-13905-1.

U.S. House of Representatives
Preceded by District Established	Member of the U.S. House of Representatives from Alabama's 2nd District; March 4, 1823 – March 3, 1829	Succeeded by Robert Emmett Bledsoe Baylor
