= Derek Sherrod =

American football player (born 1989)

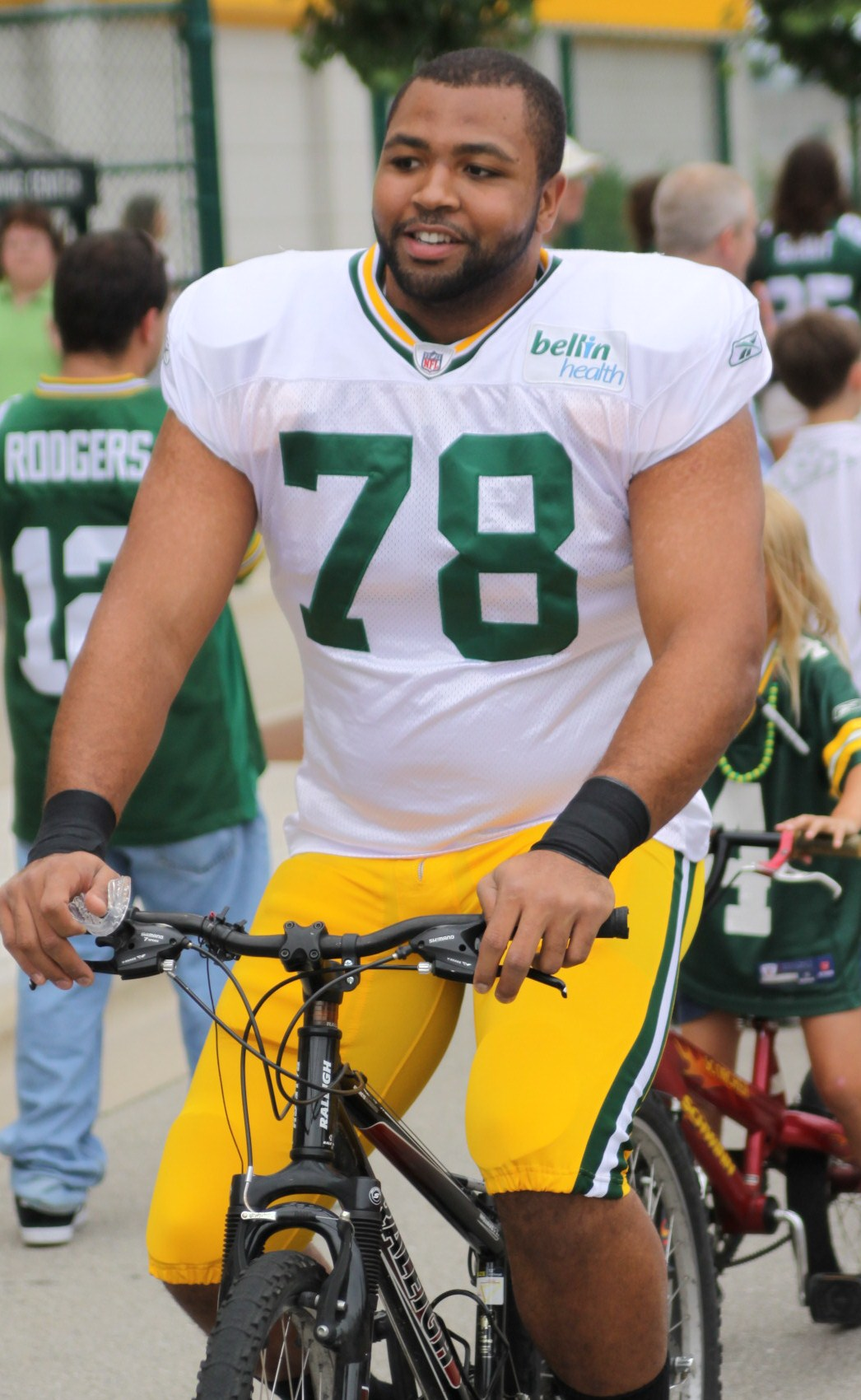
- Sherrod with the Green Bay Packers in 2011

No. 78
- Position: Offensive tackle

Personal information
- Born: April 23, 1989 (age 37); Chula Vista, California, U.S.
- Listed height: 6 ft 5 in (1.96 m)
- Listed weight: 321 lb (146 kg)

Career information
- High school: Caledonia (MS)
- College: Mississippi State (2007–2010)
- NFL draft: 2011: 1st round, 32nd overall pick

Career history
- Green Bay Packers (2011–2014); Kansas City Chiefs (2015)*
- * Offseason or practice squad member only

Awards and highlights
- Second-team All-American (2010); First-team All-SEC (2010); Second-team All-SEC (2009)

Career NFL statistics
- Games played: 20
- Games started: 1
- Stats at Pro Football Reference

Derek Lee Sherrod (born April 23, 1989) is an American former professional football player who was an offensive tackle in the National Football League (NFL). He was selected by the Green Bay Packers in the first round of the 2011 NFL draft. He played college football for the Mississippi State Bulldogs.

== Early life ==
Sherrod was born in Chula Vista, California. He attended Caledonia High School in Caledonia, Mississippi, where he played for the Caledonia Confederates high school football team. He was a four-year starter on the offensive line and three-year regular on the defensive side of the ball. He allowed just one quarterback sack during his senior season and was credited with 32 pancake blocks, while also making 79 tackles on defense, with six quarterback sacks and four fumble recoveries. Sherrod was a first-team All-State selection in Class 3A by the Mississippi Association of Coaches at offensive tackle.

Regarded as a four-star recruit, he was listed as the No. 13 offensive tackle prospect of the class of 2007. He chose Mississippi State University over Florida, Miami (Fla.), Notre Dame, Michigan, Louisville and Ole Miss.

== College career ==
In 2007, his true freshman year, Sherrod played in all but two games (11 of 13) during the regular season. He was teammates with his brother Dezmond in 2007. As a sophomore, he became a starter in the final 11 games for the Bulldogs at left tackle, after missing the season opener due to injury and not starting in Week 2.

In his junior season, Sherrod started all 12 games at left tackle and helped pave the way for Mississippi State to lead the Southeastern Conference in rushing, with running back Anthony Dixon recording 1,391 yards for the season (a new MSU single-season rushing record).

As a senior, he was a first-team All-SEC selection and helped the Bulldogs to a 9–4 record and a 52–14 victory over Michigan in the 2011 Gator Bowl.

== Professional career ==
Pre-draft measurables
Height	Weight	Arm length	Hand span	Wingspan	40-yard dash	10-yard split	20-yard split	20-yard shuttle	Three-cone drill	Vertical jump	Broad jump	Bench press
6 ft 5 3/8 in (1.97 m)	321 lb (146 kg)	35 3/8 in (0.90 m)	11 in (0.28 m)	6 ft 11 7/8 in (2.13 m)	5.27 s	1.84 s	3.06 s	4.63 s	7.43 s	28.0 in (0.71 m)	8 ft 1 in (2.46 m)	23 reps
All values from NFL Combine/Pro Day

=== Green Bay Packers ===
Sherrod was selected in the first round (32nd overall) of the 2011 NFL draft by the Green Bay Packers. He was the first Mississippi State Bulldog selected in the first round since Walt Harris and Eric Moulds in 1996.

Sherrod broke his right leg on December 18, 2011, when linebacker Tamba Hali rolled into him during the fourth quarter of the Packers' 19–14 loss to the Kansas City Chiefs. He missed the entire 2012 season recovering from the injury.

On August 20, 2013, Packers GM Ted Thompson stated he was confident Sherrod would play in the 2013 season. Sherrod started the 2013 on the PUP list. He was moved to the active roster on November 5, 2013.

Sherrod was waived on November 3, 2014.

=== Kansas City Chiefs ===
On December 31, 2014, the Kansas City Chiefs signed Sherrod to a future free agent contract. He was cut from the team on September 5, 2015, as the Chiefs reduced their roster to 53 players.

== Personal life ==
Sherrod graduated in August 2010 with a bachelor's degree in business with a focus on financial risk management, insurance and financial planning, with a 3.54 grade point average. He was a finalist for the NCAA's 2010 William V. Campbell Trophy, commonly called the "Academic Heisman."

His brother Dezmond also played football.
