= The Packet =

The Packet is the name of several newspapers.

- The Columbus Packet, published in Columbus, Mississippi, US
- The Falmouth Packet, published in Falmouth, Cornwall, UK
- Packet Newspapers, publishers of several newspapers based in Cornwall, UK
