= The Commercial Dispatch =

Daily newspaper in Columbus, Mississippi, United States

- Open eyes, open minds
- Type: Daily newspaper
- Editor: Peter Imes
- Headquarters: 516 Main Street Columbus, MS 39701
- ISSN: 0746-7729
- OCLC number: 427363404
- Website: cdispatch.com

The Commercial Dispatch is the daily newspaper of Columbus, Mississippi, United States. It was created from the merger of two older papers, the Commercial and the Dispatch, in the early 20th century. The first issue of the consolidated newspaper was published on March 12, 1922. The Dispatch is published six days a week (no edition is produced on Saturday) at the company's headquarters and printing takes place at a press owned by the Northeast Mississippi Daily Journal in nearby Tupelo, MS. The paper is a longtime family-owned business and community mainstay; it has been owned by four generations of the Imes family. The current editor and publisher is Peter Imes.

== History ==
=== Consolidation ===
Vinton Birney Imes Sr. first went to work for Percy W. Maer at The Columbus Dispatch in 1910. Following Maer's death, Imes left The Columbus Dispatch and bought The Columbus Commercial. The following year Imes, local attorney John Frierson and local dentist Dr. D.D. Griffin formed a partnership and purchased The Columbus Commercial from Maer's widow. Imes merged the two papers in 1922. A subscription was $3 per year for home delivery and $2 for delivery by mail. The paper was a bi-weekly publication.

=== Post-consolidation ===
In 1925 Imes moved the newspaper to its present location at 516 Main Street. The Commercial Dispatch became a daily paper in 1926.

Upon Imes's death on June 18, 1947, at the age of 58, his son, Vinton Birney Imes Jr. took over as editor and publisher. Birney Imes Jr. carried on as editor and publisher for nearly 50 years. His son, Birney Imes III assumed the leadership of the Dispatch in 1996 after the retirement of his father.

From 1956 to 2004, The Commercial Dispatch operated WCBI-TV, the CBS television affiliate for north Mississippi.

On June 8, 2009, The Commercial Dispatch began publishing The Starkville Dispatch, a daily edition of The Commercial Dispatch that focuses on Starkville, Mississippi. Both papers share the bulk of their content, including all advertising, but the local news pages in The Starkville Dispatch tend to focus on Starkville-specific content.

In January 2018, Peter Imes, the great-grandson of the first editor-publisher of The Commercial Dispatch, became the fourth man in the family to hold that title.

The paper was printed locally on a Goss Urbanite press until its final local printing run on December 30, 2025.

== Circulation ==
The daily circulation is approximately 14,000. In addition to the daily newspaper, the Dispatch maintains an online presence and publishes the quarterly magazine Catfish Alley.

The paper has no local competition in the daily market in Columbus, but does compete with a local weekly, the Columbus Packet, and two daily newspapers in its regional coverage area, the Starkville Daily News and the West Point Daily Times Leader. Subscriptions are currently $14.45 per month. Rack papers sell for $0.75 Monday through Friday and $1.25 on Saturday.
