= Caledonia, Mississippi =

- Town
- Location of Caledonia, Mississippi

- Location in the United States
- Coordinates: 33°40′58″N 88°19′28″W
- Country: United States
- State: Mississippi
- County: Lowndes

Area
  - Total: 2.83 sq mi (7.32 km^{2})
  - Land: 2.83 sq mi (7.32 km^{2})
  - Water: 0.0039 sq mi (0.01 km^{2})
- Elevation: 335 ft (102 m)

Population (2020)
  - Total: 1,135
  - Density: 401.8/sq mi (155.13/km^{2})
- Time zone: UTC-6 (Central (CST))
  - Summer (DST): UTC-5 (CDT)
- FIPS code: 28-10460
- GNIS feature ID: 667916
- Website: caledoniams.net

Caledonia is a town in Lowndes County, Mississippi, United States, northeast of Columbus. As of the 2020 census, Caledonia had a population of 1,135.

== History ==
Caledonia was first settled in the 1820s by settlers from Tennessee, Kentucky, Georgia, Alabama, North Carolina, and South Carolina. It was likely named after Caledonia, as many of the settlers were Scots-Irish. A post office first opened in Caledonia in December 1836 and operated under the name Ridgeway. By 1840, the community was home to a bank and hat factory. In 1900, the population of Caledonia was 201.

== Geography ==
According to the United States Census Bureau, the town has a total area of 2.8 square miles (7.3 km^{2}), of which 2.8 square miles (7.3 km^{2}) is land and 0.35% is water.

=== Climate ===
Climate data for Caledonia, Mississippi
Month	Jan	Feb	Mar	Apr	May	Jun	Jul	Aug	Sep	Oct	Nov	Dec	Year
Record high °F (°C)	81 (27)	88 (31)	91 (33)	93 (34)	97 (36)	104 (40)	105 (41)	105 (41)	102 (39)	93 (34)	86 (30)	82 (28)	105 (41)
Mean daily maximum °F (°C)	53 (12)	59 (15)	67 (19)	76 (24)	82 (28)	89 (32)	91 (33)	91 (33)	85 (29)	76 (24)	66 (19)	56 (13)	74 (23)
Mean daily minimum °F (°C)	34 (1)	38 (3)	45 (7)	53 (12)	61 (16)	68 (20)	71 (22)	70 (21)	64 (18)	52 (11)	43 (6)	37 (3)	53 (12)
Record low °F (°C)	−1 (−18)	5 (−15)	14 (−10)	28 (−2)	39 (4)	43 (6)	55 (13)	51 (11)	37 (3)	28 (−2)	15 (−9)	−1 (−18)	−1 (−18)
Source: The Weather Channel

== Demographics ==
Historical population
Census	Pop.	Note	%±
1880	145		—
1910	137		—
1920	139		1.5%
1930	169		21.6%
1940	240		42.0%
1950	252		5.0%
1960	289		14.7%
1970	245		−15.2%
1980	497		102.9%
1990	821		65.2%
2000	1,015		23.6%
2010	1,041		2.6%
2020	1,135		9.0%
U.S. Decennial Census

As of the 2010 United States census, there were 1,041 people living in the town. 92.7% were White, 4.0% African American, 0.3% Native American, 0.9% Asian, 0.2% Pacific Islander, 0.3% from some other race and 1.6% of two or more races. 2.4% were Hispanic or Latino of any race.

As of the census of 2000, there were 1,015 people, 365 households, and 287 families living in the town. The population density was 360.4 inhabitants per square mile (139.2/km^{2}). There were 395 housing units at an average density of 140.3 per square mile (54.2/km^{2}). The racial makeup of the town was 94.19% White. 3.94% African American, 0.10% Native American, 0.49% Asian, 0.30% from other races, and 0.99% from two or more races. Hispanic or Latino of any race were 1.18% of the population. In 2012, there were 1,030 people. In 2014, there were 1,041 people.

There were 365 households, out of which 41.9% had children under the age of 18 living with them, 62.7% were married couples living together, 10.1% had a female householder with no husband present, and 21.1% were non-families. 19.5% of all households were made up of individuals, and 8.5% had someone living alone who was 65 years of age or older. The average household size was 2.78 and the average family size was 3.17.

In the town, the population was spread out, with 30.3% under the age of 18, 8.7% from 18 to 24, 30.2% from 25 to 44, 22.5% from 45 to 64, and 8.3% who were 65 years of age or older. The median age was 34 years. For every 100 females, there were 97.5 males. For every 100 females age 18 and over, there were 89.0 males.

The median income for a household in the town was $41,071, and the median income for a family was $50,625. Males had a median income of $32,159 versus $22,051 for females. The per capita income for the town was $16,798. About 3.3% of families and 8.0% of the population were below the poverty line, including 9.6% of those under age 18 and 23.8% of those age 65 or over.

== Education ==
The Town of Caledonia is served by the Lowndes County School District. It is home to Caledonia Elementary School, consisting of grades K-5, Caledonia Middle School, grades 6-8, and Caledonia High school, grades 9-12, together are called Caledonia School. The current high school building opened August 1986 after the passage of a county bond issue in November 1984. The new building replaced the historic auditorium that burned down in 1982. The elementary is the first level 5 school in the district. The school's nickname is the Cavaliers and the school colors are cardinal red and white. The school along with Amory school district are the best school districts in North Mississippi. Caledonia offers more Advanced Placement classes than Columbus, West Lowndes, or New Hope schools.

The high school was heavily damaged by a tornado on January 10, 2009. The part of the school that was hit has now been rebuilt. The school has rebuilt the vo-tech center and has gotten a new middle school gym.

East Mississippi Community College is the designated community college for Lowndes County.

== Notable people ==
- Derek Sherrod, former National Football League offensive tackle
- Dezmond Sherrod, former NFL and UFL tight end
