= Birney Imes =

American photographer (born 1951)

- Born: 1951 (age 74–75); Columbus, Mississippi
- Education: University of Tennessee
- Occupation: Photographer
- Parent(s): Vinton Birney Imes, Jr. Nancy McClanahan Imes

Birney Imes (born 1951) is an American photographer. He is best known for his photographs of the American South, especially his home state of Mississippi. His work is exhibited in museums across the United States.

== Biography ==
=== Early life ===
Birney Imes III was born in 1951 in Columbus, Mississippi. His father, Vinton Birney Imes, Jr., owned the town newspaper, The Commercial Dispatch. His mother is Nancy McClanahan Imes. He attended desegregated public schools in Columbus and graduated from the University of Tennessee at Knoxville with a Bachelor of Arts degree in History in 1973.

=== Career ===
Imes began photographing after graduation from college and is largely self-taught. In the mid-70s, he worked as a photographer for his family's newspaper in his hometown of Columbus. Later, he opened his own studio above the Princess Theater in Columbus. Along with his personal work, Imes shot commercial work for local clients and took assignments for magazines like Rolling Stone, The Village Voice and Texas Monthly. Drawing inspiration from the photographs of other Southern artists like Eudora Welty and William Eggleston, his work concentrates on the American South, especially blacks in the Mississippi Delta.

Imes photographs are included in the collections of The Museum of Modern Art and the Metropolitan Museum of Art, both in New York City; the Art Institute of Chicago; the Bibliothèque nationale de France in Paris and numerous museum and private collections in the United States. His work has been exhibited widely in solo and group shows, including The Art Institute of Chicago, the Museum of Modern Art and the Whitney Museum of American Art in New York City, the Center for Creative Photography at the University of Arizona, and the Ogden Museum of Southern Art in New Orleans, Louisiana.

In 1991 University Press of Mississippi published "Juke Joint," the first of Imes' three books. University Press followed "Juke Joint" with the 1994 publication of "Whispering Pines." That same year Smithsonian Press published a collection of his black and white work, "Partial to Home."

=== Personal life ===
He lives in Columbus, Mississippi with his wife Beth. They have three children: Peter, John and Tanner.

== Bibliography ==
- Juke Joint (Jackson, Mississippi: University Press of Mississippi, 1990).
- Whispering Pines (Jackson, Mississippi: University Press of Mississippi, 1994).
- Partial to Home (Smithsonian Press, 1994).
