= West Lowndes High School =

Location
- 644 S Frontage Road; Columbus, Mississippi address 39701; United States
- 33°28′44″N 88°30′0″W

Information
- Type: Public
- Founded: 1971
- School district: Lowndes County School District (Mississippi)
- Superintendent: Sandra Wilcher
- NCES School ID: 280273000531
- Principal: Antonio G. Magee
- Grades: 7-12
- Enrollment: 216
- Student to teacher ratio: 7.87
- Colors: Navy, Gold
- Mascot: Panther
- Website: www.lowndes.k12.ms.us/schools/wlhs/index

West Lowndes High School is a rural school in Lowndes County, Mississippi, with a Columbus, Mississippi postal address. The student body in 2025 was about 97 percent African American and 3 percent white. It is operated by the Lowndes County School District (Mississippi).

== History ==
The school was founded in 1971 as Motley High School.

In 1986, 50 students refused to attend after a bond issue allocated money to predominantly white high schools in the area, which forced the school to consolidate with a middle school.

In 1990, the school changed its name to West Lowndes High School. Until 2012 the school district was under federal control for compliance with desegregation orders. Improvement to its baseball field and entryway were among the final fixes for compliance.

In 2025 it received a C rating.

In 2025 the West Lowndes High School band received six trumpets donated by an alumnus.

== Athletics ==
Panthers are the school mascot. It competes in the 1A division. Anthony King is the football coach.

== See also ==
- List of high schools in Mississippi
