= Columbus Municipal School District =

School district in Mississippi

The Columbus Municipal School District is a public school district with its headquarters in Columbus, Mississippi (USA).

The majority of the city limits of Columbus are in this district, as well as a portion of the New Hope census-designated place. The district also serves the children of the Columbus Air Force Base military personnel; the district is one of two options available for families living on-post. Most of the census-designated place "Columbus AFB" is physically within this district.

The Columbus Municipal School District is governed by a five-member school board. CMSD's mascot is the falcon. The district is also the home of the oldest public school in Mississippi, Franklin Academy, which was founded in 1821. The CMSD currently consists of approximately 4,100 students enrolled in grades Pre-K through grade 12.

== Administrative Personnel ==
=== Columbus School Board ===
- Telisa Young, President
- Fredrick Sparks, Vice President
- Josie Shumake, Secretary
- Robert Smith, Trustee
- Cynthia Stewart Brown, Trustee

=== District Administration ===
- Dr. Stanley K. Ellis, Superintendent
- Mr. Craig Chapman, Assistant Superintendent
- Mrs. Shernise Wilson, Assistant Superintendent
- Holly Rogers, Chief Financial Officer
- Latoya Straughter-Evans, Director of Human Resources
- Danielle McGee, Director of Technology
- Mary Pollitz, Director of Public Relations

== District Schools ==
=== District Schools ===
- Columbus High School
- Columbus Middle School
- Joe Cook Elementary School
- Franklin Academy
- Fairview Elementary School
- Sale Elementary School
- Stokes-Beard Elementary School
- McKellar Technology Center
- Union Success Academy

== Building Level Administrators ==
=== Columbus High School ===
Marlon Andrew, Principal

=== Columbus Middle School ===
Kimberly Williams, Principal

=== Franklin Academy ===
Jeffrey Smith, Principal

=== Joe Cook Elementary School ===
Tiffiney Weddle, Principal

=== Fairview Elementary School ===
Monte Ewing-Johnson, Principal

=== Sale Elementary School ===
Freda Dismukes, Principal

=== Stokes-Beard Elementary School ===
Tanesha Jennings, Principal

=== McKellar Technology Center ===
Dr. Angela Johnson, Director

=== Union Success Academy ===
Dr. Melinda Robinson, Principal

== Notable alumni ==
- Kylin Hill, former professional football player

== See also ==
- List of school districts in Mississippi
