= Passie Fenton Ottley =

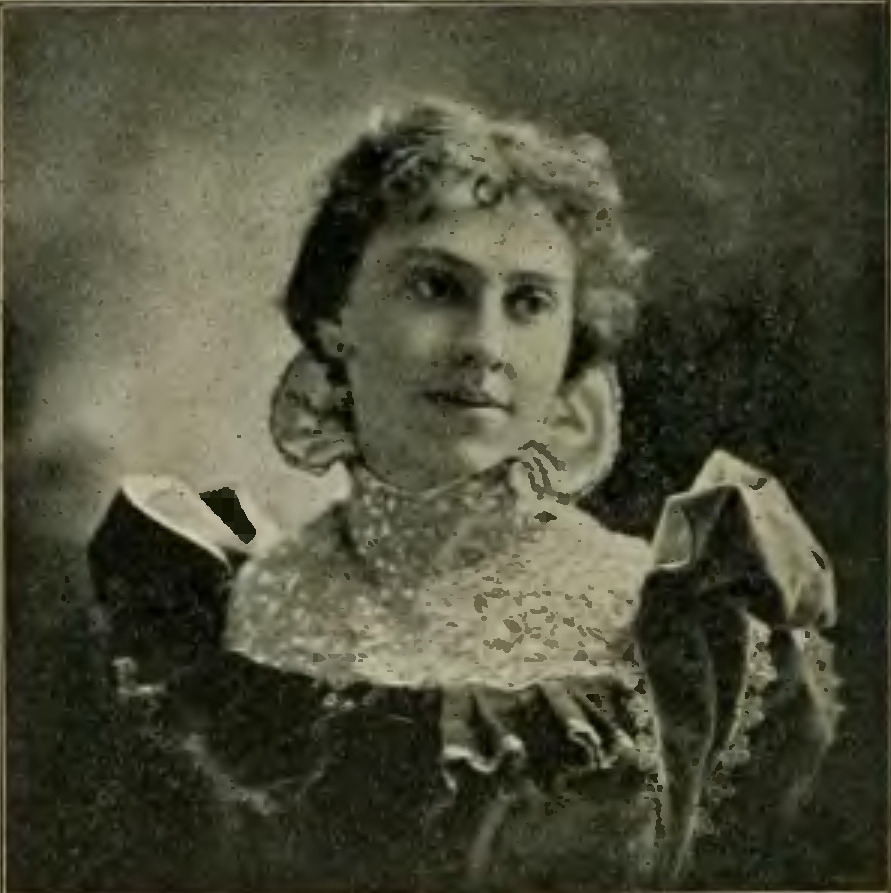
Passie Fenton Ottley

Passie Fenton Ottley (née Fenton; after marriage, known as Mrs. John King Ottley; 1868–1940) was an American leader in club, social service, and educational work in the South. For many years, she served as Chair of the Georgia Library Commission.

== Early life and education ==
Passie Fenton was born Columbus, Mississippi. Her parents were Dr. Fenton Mercer and Passie (Butler) McCabe.

Ottley was educated at Mary Baldwin Seminary (now Mary Baldwin University), Staunton, Virginia; Institute at Columbus, Mississippi; and the University of Chicago. In 1926, the University of Chicago awarded her an Honorary D. Litt.

== Career ==
Ottley became a member of the board of the Georgia Library Commission in 1906 and served as chairman most of that time. Her last reappointment was for the 1936-39 term. From 1922, Ottley served as the third director of the Tallulah Falls School. Her newspaper work was along the lines of educational articles and in promoting social betterment movements.

Otley was one of the founders of the federated woman's club movement in Georgia. For 17 years, she actively worked along every line of social betterment in Georgia. She was a member of the United Daughters of the Confederacy (UDC); Daughters of the American Revolution (DAR); Woman's Department Welfare Work; National Civic Federation; Atlanta Woman's Club; and History Class. Through her husband, she was also a member of the Capitol City Club, Piedmont Driving Club, and Brookhaven Club.

== Personal life ==
In Columbus, Mississippi, she married John King Ottley, chairman of the board, First National Bank, Atlanta. Their children were Passie May and John King.

In religion, she was Presbyterian.

Otley made her home at "Joyeuse," 20 Ponce de Leon Avenue, Atlanta, Georgia, where she died August 16, 1940.
