= Dezmond Sherrod =

American football player (born 1998)

No. 88, 84
- Position: Tight end

Personal information
- Born: May 11, 1985 (age 41); Newport, Rhode Island, U.S.
- Listed height: 6 ft 2 in (1.88 m)
- Listed weight: 250 lb (113 kg)

Career information
- High school: Caledonia (Caledonia, Mississippi)
- College: Mississippi State (2003–2007)
- NFL draft: 2008: undrafted

Career history
- Pittsburgh Steelers (2008–2009)*; Houston Texans (2009)*; Las Vegas Locomotives (2010–2011)
- * Offseason or practice squad member only

Awards and highlights
- Super Bowl champion (XLIII); UFL champion (2010)

Dezmond Allan Sherrod (born May 11, 1985) is an American former professional football tight end. He played college football at Mississippi State. He was a member of the Pittsburgh Steelers and Houston Texans of the National Football League (NFL). Sherrod also played for the Las Vegas Locomotives of the United Football League (UFL). He was a member of the Steelers team that won Super Bowl XLIII.

== Early life ==
Dezmond Allan Sherrod was born on May 11, 1985, in Newport, Rhode Island. He played high school football at Caledonia High School in Caledonia, Mississippi. He caught 24 passes for 425 yards as a junior, and 11 passes for 134 yards and four touchdowns as a senior. In the class of 2003, Sherrod was rated the No. 47 tight end in the country by Rivals.com. He was also rated the No. 22 overall recruit in Mississippi by Rivals. He was also a starter in basketball in high school. Sherrod originally committed to play college football at the University of Alabama but later switched to Mississippi State University.

== College career ==
Sherrod played college football for the Mississippi State Bulldogs. He was redshirted in 2003, and was a four-year letterman from 2004 to 2007. He was primarily a blocking tight end in college. Sherrod played in all 11 games, starting two, his redshirt freshman year in 2004 and caught four passes for 21 yards. Sherrod appeared in all 11 games, starting two, for the second consecutive season in 2005, recording one reception for five yards and two assisted tackles. He played in 12 games, starting five, during the 2006 season, catching two passes for 14 yards. He also spent time on special teams in 2006. Sherrod appeared in every game for the Bulldogs for the fourth straight year in 2007, playing in 13 games (nine starts) while totaling one reception for ten yards, two solo tackles, and one assisted tackle. He was teammates with his brother Derek in 2007. He graduated from Mississippi State in May 2007 with a degree in risk management and insurance.

== Professional career ==
After going undrafted in the 2008 NFL draft, Sherrod signed with the Pittsburgh Steelers on April 28, 2008. He was released on August 30 but signed to the team's practice squad on September 3, 2008. He spent the entire 2008 season on the practice squad. On February 1, 2009, the Steelers won Super Bowl XLIII against the Arizona Cardinals by a score of 27–23. Sherrod re-signed with the Steelers on February 12, 2009. He was released on September 5 and signed to the team's practice squad the next day. He was released by the Steelers for the final time on September 15, 2009.

Sherrod was signed to the practice squad of the Houston Texans on November 4, 2009. He became a free agent after the 2009 season.

Sherrod signed with the Las Vegas Locomotives of the United Football League (UFL) in 2010. He played in six games, starting one, for the Locomotives during the 2010 season and caught one pass for three yards. On November 27, 2010, the Locomotives beat the Florida Tuskers in the 2010 UFL championship game by a score of 23–20. Sherrod re-signed with Las Vegas on May 23, 2011. He appeared in three games in 2011 and recorded one reception for six yards.

== Personal life ==
In August 2013, it was reported that Sherrod was working in management at the Target in Daphne, Alabama. His brother Derek also played football.
