= White's Slough =

Coordinates: 33.48012815°N 88.44190157°W

White's Slough is a rare Cypress swamp in northeast Mississippi close to Columbus.
