= New Hope High School (Mississippi) =

Location
- 3419 New Hope Road; Columbus address, Lowndes County, Mississippi; United States; 33.44899°N 88.322°W

Information
- School district: Lowndes County School District
- Superintendent: Sam Allison
- Principal: Matt Smith
- Staff: 65 (FTE)
- Grades: 9th – 12th
- Enrollment: 824 (2023-24)
- Student to teacher ratio: 28
- Colors: Black and gold
- Mascot: Trojan
- Website: www.lowndes.k12.ms.us/schools/nhhs/index
- New Hope High School's athletic logo

New Hope High School is located in New Hope, Mississippi, US, with a Columbus postal address. It is part of the Lowndes County School District. The principal of the school as of 2013 is Matt Smith.

== Demographics ==
In 2006–2007, New Hope's student body was White (non-Hispanic) 64%, Black (non-Hispanic) 35%, all others 1%.

== Advanced Placement courses ==
New Hope offers a variety of Advanced Placement courses; a few examples are AP Biology, Statistics, Physics, and Calculus.

== Languages and language programs ==
- Spanish I, II, and III

== Sport programs ==
- Baseball

4A State Champions – 1991, 1996 (43–0 record), 1998, 2003, 2019
5A state champions - 2013, 2014

- Soccer
- Basketball

4A State Champions – 2008

- Softball

Slow Pitch 4A State Champions – 1989, 1990, 1997, 2000–2005, 2007, 2008
ASA Slow Pitch 18U National Champions – 2005

- Cheerleaders

National Champions – 2008
4A Mississippi State Champions – 2002, 2003, 2004, 2006

- American football
- Marching band

== Gallery ==
2008 4A State Champions

2008 National Champions
