= Columbus Lake (Mississippi) =

- Location within Mississippi Location within the United States
- Location: Lowndes / Clay counties, Mississippi
- Coordinates: 33°32′03″N 88°29′28″W
- Type: Reservoir
- Basin countries: United States
- Surface elevation: 161 ft (49 m)

Columbus Lake is a lake in northeast Mississippi on the Tennessee-Tombigbee Waterway. Close to Columbus, it is impounded by the John C. Stennis Lock and Dam.
