= Peter Pitchlynn =

Nineteenth century Choctaw chief

Peter Perkins Pitchlynn
- Hatchootucknee
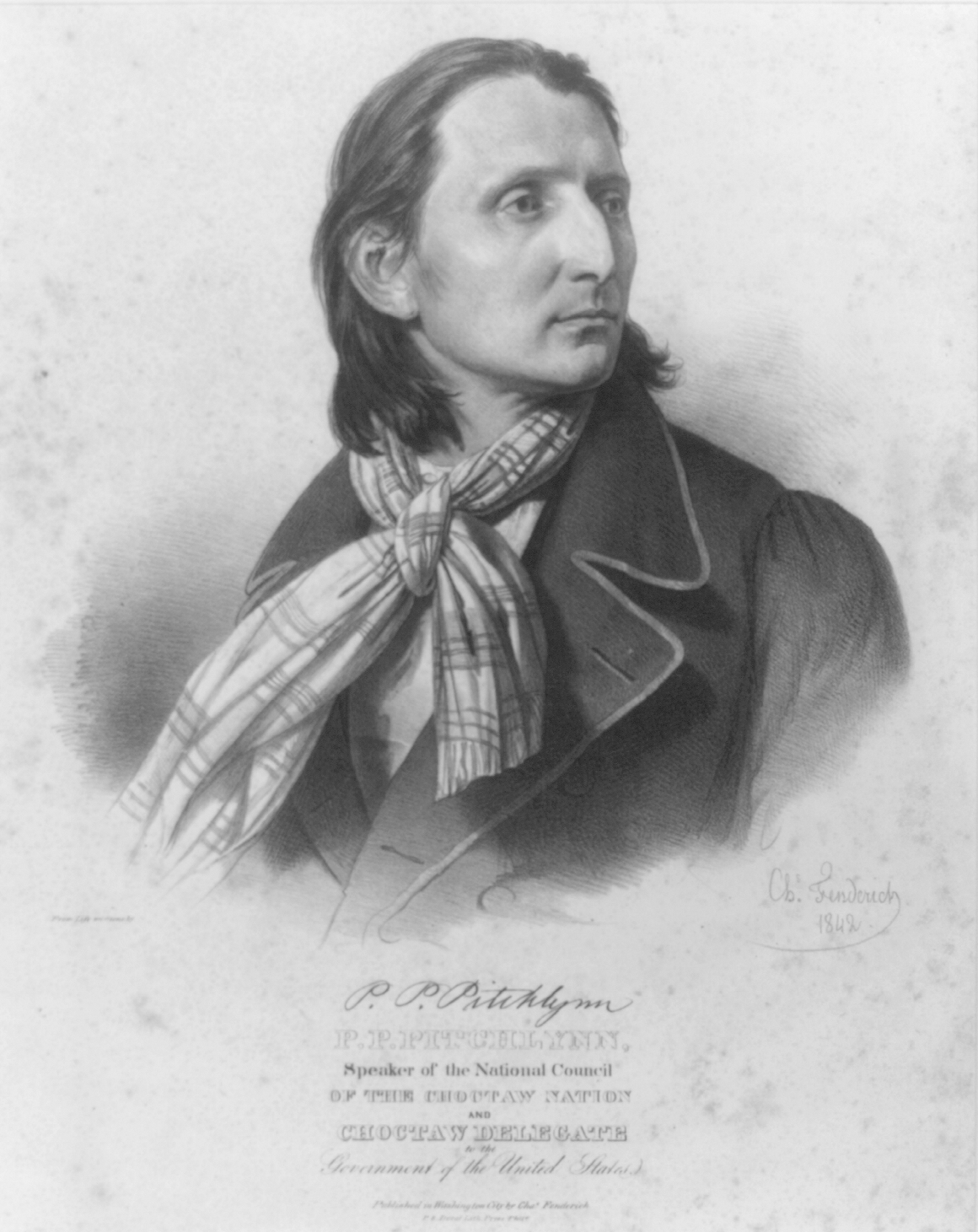

Chief of the Choctaw Nation
- In office 1864–1866
- Preceded by: Samuel Garland
- Succeeded by: Allen Wright

Choctaw Delegate to the United States
- In office 1845–1861
- Preceded by: Position established
- Succeeded by: Vacant
- In office 1867–1881
- Preceded by: Vacant
- Succeeded by: Benjamin Smallwood

Personal details
- Born: Hatchootucknee; January 30, 1806 Nakshobi, Choctaw Nation
- Died: January 17, 1881 (aged 74) Washington, D.C., U.S.
- Resting place: Congressional Cemetery
- Party: Independent
- Other political affiliations: National Union (1864–1868)
- Parent: John Pitchlynn
- Relatives: Rhoda Pitchlynn Howell (sister); Samuel Garland (brother-in-law)
- Education: University of Nashville
- Occupation: Politician; diplomat; chief
- Known for: Defending Choctaw lands and monetary claims in Washington and promoting education of Choctaw youth

Military service
- Allegiance: Choctaw Nation
- Branch/service: Lighthorse
- Years of service: 1824–1881
- Rank: Colonel

Peter Pitchlynn (Choctaw: Hatchootucknee, lit. 'Snapping Turtle') (January 30, 1806 – January 17, 1881) was a Choctaw military and political leader. A long-time diplomat between his tribe and the federal government, he served as principal chief of the Choctaw Republic from 1864 to 1866 and surrendered to the Union on behalf of the nation at the end of the Civil War.

Educated both in Choctaw culture and American schools, in 1825 Pitchlynn helped found the Choctaw Academy in Kentucky and later served as its superintendent. He also worked to reduce the sale of alcohol in their territory. After joining his people on the forced removal to Indian Territory in the 1830s, he was appointed by the National Council in 1845 as the Choctaw Delegate (akin to an ambassadorship) to Washington. At the time, the Nation was proposing to be recognized by the US Congress as a territory.

After the war, Pitchlynn returned to Washington, D.C., to represent Choctaw interests and work for concessions from the government for the Choctaw lands sold under pressure to the United States in 1830 during Indian removal. He died in Washington, D.C., and is buried there.

== Early life and education ==
Peter Perkins Pitchlynn was born on January 30, 1806, in present-day Noxubee County, Mississippi, which at the time, was part of the Old Choctaw Nation. A mixed blood, he was the first son of Sophia Folsom, a Choctaw woman of partly Anglo-American descent; her mother Natika was Choctaw and her father was Ebenezer Folsom, an Anglo-American trader. Sophia's Choctaw name was Lk-lo-ha-wah (Loved but lost). His father was Major John Pitchlynn, a man of Scots descent. The father was raised from childhood by the Choctaw after the death of his father Isaac, a widower. John Pitchlynn served George Washington as an interpreter for negotiations with the Choctaw. Sophia Folsom and John Pitchlynn had married in 1804. As the Choctaw had a matrilineal kinship system of property and hereditary leadership, Peter was born into his mother's clan and people; through her family, he gained status in the tribe.

One of ten children born to the Pitchlynns, after several years at home, Peter was sent to a Tennessee boarding school about 200 miles from Mississippi. Later he attended an academy in Columbia, Tennessee. To complete his education, he studied at and graduated from the University of Nashville, considered one of the finest institutions of the time. It started small like many colleges; its 1827 graduating class held 12 students.

After he obtained his degree, Pitchlynn returned to his family home in Mississippi, where he became a farmer. The Choctaw were among the Southeast tribes that used enslaved African Americans as workers on their farms.

In 1824, Pitchlynn was made the head of the Lighthorse, the Choctaw Nation's mounted police, and received the rank of colonel. Among other lawkeeping duties, he supervised the removal of whiskey from tribal lands.

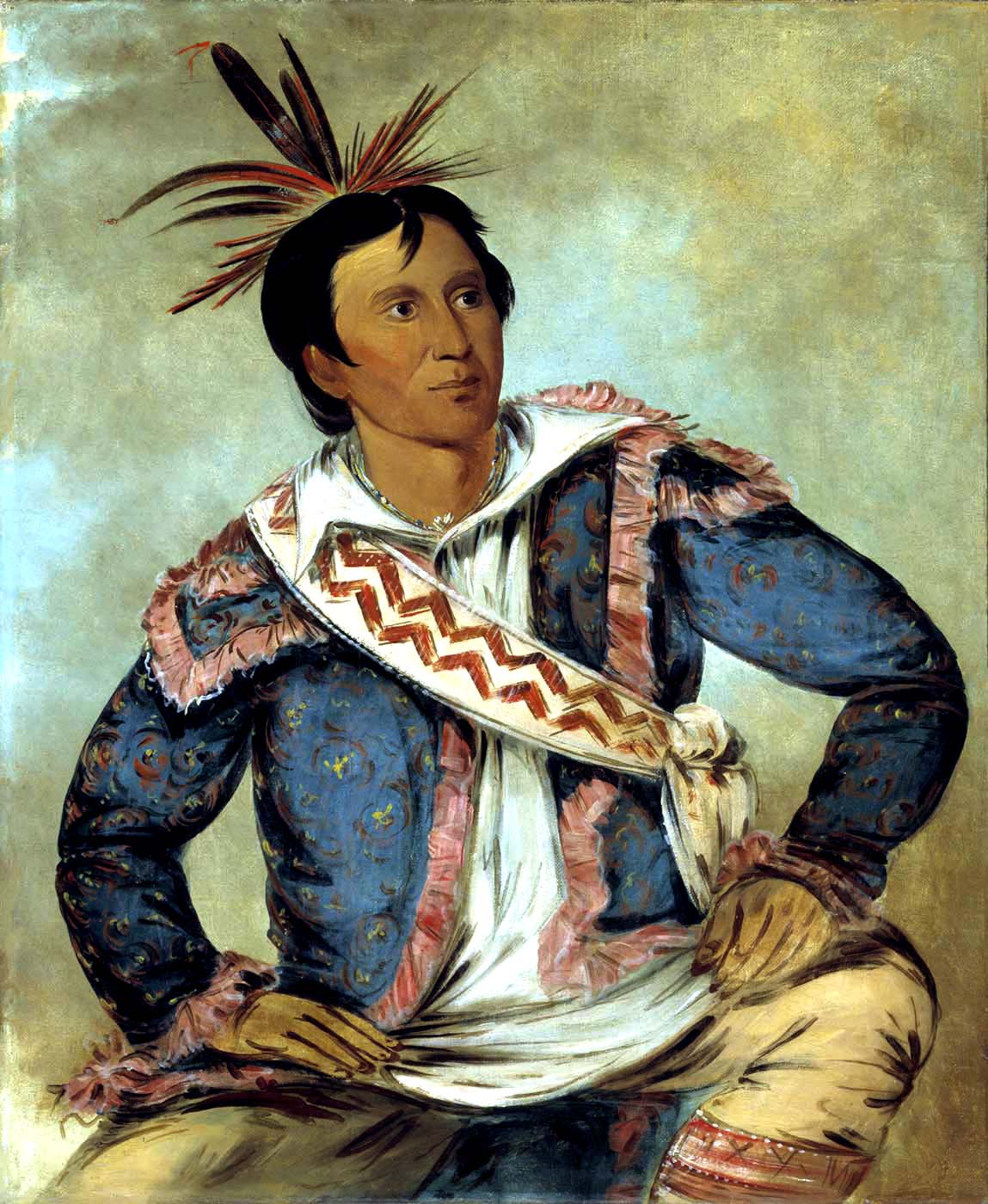
Portrait of Peter Pitchlynn by George Catlin, 1834 in Fort Gibson, Arkansas.

== Marriage and family ==
He soon married Rhoda Folsom, a first cousin. As part of changing practices, they were married by a missionary, Reverend Cyrus Kingsbury. They had several children: Lycurgus, Peter P. Jr., Leonidas, Rhoda Mary (married D.L. Kannedy), Malvinia (married Loring S.W. Folsom). After his wife's death, Pitchlynn corresponded regularly with his older children while they were away at school, trying to give them guidance. Lycurgus attended a school in Tennessee and Peter Jr. one in Oxford, Georgia.

The Pitchlynn sons had difficulties as youths and adults: Lycurgus and Leonidas were convicted of assault in 1857 and sentenced to prison. The father gained a pardon for them from President James Buchanan. In 1860, Peter Jr. shot and killed his uncle, Lorenzo Harris, who was married to his father's sister Elizabeth Pitchlynn. Some said it was self-defense. After Rhoda's death, Peter married a widow, Caroline Lombardy. They had a daughter together, Sophia. She never married and continued to live with her father after her mother's death.

== Career ==
"You never saw such a people in your life. Their manners and action are wild in the extreme. They are in a perfect state of nature and would be a curiosity to any civilized man. They are a rude and uncultivated race, and from every appearance a miserable set."

— Pitchlynn describing his encounters with the Sioux, 1828

Pitchlynn was well educated in both Choctaw and European-American culture. He began working on ways to improve Choctaw life. He worked to ban the sale of alcohol in Choctaw territory. Believing that education was important, he persuaded the National Council to found the Choctaw Academy, located in Blue Springs, Scott County, Kentucky in 1825. It sometimes accepted students of other American Indian tribes as well as Choctaw, such as Omaha and Sioux boys. Pitchlynn stayed closely involved with the school, receiving quarterly reports.

In 1830 Pitchlynn was elected to the National Council of Choctaw. Because of his education, he served as an interpreter and effective liaison between the Choctaw and the US federal government. He moved with the Choctaw to Indian Territory in the 1830s, where they resettled. Pitchlynn settled his family on the Mountain Fork river, near Eagletown, in present day McCurtain County. Pitchlynn's widowed mother, Sophia Folsom Pitchlynn, moved with her son. After her death, she was buried there, and hers is the oldest known grave in Oklahoma.

While Pitchlynn originally inherited slaves from his father, unlike other Choctaw slaveholders like Robert McDonald Jones, he felt an indifference towards the institution. Following the Emancipation Proclamation in 1863, he willingly cast it aside without protest.

English author Charles Dickens was touring the United States when he met Pitchlynn on a steamboat on the Ohio River. He described the Choctaw leader at length:

He was a remarkably handsome man; some years past forty, I should judge; with long black hair, an aquiline nose, broad cheek-bones, a sunburnt complexion, and a very bright, keen, dark, and piercing eye. There were but twenty thousand of the Choctaws left, he said, and their number was decreasing every day. A few of his brother chiefs had been obliged to become civilised, and to make themselves acquainted with what the whites knew, for it was their only chance of existence. But they were not many; and the rest were as they always had been. He dwelt on this: and said several times that unless they tried to assimilate themselves to their conquerors, they must be swept away before the strides of civilised society.

When we shook hands at parting, I told him he must come to England, as he longed to see the land so much: that I should hope to see him there, one day: and that I could promise him he would be well received and kindly treated. He was evidently pleased by this assurance, though he rejoined with a good-humoured smile and an arch shake of his head, that the English used to be very fond of the Red Men when they wanted their help, but had not cared much for them, since.

He took his leave; as stately and complete a gentleman of Nature's making, as ever I beheld; and moved among the people in the boat, another kind of being. He sent me a lithographed portrait of himself soon afterwards; very like, though scarcely handsome enough; which I have carefully preserved in memory of our brief acquaintance.

In 1840 the Council appointed Pitchlynn as a teacher and superintendent of the Choctaw Academy. The following year, they decided to relocate the school to the Choctaw Nation (located in Indian Territory). Pitchlynn's correspondence shows they were also discussing the need for a girls' school.

Pitchlynn continued to take on more responsibilities for the Nation; in 1845 he was appointed as the Choctaw Delegate to Washington, DC to represent the nation there. That year both the Choctaw and Cherokee proposed to the US Congress that their respective nations should be recognized as independent United States territories, but this was not supported. In 1847, he helped arrange the removal of further Choctaw from Mississippi to the Choctaw Nation by steamboat.

== Civil War and final years ==
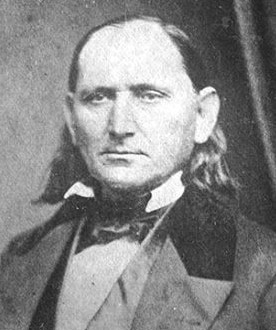
Pitchlynn in the time of the American Civil War.

In 1861, Pitchlynn was in Washington, D.C., to address national affairs of the Choctaw when the American Civil War started, and immediately returned to the Choctaw Nation, hoping to escape the expected strife. He advocated loyalty to the Union or at the very least neutrality in the conflict, (with himself holding pro-Union sympathies) and then-chief George Hudson sought to maintain Choctaw neutrality. Despite wanting to avoid the war, the Choctaw were not permitted to remain neutral. Following an invasion of Choctaw territory in May 1861 by Texan forces, pro-Confederate elements in the government led by Robert McDonald Jones, the president pro-tempore of the Choctaw Senate, threatened Chief Hudson and strong-armed the tribe into an alliance with the Confederacy. The tribal populace was divided by this action: some allied with the Confederacy and others with the Union. All suffered in the aftermath of the war.

He was elected Principal Chief of the Choctaws on October 6, 1864. On June 19, 1865, Chief Pitchlynn surrendered the military to Union troops occupying Doaksville, Choctaw Nation, and signed the terms of surrender himself. The Choctaws laid down their arms, and the Union took control of the territory until a formal peace treaty was signed the following spring.

The Reconstruction treaty was drawn up by the United States. Overseen by U.S. special commissioner Ely S. Parker, the Southern Treaty Commission crafted the 1866 Treaty with the Choctaw and Chickasaw. The Choctaw delegation included Allen Wright, Alfred Wade, James Riley, John Page, and Campbell LeFlore, alongside Pitchlynn himself, in addition to the Chickasaw delegates. The treaty had 51 articles and was proclaimed in July 1866.

While in Washington in 1866 to reestablish diplomatic relations with the United States, as well as stave off government-sponsored attempts to colonize Indian Territory, Pitchlynn met with Queen Emma of Hawaii, introduced her to his family and conducted diplomatic cultural exchange. This remains, to date, the only instance of bilateral relations between the Choctaw Republic and the Hawaiian Kingdom.

Pitchlynn remained chief until 1866, when he was succeeded by Allen Wright. Afterwards, Pitchlynn returned to Washington, DC as the Choctaw delegate, where he worked to press Choctaw claims for lands in Mississippi sold under pressure to the United States in 1830. He had been collecting information on this issue since the 1850s from officials involved in the Treaty of Dancing Rabbit Creek, and later joined the Lutheran Church. He also became a prominent member of the Masonic Order. Pitchlynn addressed President Ulysses S. Grant and several congressional committees in defense of Choctaw claims.

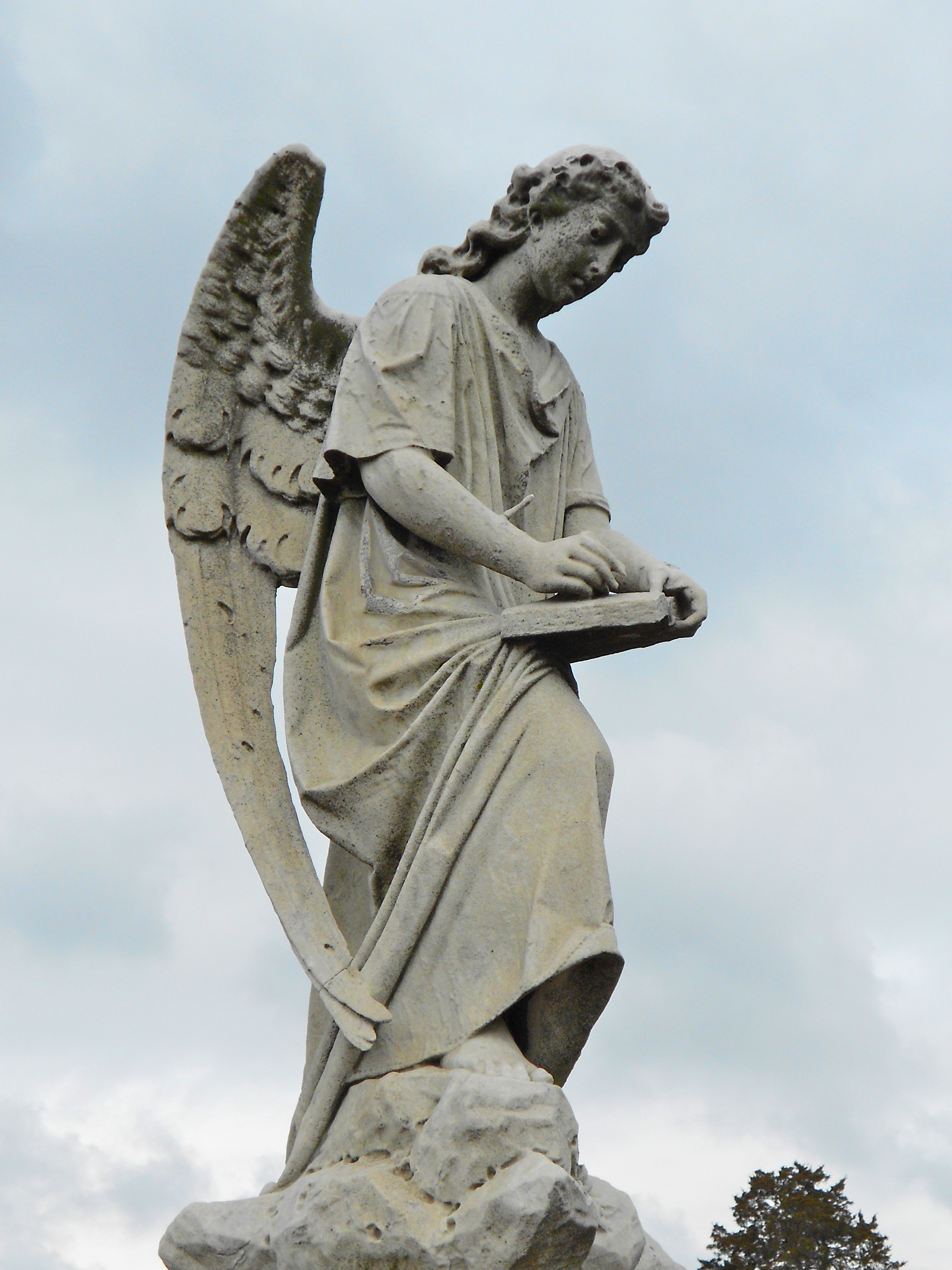
Angelic sculpture marking Pitchlynn's grave in the Congressional Cemetery

He resisted the incorporation of the freedmen, arguing the Treaty of 1866 made them American citizens after the Choctaw did not adopt them, and thus they were not entitled to rights within the tribe.

After his death in Washington in 1881, Pitchlynn was buried there in Congressional Cemetery. He was the third Native American to be buried there, after his fellow Choctaw chief Pushmataha and the Apache chief Taza.

Pitchlynn was reported to have told of the origin of the Choctaw:

according to the traditions of the Choctaws, the first of their race came from the bosom of a magnificent sea. Even when they first made their appearance upon the earth they were so numerous as to cover the sloping and sandy shore of the ocean ... in the process of time, however, the multitude was visited by sickness ... their journey lay across streams, over hills and mountains, through tangled forests, and over immense prairies ... so pleased were they with all that they saw that they built mounds in all the more beautiful valleys they passed through, so the Master of Life might know that they were not an ungrateful people.

== Legacy and honors ==
- The Choctaw Nation placed a monument at his gravesite in Congressional Cemetery in his honor.
- His papers are held by the University of Oklahoma, in the Western Histories Collection.

== See also ==
- Apuckshunubbee
- Pushmataha
- Mosholatubbee
- Greenwood LeFlore
- List of Choctaw Treaties
