= Lowndes County School District (Mississippi) =

School district in Mississippi, USA

Coordinates: 33.469511°N 88.493130°W

Location
- Columbus, Mississippi; Lowndes County United States

District information
- Superintendent: Sam Allison

Other information
- Website: www.lowndes.k12.ms.us

The Lowndes County School District is a public school district headquartered in Columbus, Mississippi (United States).

The district, one of two in Lowndes County, serves the towns of Caledonia, Crawford, and Artesia, the majority of the community of New Hope, small pieces of Columbus, and most rural areas in Lowndes County.

On-post families at Columbus Air Force Base have Caledonia School as one option for education of dependent children. A small piece of the Columbus AFB census-designated place is physically in the Lowndes County district.

== Schools ==
High Schools (Grades 9–12)

- Caledonia High School
- New Hope High School
- West Lowndes High School

Middle Schools (Grades 6–8)

- Caledonia Middle School
- New Hope Middle School
- West Lowndes Middle School

Elementary Schools (Grades K–5)

- Caledonia Elementary School
- New Hope Elementary School (split into two buildings: K–2 and 3–5)
- West Lowndes Elementary School

== Facilities ==
The current 12,000-square-foot (1,100 m^{2}) headquarters building was built in 1992 as the Ecolab building. The district acquired it in 2024 as it is larger than the former district headquarters and because it is about equidistant to the three clusters of schools. The district paid $500,000 to buy it.

== Demographics ==
=== 2006–07 school year ===
There were a total of 5,502 students enrolled in the Lowndes County School District during the 2006–2007 school year. The gender makeup of the district was 49% female and 51% male. The racial makeup of the district was 38.99% African American, 59.52% White, 0.91% Hispanic, 0.47% Asian, and 0.11% Native American. 44.0% of the district's students were eligible to receive free lunch.

=== Previous school years ===
School Year	Enrollment	Gender Makeup		Racial Makeup				
School Year	Enrollment	Female	Male	Asian	African American	Hispanic	Native American	White
2005–06	5,448	49%	51%	0.48%	39.21%	0.42%	0.07%	59.82%
2004–05	5,443	49%	51%	0.55%	39.21%	0.37%	0.07%	59.80%
2003–04	5,383	50%	50%	0.46%	39.23%	0.41%	0.06%	59.84%
2002–03	5,384	49%	51%	0.46%	39.17%	0.67%	0.07%	59.62%

== Accountability statistics ==
	2006-07	2005-06	2004-05	2003-04	2002-03
District Accreditation Status	Accredited	Accredited	Accredited	Accredited	Accredited
School Performance Classifications
Level 5 (Superior Performing) Schools	1	1	0	1	0
Level 4 (Exemplary) Schools	4	4	6	3	3
Level 3 (Successful) Schools	2	4	3	5	5
Level 2 (Under Performing) Schools	2	0	0	0	1
Level 1 (Low Performing) Schools	0	0	0	0	0
Not Assigned	0	0	0	0	0

== See also ==
- List of school districts in Mississippi
