= John C. Stennis Lock and Dam =

John C Stennis Lock and Dam
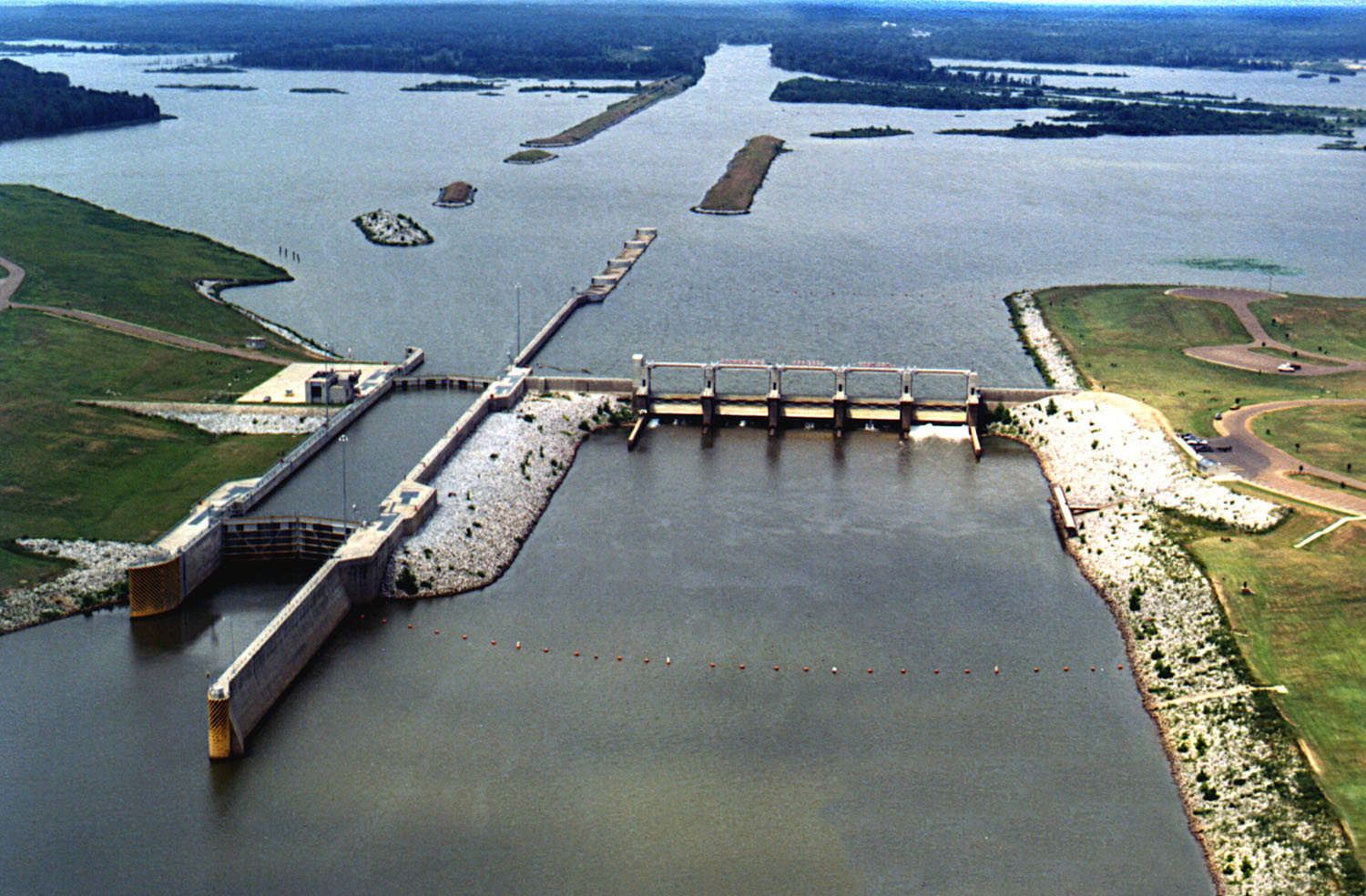
- Aerial view of John C. Stennis Lock and Dam. View is upriver to the north-northwest.
- Interactive map of John C Stennis Lock and Dam
- Coordinates: 33°31′5.31″N 88°29′20.34″W

The John C. Stennis Lock and Dam, formerly named Columbus Lock and Dam, is one of four lock and dam structures on the Tennessee-Tombigbee Waterway that generally lie along the original course of the Tombigbee River. It is located near Columbus, Mississippi, and impounds Columbus Lake. It is named for longtime U.S. Senator from Mississippi, John C. Stennis.
