= John Pitchlynn =

- Born: June 11, 1764 near Charleston, Province of South Carolina, British America
- Died: May 20, 1835 (aged 70); Waverly, Mississippi
- Children: Peter Pitchlynn; Rhoda Pitchlynn Howell

John Pitchlynn served as the official U.S. Interpreter at the Choctaw Agency during the early federal period. Of Scottish-American descent, he had been raised among the Choctaw people. He facilitated relations between the government of the United States and the Choctaw Nation. He was appointed by President George Washington after the United States achieved independence, and served through the administration of Andrew Jackson.

He built a fortified home on the west bank of the Tombigbee River in present-day Mississippi. The village of Plymouth developed near it at a landing site, but it was frequently flooded and ultimately abandoned. Part of this area is now within the Plymouth Bluff Environmental Center.

== Biography ==
John Pitchlynn was born near Charleston, South Carolina, then a British colony. He was the son of Isaac, a Scots immigrant, and his wife Jemima Hickman Pitchlynn, who died young. After his father also died, Pitchlynn was raised by the Choctaw people, with whom his father had worked as a trader. He was fluent in Choctaw and English.

He first served as an interpreter at the Treaty of Hopewell. Under George Washington, he was appointed as an interpreter and head of the Choctaw Agency after approval by Benjamin Hawkins. He continued to serve under President Andrew Jackson. Pitchlynn served as an interpreter at the Treaty of Fort Confederation and the Treaty of Mount Dexter and was present at the signings of the Treaty of Doak's Stand and Treaty of Washington City.

Pitchlynn married twice. About 1780 he married Rhoda Folsom, an Anglo-American. Due to his work, they lived within the Choctaw Nation. He later married Sophia Folsom, a mixed-race Choctaw of partly Anglo-American descent. Her father was Ebenezer Folsom, and her mother Natika was Choctaw. Sophia's Choctaw name was Lk-lo-ha-wah (loved but lost). The couple married in 1804. The Choctaw had a matrilineal kinship system, so their children were considered born to Natika's clan and were raised in Choctaw culture.

Pitchlynn had ten children. The most notable of these was their son Peter Pitchlynn, who in 1864 became principal chief of the Choctaw Nation of Oklahoma. This was decades after their removal from the Southeast under the 1831 Treaty of Dancing Rabbit Creek. The senior Pitchlynn had ensured that his son Peter was educated in Anglo-American classical tradition, as well as in Choctaw culture. His daughter, Rhoda Pitchlynn Howell became a rancher and community leader who played a role in developing the agricultural and educational infrastructure in Indian Territory.

Pitchlynn died on his plantation at Waverly, Mississippi on May 20, 1835.
