= The Columbus Packet =

- Type: Weekly newspaper
- Founder: Roger Larsen
- Founded: 1991
- Headquarters: 425 College StColumbus, MS 39701
- Circulation: 11,000 (as of October 2008)
- Website: columbuspacket.com

The Columbus Packet, also known as The Packet, is a weekly newspaper published on Thursdays in Columbus, Mississippi.

== History ==
The newspaper was founded in 1991 by editor and publisher Roger Larsen. Starting in July 2010, Colin Krieger took over the position as editor and publisher of The Columbus Packet with Roger Larsen remaining on as a columnist.
