= Edmund McCurtain House =

- U.S. National Register of Historic Places
- Location within Oklahoma
- Location: Haskell County, Oklahoma, northeast of Kinta, Oklahoma
- Coordinates: 35°07′43″N 95°09′43″W
- Area: less than one acre
- Built: 1866
- NRHP reference No.: 80003265
- Added to NRHP: June 27, 1980

The Edmund McCurtain House, in Haskell County, Oklahoma near Kinta, Oklahoma, was built in 1866. It was listed on the National Register of Historic Places in 1980.

It was deemed "significant for its historical connection with a prominent Choctaw rancher and statesman. Edmund McCurtain, son of Cornelius McCurtain and brother of Jackson and Greenwood McCurtain, was born on June 4, 1842, at Fort Coffee in present day LeFlore County, Oklahoma. During the Civil War he served with the Confederate First Regiment of Mounted Rifles under command of his brother Jackson. After the war, he moved near Sans Bois in present day Haskell County, where he built this ranch home in 1866. McCurtain was one of the wealthiest landowners and ranchers in the Choctaw Nation, cultivating about 300 acres and owning about 500 head of cattle under the Choctaw system of common ownership and use of land."

The regiment referred to might be either the First Choctaw and Chickasaw Mounted Rifles, organized in 1861, or the First Choctaw Mounted Rifles, organized in 1862.

It is located northeast of Kinta.
