= Gilbert Dukes =

Native American politician

Chief of the Choctaw Nation
- In office 1900–1902
- Preceded by: Green McCurtain
- Succeeded by: Green McCurtain

Choctaw National Auditor
- In office 1895–1897

Judge for the Choctaw Nation's 2nd district court
- In office 1889–1895

Justice of the Choctaw Supreme Court
- In office 1885–1889

Personal details
- Born: November 21, 1849 Bok Tuklo, Choctaw Nation
- Died: December 26, 1919 (aged 70) Talihina, Oklahoma, U.S.
- Citizenship: Choctaw Nation; American
- Party: Tuskahoma Party
- Other political affiliations: Republican

Military service
- Allegiance: Confederate States
- Branch/service: Confederate States Army

Gilbert Wesley Dukes was a Choctaw judge and politician who served as the Chief of the Choctaw Nation between 1900 and 1902. He was the Republican candidate for Lieutenant Governor of Oklahoma in 1910.

== Biography ==
Gilbert Wesley Dukes was born on November 21, 1849, in Bok Tuklo, Choctaw Nation, to Joseph Dukes and Nancy Collins. His father was an interpreter and translator for missionaries. Dukes attended the Spenser Academy, read the law, and practiced in tribal courts. He fought for the Confederate States Army during the American Civil War under Jackson McCurtain. After he moved to Talihina, Indian Territory he was elected sheriff for Wade County, Choctaw Nation. He was a Choctaw Nation Supreme Court Justice from 1885 to 1889 and a circuit court judge for the nation's 2nd district between 1889 and 1895. From 1895 to 1897 he served as the nation's auditor. He ran for Chief of the Choctaw Nation in 1900 with the Tuskahoma Party. He supported implementing the Atoka Agreement, settling tribal affairs, and using mineral leases to fund education. He defeated Jacob B. Jackson of the National Party and E. N. Wright of the Union Party. He chose not to seek reelection as Chief in 1902 and was succeeded by his predecessor, Green McCurtain.

Following Oklahoma statehood, he was the Republican candidate for Lieutenant Governor of Oklahoma in 1910. He lost the election to J. J. McAlester.

He married Angeline Wade, the daughter of Choctaw Governor Alfred Wade, in 1870. He died on December 26, 1919, southeast of Talihina.

== Electoral history ==
Oklahoma lieutenant gubernatorial Republican primary (August 2, 1910)
Party	Candidate	Votes	%
Republican	Gilbert W. Dukes	60,938	100%

Results by county McAlester: 40–50%; 50–60%; 60–70%; 70–80%; Dukes: 40–50%; 50–60%; 60–70%

1910 Oklahoma lieutenant gubernatorial election
Party	Candidate	Votes	%	±%
Democratic	J.J. McAlester	118,544	49.3%	−5.4%
Republican	Gilbert W. Dukes	94,621	39.3%	−2.0%
Socialist	John G. Wills	23,974	9.9%	+6.0%
Prohibition	I.A. Briggs	3,136	1.3%	New
Democratic hold		Swing		

== Works cited ==
- Meserve, John Bartlett (Spring 1940). "Chief Gilbert Wesley Dukes". Chronicles of Oklahoma. 18 (1): 53–59.
