= Astigarraga (surname) =

Astigarraga or de Astigarraga is a Basque toponymic surname, derived from the Spanish town Astigarraga. Notable people with the surname include:

- Ignacio Astigarraga (born 1936), Spanish cyclist
- José Luis Astigarraga Lizarralde (1940–2017), Spanish bishop
- Pedro de Astigarraga (1882–1965), Spanish physician and footballer
- Rubén Astigarraga (born 1950), Argentine footballer
- Tara Astigarraga, American software engineer
