= Tandy Walker =

Choctaw chief and Civil War colonial (1814–1877)

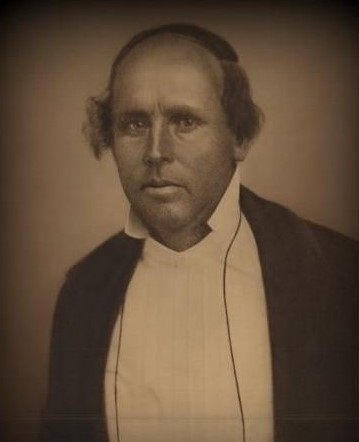

Governor of the Choctaw Nation
- In office 1858–1859
- Preceded by: Alfred Wade
- Succeeded by: Basil LeFlore

President of the Choctaw Senate
- In office 1855–1858

Member of the Choctaw Senate from the Moshulatubbee District
- In office 1851–1858
- Constituency: Iskvlli Kaunti

Personal details
- Born: October 10, 1814 Mississippi
- Died: February 2, 1877 (aged 62) Skullyville, Choctaw Nation
- Citizenship: Choctaw Nation
- Party: Skullyville

Military service
- Allegiance: Choctaw Nation; Confederate States: First Choctaw and Chickasaw Mounted Rifles (1861–64); Second Indian Cavalry Brigade (1864–65)
- Branch/service: Confederate Army
- Years of service: 1861–1865
- Rank: Lieutenant Colonel
- Battles/wars: American Civil War; Battle of Round Mountain; Battle of Chusto-Talasah; First Battle of Newtonia; Battle of Honey Springs; Battle of Poison Spring

Tandy Walker (October 10, 1814 – February 2, 1877) was a Choctaw chief who served as a Colonel in the Confederate Army in the Indian Territory during the American Civil War.

== Biography ==
Walker was born in 1814 in Mississippi. He was of mixed descent. Previously the President of the Choctaw Senate, he assumed the role as Governor of the Choctaw Nation following the resignation of Alfred Wade. He served at a time when the Choctaws were divided over choosing a constitution and forming a new government, with differing factions forming at Skullyville and Doaksville to argue their proposals. Walker served the remainder of Wade's term; his successor, Basil LeFlore, supported the 1857 Skullyville Constitution. However, a new convention held in Doaksville in 1860, ratified the Doaksville Constitution that governed the Choctaw Nation until its annexation by the United States in 1906.

Following the outbreak of hostilities and the Choctaw alliance with the Confederacy, Walker served as a lieutenant colonial in the First Choctaw and Chickasaw Mounted Rifles under Douglas H. Cooper. Walker was given control over the regiment in early 1863, and he was promoted to colonel. In 1864, the regiment was reorganized as the Second Indian Cavalry Brigade. Walker and his troops played important roles in the First Battle of Newtonia, the Battle of Poison Spring, and the Battle of Honey Springs.

Walker's troops were known for their intensity. During the Battle of Poison Spring, also known as the Poison Spring massacre, Walker stated that his men were motivated by the thought of shedding "the blood of their despised enemy...the ravagers of their country, the despoilers of their homes, and the murderers of their women and children." His Choctaw troops were accused of desecrating corpses and scalping.

Walker died in Skullyville, Oklahoma in 1877.

== Legacy ==
Walker was described by Waterman L. Ormsby, a correspondent of The New York Herald, as having the look of "a full-blooded white man. He had a very comfortable house, owned a farm of several hundred acres and, also, several hundred head of cattle. In personal appearance he looks like a well-to-do farmer... He has considerable influence over [Choctaw] Nation, and is favorably disposed toward the Overland Mail Company."

Walker's Station was a stop on the Butterfield Overland Mail route. It served as Walker's residence and office. It is listed on the National Register of Historic Places.

The University of Oklahoma maintains the Tandy C. Walker Collection, a collection of news articles pertaining to Walker's life and career.
