= Choctaw Nation of Oklahoma =

Federally recognized tribe in Oklahoma, US

Choctaw Nation Chahta Okla (Choctaw) Choctaw Nation of Oklahoma
- Indian reservation
- Flag Seal
- Motto: Na Yimmi, Chukkachʋffa, Micha Aiimʋlhpesa (English: Faith, Family, Culture)
- Anthem: ("Nahata Fichik Tohwikeli" and "Antʋt bilia" used for some occasions)
- Location (red) in the U.S. state of Oklahoma
- Recognized: January 3, 1786; 240 years ago (Treaty)
- Established: September 27, 1830; 196 years ago (Treaty)
- Expansions: 1843–1855
- Reductions: 1855–1867
- Constitution: January 11, 1860; 166 years ago
- Annexed by the U.S.: June 16, 1906; 120 years ago
- Self-determination: 1971
- Reservation Reconstituted: July 9, 2020; 6 years ago
- Capital: Durant (de facto); Tuskahoma (de jure)
- Subdivisions: 12 Districts

Government
  - Type: Republic
  - Body: Choctaw Tribal Council
  - Chief: Gary Batton (R)
  - Assistant Chief: Jack C. Austin, Jr. (R)
  - Speaker: Thomas Williston (D)
  - Chief Justice: David Burrage (D)
  - U.S. House Delegate-designee: Vacant

Area
  - Total: 28,140 km^{2} (10,864 sq mi)

Population (2020)
  - Total: 226,984
  - Density: 8.0669/km^{2} (20.893/sq mi)
- 48,000; Choctaw/Nat. Am. 185,126 White and other
- Demonym: Choctaw
- Time zone: UTC−06:00 (CST)
  - Summer (DST): UTC−05:00 (CDT)
- Website: choctawnation.com

Choctaw Nation of Oklahoma

Total population
- 223,279 total enrollment, 84,670 enrolled in Oklahoma

Regions with significant populations
- United States (Oklahoma)

Languages
- English, Choctaw

Religion
- Protestantism

Related ethnic groups
- other Choctaw bands, Chickasaw, Chakchiuma

The Choctaw Nation of Oklahoma (Choctaw: Chahta Okla) is a federally recognized Native American tribal nation with an Indian reservation encompassing portions of Southeastern Oklahoma in the United States.

The Choctaw Nation of Oklahoma (CNO) is one of three federally recognized tribes of Choctaw people, an Indigenous people of the Southeastern Woodlands. The other two are the Mississippi Band of Choctaw Indians and Jena Band of Choctaw Indians in Louisiana. The U.S. federal government forcibly removed the Choctaw Nation of Oklahoma from their Mississippi homelands in 1831 to 1833 to Indian Territory, later to become Oklahoma. A smaller group of Mississippi Choctaw were coerced to migrating to Oklahoma in 1908.

The Choctaw Nation of Oklahoma is the third-largest tribe in the United States with more than 225,000 tribal citizens. A total of 233,126 people live within these boundaries, with its tribal jurisdictional area comprising 10.5 counties in the state.

At roughly 6,952,960 acres (28,138 km^{2}; 10,864 sq mi), the Choctaw Nation's reservation is the second-largest in area after the Navajo Nation, exceeding that of the seven smallest U.S. states (Rhode Island, Delaware, Connecticut, New Jersey, New Hampshire, Vermont, and Massachusetts). The reservation borders with the reservations of the Chickasaw Nation, Muscogee (Creek) Nation, and Cherokee Nation, as well as the U.S. states of Texas and Arkansas. The original territory has expanded and shrunk several times since the 19th century, reaching its current boundaries in 1867. The seat of government is located in Durant, Oklahoma.

== Terminology ==
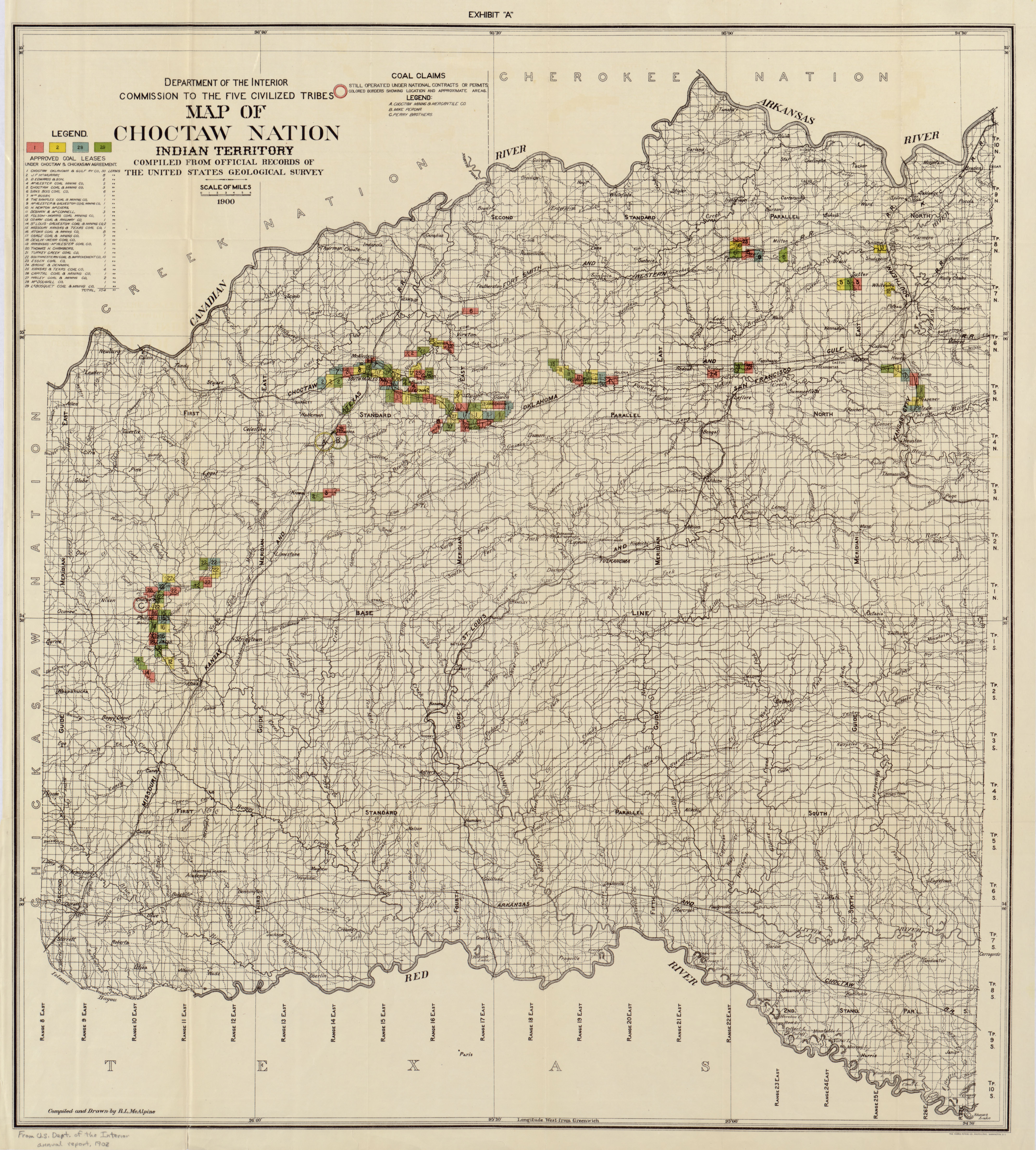
1900 map of the Choctaw Nation

In English, the official name for the reservation was "Choctaw Nation", as outlined in Article III of the 1866 Reconstruction Treaty following the Civil War. During its time of sovereignty within the United States Indian Territory, it also utilized the title "Choctaw Republic". Since 1971, it is officially referred to as the "Choctaw Nation of Oklahoma". The Choctaw Nation maintains a government-to-government relationship with both the United States federal government and State of Oklahoma.

Officially a domestic dependent nation since 1971, in July 2020 the Supreme Court ruled in McGirt v. Oklahoma that the eastern area of Oklahoma—about half of the modern state—never lost its status as a Native reservation. This includes the city of Tulsa (located between Muscogee and Cherokee territory). The area includes lands of the Chickasaw, Choctaw, Cherokee, Muscogee and Seminole. Among other effects, the decision potentially overturns convictions of over a thousand cases in the area involving tribal citizens convicted under state laws. The ruling is based on an 1832 treaty, which the court ruled was still in force, adding that, "Because Congress has not said otherwise, we hold the government to its word." As such, the Choctaw Nation returned from a domestic dependent nation status to that of an Indian reservation.

== Geography ==
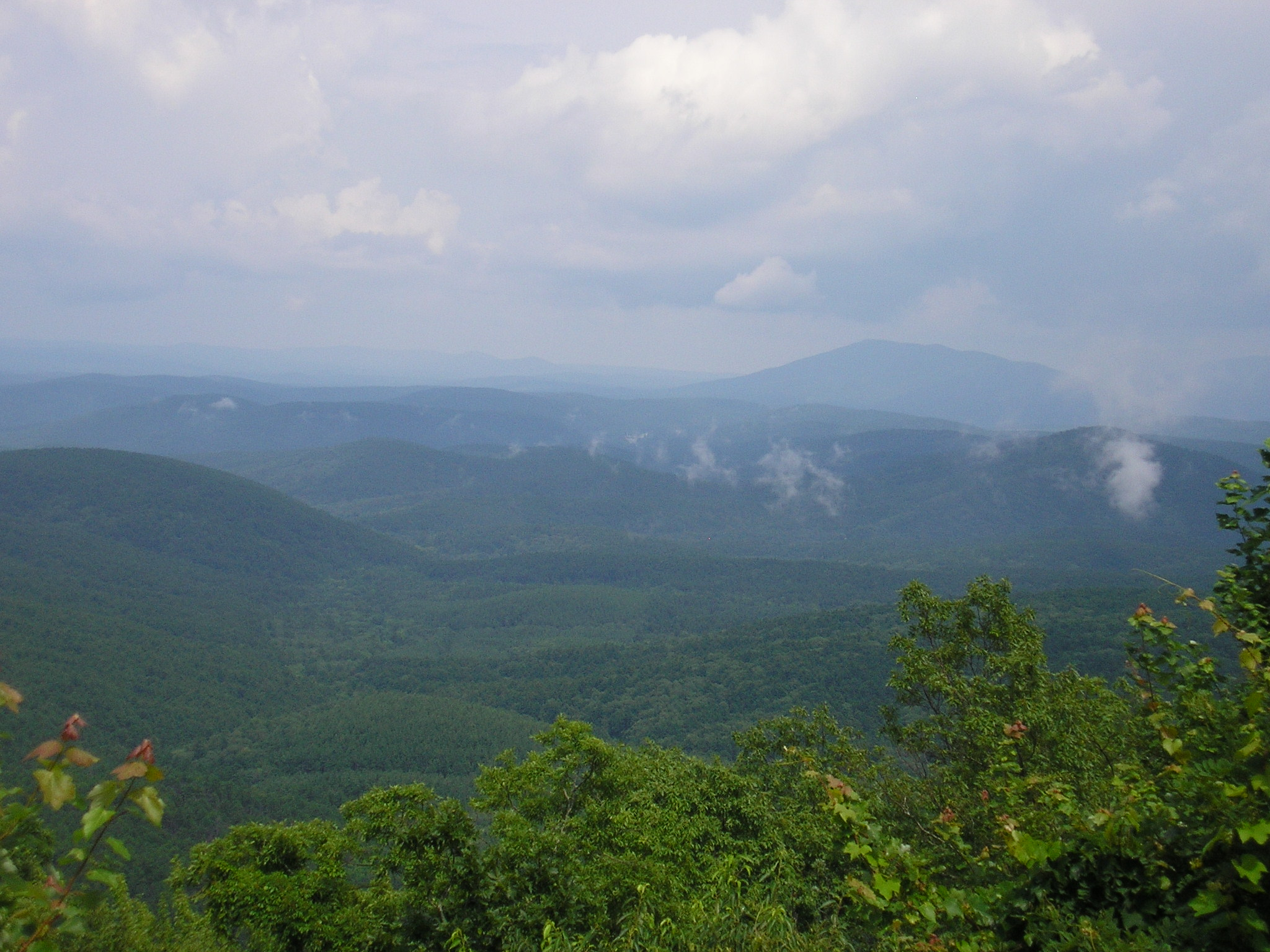
Mountains in the eastern region of the Choctaw Nation

The Choctaw Nation of Oklahoma's reservation covers 10,864 square miles (28,140 km^{2}), encompassing eight whole counties and parts of five counties in Southeastern Oklahoma:

- Atoka County,
- most of Bryan County,
- Choctaw County,
- most of Coal County,
- Haskell County,
- half of Hughes County,
- a portion of Johnston County,
- Latimer County,
- Le Flore County,
- McCurtain County,
- Pittsburg County,
- a portion of Pontotoc County, and
- Pushmataha County.

== Government ==
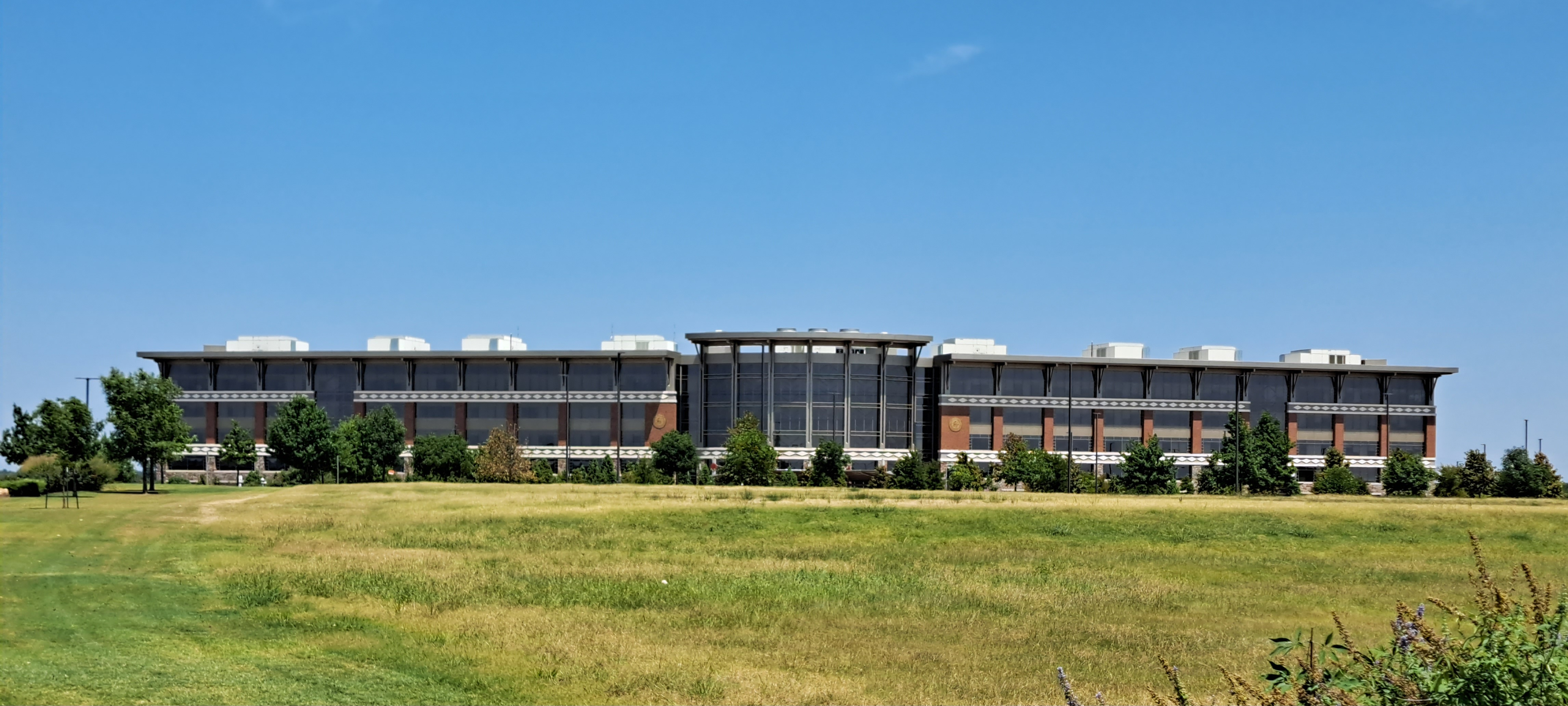
Choctaw Nation Headquarters

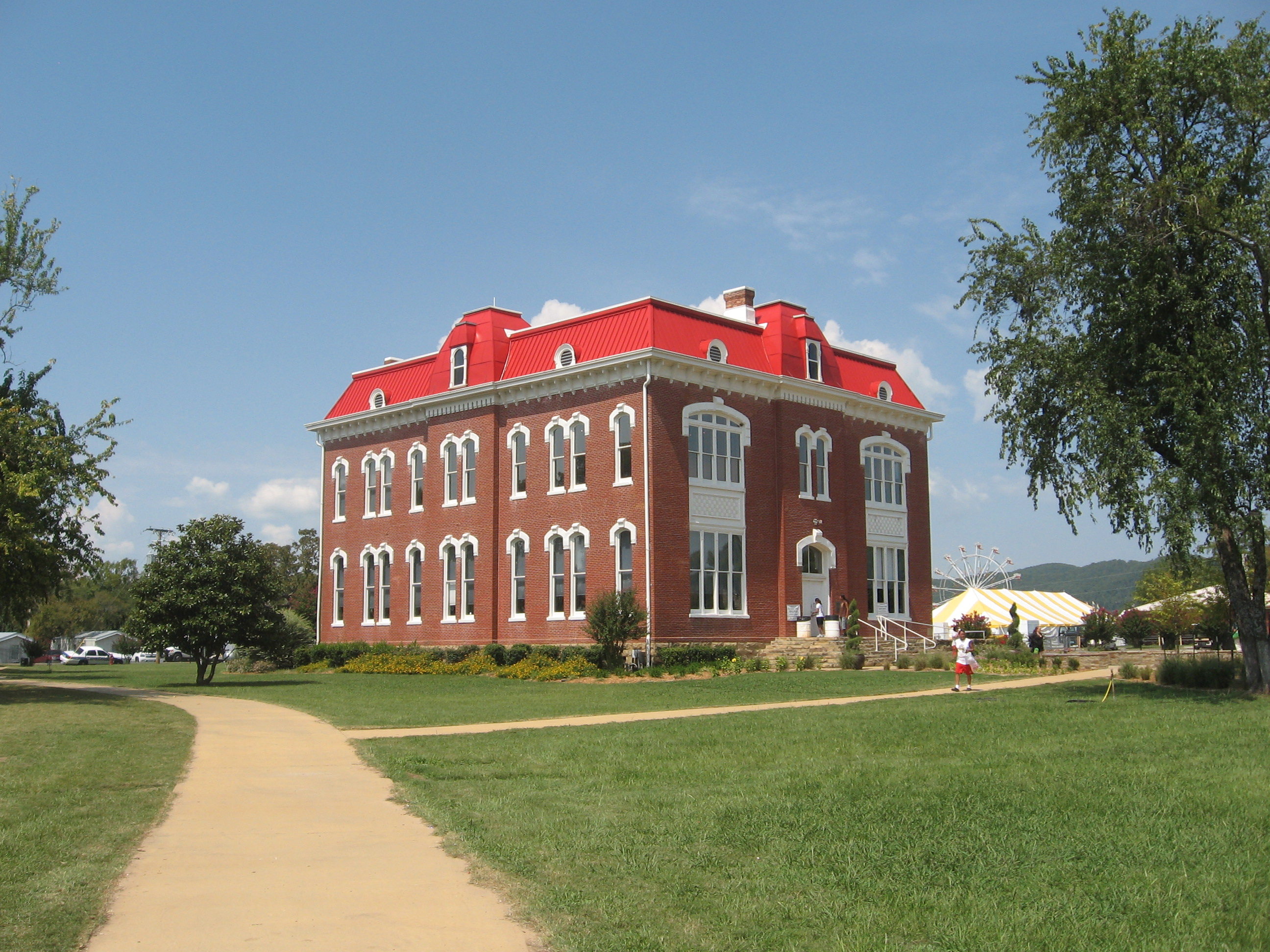
The historic Choctaw Capitol in Tuskahoma, now a tribal museum

The tribal headquarters are located in Durant, and house the office of the Chief. Opened in June 2018, the new headquarters is a 5-story, 500,000 square-foot building located on an 80-acre campus in south Durant. It is near other tribal buildings, such as the Regional Health Clinic, Wellness Center, Community Center, Child Development Center, and Food Distribution. Previously, headquarters was located in the former Oklahoma Presbyterian College, with more offices scattered around Durant. The chief of the Choctaw Nation is Gary Batton, who took office on April 29, 2014, after the retirement of Gregory E. Pyle. and the assistant chief is Jack Austin, Jr. The Tribal Council meets monthly at Tvshka Homma, across the street from the historic Choctaw Capitol Building, built in 1884 and since been adapted for use as the Choctaw Nation Museum.

The tribe is governed by the Choctaw Nation Constitution, which was ratified by the people on June 9, 1984. The constitution provides for an executive, a legislative and a judicial branch of government. The chief of the Choctaw Tribe, elected every four years, is not a voting member of the tribal council. These members are elected from single-member districts for four-year terms. The legislative authority of the tribe is vested in the Tribal Council, which consists of twelve members.

Citizenship in the Choctaw Nation is outlined in Article II Section I of the constitution which states that citizenship is for "Choctaw Indians by blood whose names appear on the final rolls of the Choctaw Nation approved pursuant to Section 2 of the Act of April 26, 1906, and their lineal descendant." The constitution cannot be amended without a vote of tribal members and currently excludes Choctaw Freedmen. A constitutional amendment can be passed through "two methods: (1) a proposal of Tribal Council requiring 8 affirmative votes and/or (2) by a petition containing the entire text of the amendment and signed by no less than 30 percent of the total number of qualified voters voting in the last Chief's election." While the current Chief, Gary Batton, disagrees that denying citizenship to the Freedmen is a race issue, this ignores the historical racist legacy of the Dawes Rolls. Also, because the Nation, along with the other Five Civilized Tribes, supported the Confederacy during the U.S. Civil War, they severed ties with the federal government, making the U.S. require these tribes to make new peace treaties, emancipate their slaves, and offer full citizenship. Numerous families had intermarried by that time or had other personal ties to the tribe as well, but the Choctaw Nation did not uphold the Treaty of 1866. Some like Chief Batton and Dr. Blue Clarke, a Muscogee Nation citizen and a professor of Indigenous Law at Oklahoma City University, claim it is an issue about tribal sovereignty, though it's only within the last 50 years that they have not been recognized as citizens. The "Freedmen were adopted in as part of the tribe in 1885" but in "1983, the Choctaw Nation added a 'by-blood' requirement into the constitution that excluded many." While tribal sovereignty at times seeks for the tribe to be treated like a country with similar rights, tribes have "treaty relationships with the United States, which makes that relationship part of the foundational fabric of the U.S. government" and the Five Tribes also made agreements with the government after losing in the Civil War when they sided with the Confederacy. For many Choctaw Freedmen, it is about getting the tribe to acknowledge its participation in chattel slavery through Native American slave ownership. The citizenship definition of many tribal nations runs counter to how other countries or nations define their citizenship (based on borders, birth location, naturalization, instead of descendance, race, or ethnicity), and most federally recognized tribes are subject to the U.S. Government's final acceptance.

In 2011, the tribe had 223,279 enrolled citizens, of whom 84,670 live within the state of Oklahoma and 41,616 live within the Choctaw Nation's jurisdiction.

The General Fund Operating Budget, the Health Systems Operating Budget, and the Capital Projects Budget for the fiscal year beginning October 1, 2017, and ending September 30, 2018, was $516,318,568.

On September 9, 2023, the tribal council approved a comprehensive budget for fiscal year 2024 of $2.529 billion. The budgeted operating expense is $1.585 billion, budgeted maintenance capital is $36.5 million, and cost of goods sold being $495 million that totals a budgeted request of $2.116 billion, resulting in an anticipated net income of $412.7 million.

Politically, the Choctaw Nation is completely encompassed by Oklahoma's 2nd congressional district, represented by Republican and Choctaw citizen Josh Brecheen. With a majority of both Native American and white voters in the region leaning conservative, Republican Donald Trump carried every county in the Choctaw Nation in the 2024 election, as well as every county in the state of Oklahoma, continuing a trend seen in the 2004, 2008, 2012, 2016 and 2020 elections. The Choctaw Nation is located in one of the most conservative areas of Oklahoma, and while registered Democrats outnumber Republicans, the region has consistently gone to Republican candidates. The current head of the government, Chief Gary Batton, is a Republican.

The Choctaw Nation also has the right to appoint a non-voting delegate to the U.S. House of Representatives, per the 1830 Treaty of Dancing Rabbit Creek; as of 2024 however, no delegate has been named or sent to the Congress by the Choctaw Nation.

=== Executive department ===
The supreme executive power of the Choctaw Nation is assigned to a chief magistrate, styled as the "Chief of the Choctaw Nation" (Choctaw: mi̱ko). The Assistant Chief (mi̱ko iaka̱ya) is appointed by the Chief with the advice and consent of the Tribal Council, and can be removed at the discretion of the Chief. The current Chief of the Choctaw Nation is Gary Batton, and the current Assistant Chief is Jack Austin, Jr.

The chief's birthday (Batton's is December 15) is a tribal holiday.

In 2021, the tribal council instituted October 16 as Choctaw Flag Day, a holiday to celebrate the adoption of the Choctaw Nation Seal on October 16, 1860.

==== Governmental history ====
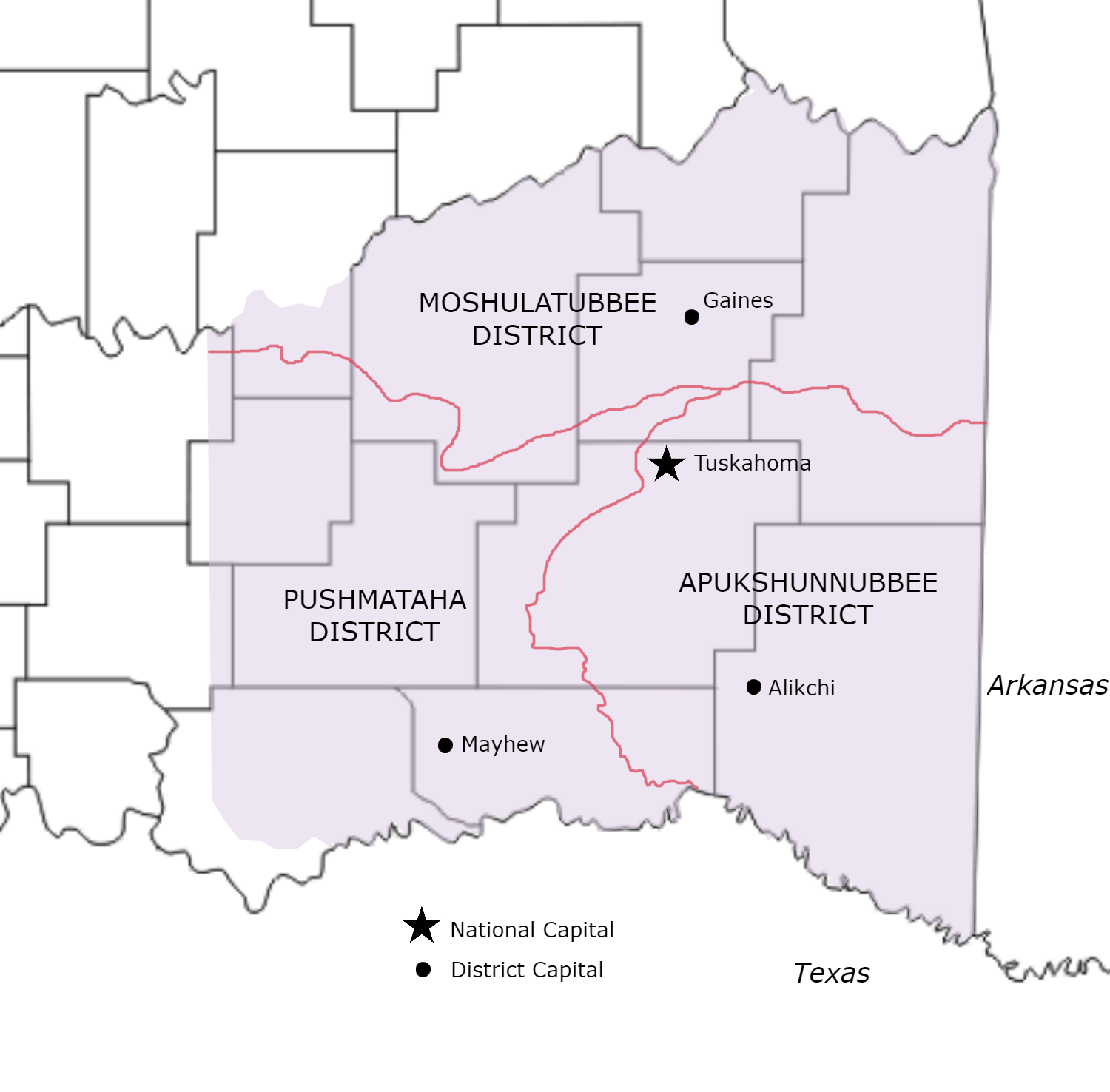
Former Choctaw Nation districts, shown with present-day Oklahoma counties

Before Oklahoma was admitted to the union as a state in 1907, the Choctaw Nation was divided into three districts (ulhti): Apukshunnubbee, Moshulatubbee, and Pushmataha. Each district had its own chief from 1834 to 1857; afterward, the three districts were put under the jurisdiction of one chief. The three districts were re-established in 1860, again each with their own chief, with a fourth chief to be Principal Chief of the tribe. These districts were abolished at the time of statehood, as tribal government and land claims were dissolved in order for the territory to be admitted as a state. The tribe reorganized to re-establish its government and passed a constitution re-establishing the council in 1979. In the elections held that year, Harriet Wright O'Leary James became the first woman elected to serve on the nation's council.

==== List of Chiefs ====
Choctaw Nation, Indian Territory (1834–1906)	Districts					
Choctaw Nation, Indian Territory (1834–1906)	Moshulatubbee		Apukshunnubbee		Pushmataha	
Choctaw Nation, Indian Territory (1834–1906)	District Chief	Term	District Chief	Term	District Chief	Term
Choctaw Nation, Indian Territory (1834–1906)	Moshulatubbee	1834–1836	Thomas LeFlore	1834–1838	Nitakechi	1834–1838
Choctaw Nation, Indian Territory (1834–1906)	Joseph Kincaid	1836–1838	Thomas LeFlore	1834–1838	Nitakechi	1834–1838
Choctaw Nation, Indian Territory (1834–1906)	John McKinney	1838–1842	James Fletcher	1838–1842	Pierre Juzan	1838–1841
Choctaw Nation, Indian Territory (1834–1906)	Nathaniel Folsom	1842–1846	Thomas LeFlore	1842–1850	Isaac Folsom	1841–1846
Choctaw Nation, Indian Territory (1834–1906)	Peter Folsom	1846–1850	Thomas LeFlore	1842–1850	Salas Fisher	1846–1850
Choctaw Nation, Indian Territory (1834–1906)	Cornelius McCurtain	1850–1854	George W. Harkins	1850–1857	George Folsom	1850–1854
Choctaw Nation, Indian Territory (1834–1906)	David McCoy	1854–1857	George W. Harkins	1850–1857	Nicholas Cochnauer	1854–1857
Choctaw Nation, Indian Territory (1834–1906)	Districts abolished in 1857					
Choctaw Nation, Indian Territory (1834–1906)	Unified Nation					
Choctaw Nation, Indian Territory (1834–1906)	Governor		Term	Party		
Choctaw Nation, Indian Territory (1834–1906)	Alfred Wade		1857–1858	Skullyville		
Choctaw Nation, Indian Territory (1834–1906)	Tandy Walker		1858–1859	Skullyville		
Choctaw Nation, Indian Territory (1834–1906)	Basil LeFlore		1859–1860	Skullyville		
Choctaw Nation, Indian Territory (1834–1906)	Principal Chief		Term	Party		
Choctaw Nation, Indian Territory (1834–1906)	George Hudson		1860–1862	Treaty		
Choctaw Nation, Indian Territory (1834–1906)	Samuel Garland		1862–1864	Treaty		
Choctaw Nation, Indian Territory (1834–1906)	Peter Pitchlynn		1864–1866	Union		
Choctaw Nation, Indian Territory (1834–1906)	Allen Wright		1866–1870	Progressive		
Choctaw Nation, Indian Territory (1834–1906)	William Bryant		1870–1874	National		
Choctaw Nation, Indian Territory (1834–1906)	Coleman Cole		1874–1878	National		
Choctaw Nation, Indian Territory (1834–1906)	Isaac Levi Garvin		1878–1880	National		
Choctaw Nation, Indian Territory (1834–1906)	Jackson McCurtain		1880–1884	Progressive		
Choctaw Nation, Indian Territory (1834–1906)	Edmund McCurtain		1884–1886	Progressive		
Choctaw Nation, Indian Territory (1834–1906)	Thompson McKinney		1886–1888	Progressive		
Choctaw Nation, Indian Territory (1834–1906)	Benjamin Smallwood		1888–1890	National		
Choctaw Nation, Indian Territory (1834–1906)	Wilson N. Jones		1890–1894	Progressive		
Choctaw Nation, Indian Territory (1834–1906)	Jefferson Gardner		1894–1896	Progressive		
Choctaw Nation, Indian Territory (1834–1906)	Green McCurtain		1896–1900	Tuskahoma		
Choctaw Nation, Indian Territory (1834–1906)	Gilbert Wesley Dukes		1900–1902	Tuskahoma		
Choctaw Nation, Indian Territory (1834–1906)	Green McCurtain		1902–1906	Tuskahoma		
Choctaw Nation of Oklahoma (1906–Present)
Choctaw Nation of Oklahoma (1906–Present)	Chief		Term	Party		
Choctaw Nation of Oklahoma (1906–Present)	Green McCurtain		1906–1910 (Appointed by Roosevelt in 1906)	Republican		
Choctaw Nation of Oklahoma (1906–Present)	Victor Locke, Jr.		1910–1918 (Appointed by Taft)	Republican		
Choctaw Nation of Oklahoma (1906–Present)	William F. Semple		1918–1922 (Appointed by Wilson)	Democratic		
Choctaw Nation of Oklahoma (1906–Present)	William H. Harrison		1922–1929 (Appointed by Harding)	Republican		
Choctaw Nation of Oklahoma (1906–Present)	Ben Dwight		1929–1937 (Appointed by Hoover)	Republican		
Choctaw Nation of Oklahoma (1906–Present)	William A. Durant		1937–1948 (Appointed by Roosevelt)	Democratic		
Choctaw Nation of Oklahoma (1906–Present)	Harry J. W. Belvin		1948–1959; 1959–1970 (First appointed by Eisenhower); 1971–1975	Democratic		
Choctaw Nation of Oklahoma (1906–Present)	C. David Gardner		1975–1978	Republican		
Choctaw Nation of Oklahoma (1906–Present)	Hollis E. Roberts		1978–1997	Democratic		
Choctaw Nation of Oklahoma (1906–Present)	Gregory E. Pyle		1997–2014	Democratic		
Choctaw Nation of Oklahoma (1906–Present)	Gary Batton		2014–Present	Republican		

=== Legislative department ===
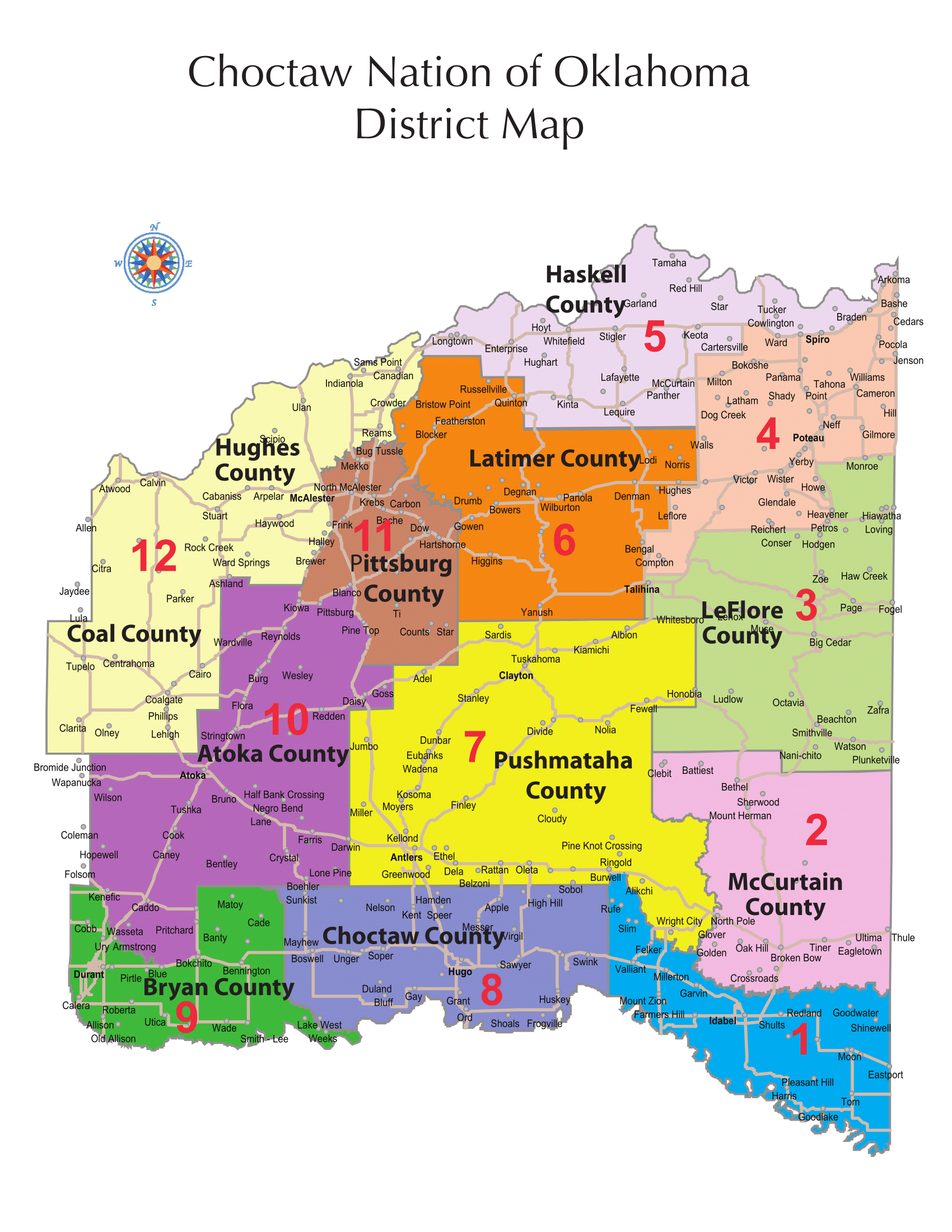
Current district map of the Choctaw Nation of Oklahoma

The legislative authority is vested in the unicameral Tribal Council. Members of the Tribal Council are elected by the Choctaw people, one for each of the twelve districts in the Choctaw Nation.

Current Tribal Council
District	Portrait	Councilman	First elected	Term ends
District 1		Thomas Williston	November 29, 2010	September 4, 2027
District 2		Tony Ward	September 7, 2015	September 4, 2027
District 3		Eddie Bohanan	September 2, 2019	September 4, 2027
District 4		Jess Henry	July 11, 2021	September 5, 2029
District 5		Jennifer Turner	August 9, 2025	September 5, 2029
District 6		Jennifer Woods	September 4, 2017	September 5, 2029
District 7		Joey Tom	August 9, 2021	September 5, 2029
District 8		Perry Thompson	September 1, 1987	September 4, 2027
District 9		James Dry	September 4, 2017	September 5, 2029
District 10		Anthony Dillard	September 5, 2005	September 5, 2029
District 11		Robert Karr	September 2, 2019	September 4, 2027
District 12		Regina Mabray	September 5, 2025	September 5, 2029

The tribal council members are the voice and representation of the Choctaw people in the tribal government. In order to be elected as council members, candidates must have resided in their respective districts for at least one year immediately preceding the election and must be at least one-fourth Choctaw Indian by blood and at least twenty-one years of age. Once elected, council members must remain a resident of their district during the term in office.

Once in office, the tribal council members have regularly scheduled county council meetings. The presence of these tribal leaders in the Indian community creates a sense of understanding of their community and its needs. The Tribal Council is responsible for adopting rules and regulations which govern the Choctaw Nation, for approving all budgets, decisions concerning the management of tribal property, and all other legislative matters. The Tribal Council assists the community to implement an economic development strategy and to plan, organize, and direct Tribal resources to achieve self-sufficiency.

=== Judicial department ===
Durant is also the seat of the tribe's judicial department, housed in the Choctaw Nation Judicial Center, near the Headquarters. The judicial authority of the Choctaw Nation is assigned to the Court of General Jurisdiction (which includes the District Court and the Appellate Division) and the Constitutional Court. The Constitutional Court consists of a three-member court, who are appointed by the Chief. At least one member, the presiding judge (Chief Justice), must be a lawyer licensed to practice before the Supreme Court of Oklahoma.

==== Judicial department members ====
- Constitutional Court
  - Chief Justice David Burrage
  - Judge Mitch Mullin
  - Judge Frederick Bobb
- Appellate Division
  - Presiding Judge Pat Phelps
  - Judge Bob Rabon
  - Judge Warren Gotcher
- District Court
  - Presiding District Judge Richard Branam
  - District Judge Mark Morrison
  - District Judge Rebecca Cryer

==== Government treaties ====
The Choctaw underwent many changes to their government since its first interactions with the United States. The Choctaw Nation acknowledges these treaties and categorizes them by "Pre-Removal Treaties" and "Post-Removal Treaties".

==== Foreign relations ====
The Choctaw supported Ireland by donating money during the Great Irish Famine of 1847. The two nations have maintained relations ever since. In 2018 Irish Taoiseach (Prime Minister) Leo Varadkar announced the Choctaw-Ireland Scholarship Programme – an opportunity for Choctaw students to study in Ireland. The program was launched "in recognition of the act of generosity and humanitarianism shown by the Choctaw Nation of Oklahoma towards the people of Ireland during the Great Famine of the mid-Nineteenth Century, and to foster and deepen the ties between the two nations today". The programme is available for postgraduate students, and those studying at University College Cork; within the disciplines of Art, Social Sciences or Celtic Studies.

In 2015 a sculpture known as Kindred Spirits was erected in the town of Midleton, County Cork, Ireland, to commemorate the Choctaw Nation's donation. A delegation of 20 citizens of the Choctaw Nation attended the opening ceremony along with the County Mayor of Cork. In 2024 a companion sculpture Sacred Hearts was unveiled in Tuskahoma to commemorate Choctaw-Irish relations.

== Economy ==
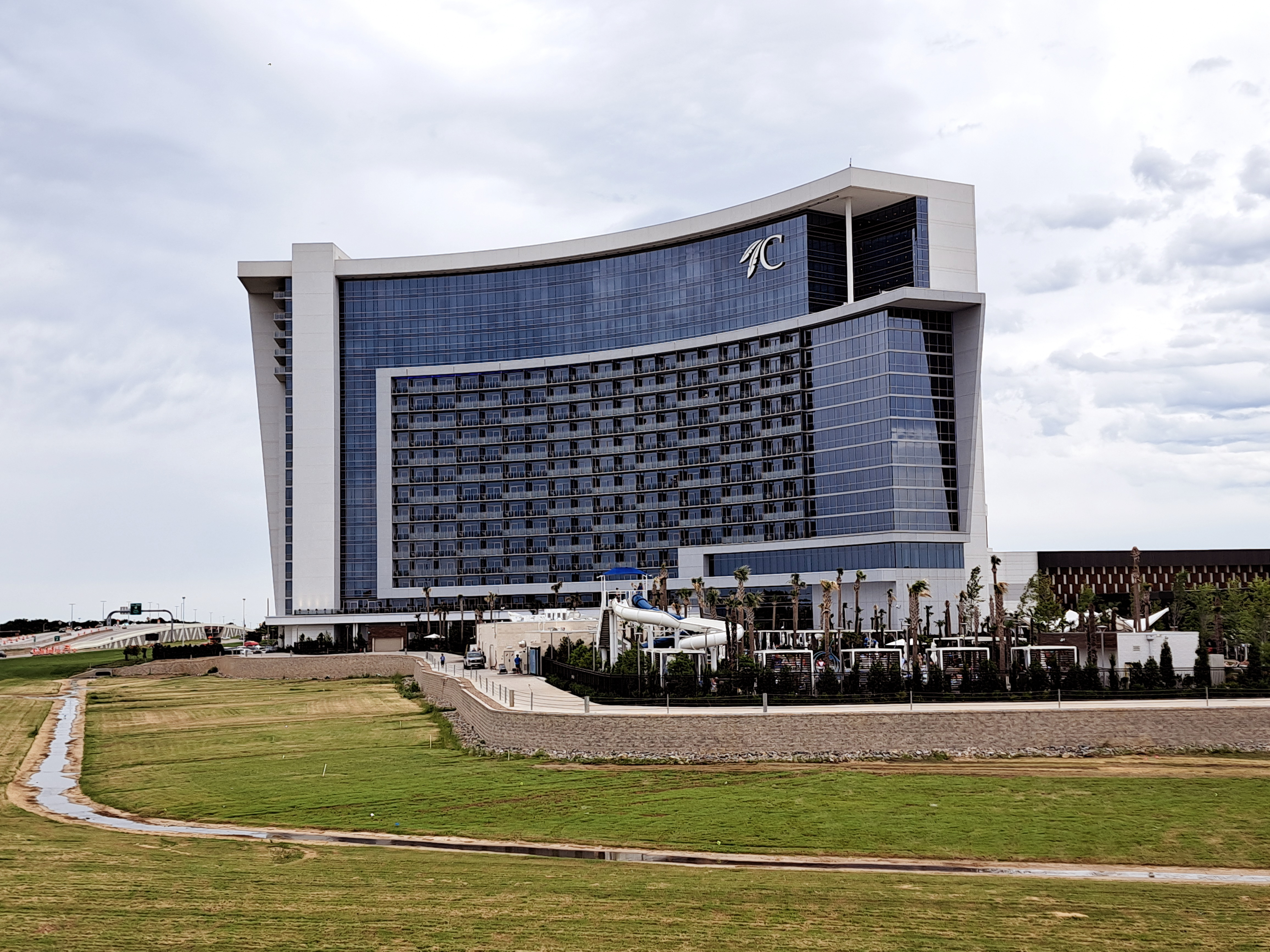
Choctaw Casino in Durant, Oklahoma

The Choctaw Nation's economic impact in 2022 was over $2.51 billion. The nation employs around 12,000 people, of which 4,200 of those work in Durant, the city's largest single employer. Wages and benefits expenditures were over $838 million, with total revenues from tribal businesses and governmental entities was expected to be $2.45 billion in fiscal year 2023.

The nation has contributed to raising Bryan County's per capita income to about $24,000. The Choctaw Nation has helped build water systems and towers, roads and other infrastructure, and has contributed to additional fire stations, EMS units and law enforcement needs that have accompanied economic growth.

The Choctaw Nation operates several types of businesses. It has seven casinos, 14 tribal smoke shops, 13 truck stops, and two Chili's franchises in Atoka and Poteau. It also owns a printing operation, a corporate drug testing service, hospice care, a metal fabrication and manufacturing business, a document backup and archiving business, and a management services company that provides staffing at military bases, embassies and other sites, among other enterprises. McAlester had long been the largest city in the nation, as well its primary business center and economic anchor. However, it was surpassed in population by Durant at the 2020 United States census.

== Health system ==
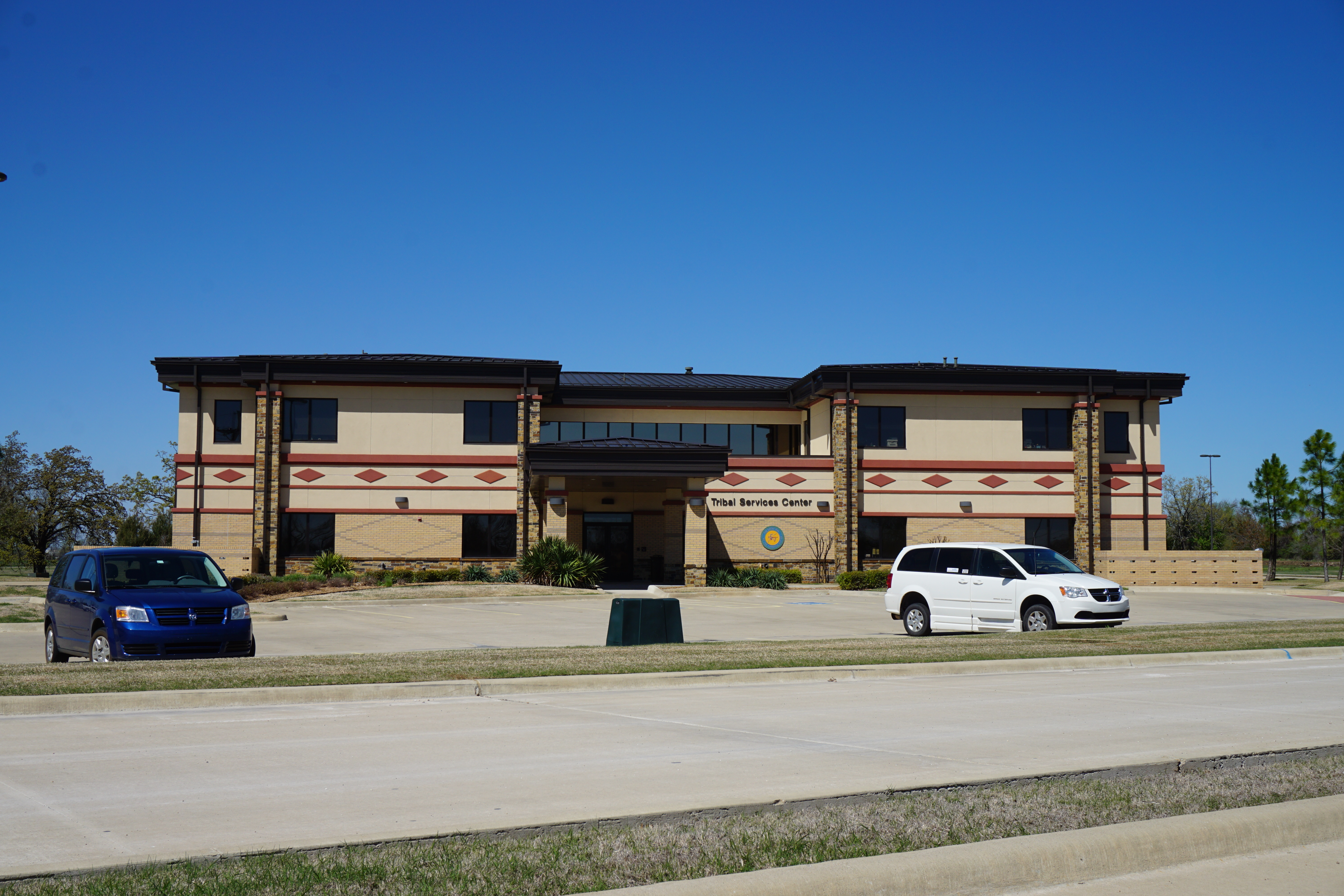
Choctaw Nation Tribal Services Center in Hugo, Oklahoma

The Choctaw Nation is the first Indigenous tribe in the United States to build its own hospital with its own funding. The Choctaw Nation Health Care Center, located in Talihina, is a 145,000-square-foot (13,500 m^{2}) health facility with 37 hospital beds for inpatient care and 52 exam rooms. The $22 million hospital is complete with $6 million worth of state-of-the-art equipment and furnishing. It serves 150,000–210,000 outpatient visits annually. The hospital also houses the Choctaw Nation Health Services Authority, the hub of the tribal health care services of Southeastern Oklahoma.

The tribe also operates eight Indian clinics, one each in Atoka, Broken Bow, Durant, Hugo, Idabel, McAlester, Poteau, and Stigler.

== History ==
=== Treaty of Dancing Rabbit Creek (1830) ===
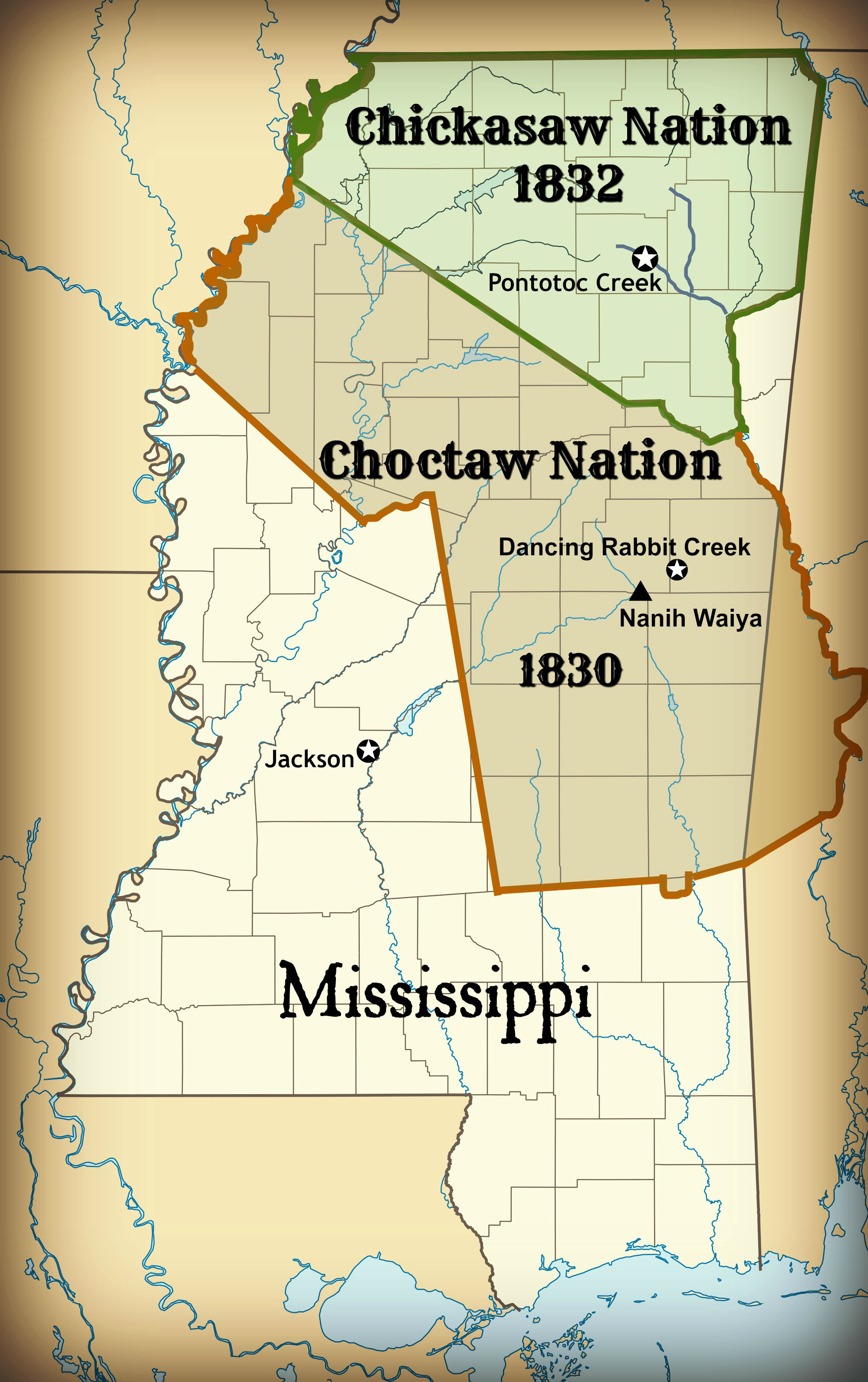
Chickasaw and Choctaw territory in Mississippi; the remaining lands ceded in the 1830s in the Treaty of Pontotoc Creek and the Treaty of Dancing Rabbit Creek

The Choctaw were recognized as a sovereign nation under the protection of the United States with the Treaty of Hopewell in 1786. They were militarily aligned with the United States during the American Revolutionary War, Northwest Indian War, Creek Civil War, and the War of 1812. However, relations soured following the election of Andrew Jackson. At Jackson's personal request, the United States Congress opened a fierce debate on an Indian Removal Bill. In the end, the bill passed, but the vote was very close: The Senate passed the measure, 28 to 19, while in the House it passed, 102 to 97. Jackson signed the legislation into law June 30, 1830, and turned his focus onto the Choctaw in Mississippi Territory.

On August 25, 1830, the Choctaws were supposed to meet with Jackson in Franklin, Tennessee, but Greenwood Leflore, a district Choctaw chief, informed Secretary of War John H. Eaton that the warriors were fiercely opposed to attending. Jackson was angered. Journalist Len Green writes "although angered by the Choctaw refusal to meet him in Tennessee, Jackson felt from LeFlore's words that he might have a foot in the door and dispatched Secretary of War Eaton and John Coffee to meet with the Choctaws in their nation." Jackson appointed Eaton and General John Coffee as commissioners to represent him to meet the Choctaws at the Dancing Rabbit Creek near present-day Noxubee County, Mississippi.

Say to them as friends and brothers to listen [to] the voice of their father, & friend. Where [they] now are, they and my white children are too near each other to live in harmony & peace.... It is their white brothers and my wishes for them to remove beyond the Mississippi, it [contains] the [best] advice to both the Choctaws and Chickasaws, whose happiness... will certainly be promoted by removing.... There... their children can live upon [it as] long as grass grows or water runs.... It shall be theirs forever... and all who wish to remain as citizens [shall have] reservations laid out to cover [their improv]ements; and the justice due [from a] father to his red children will [be awarded to] them. [Again I] beg you, tell them to listen. [The plan proposed] is the only one by which [they can be] perpetuated as a nation.... I am very respectfully your friend, & the friend of my Choctaw and Chickasaw brethren. Andrew Jackson. -Andrew Jackson to the Choctaw & Chickasaw Nations, 1829.

The commissioners met with the chiefs and headmen on September 15, 1830, at Dancing Rabbit Creek. In carnival-like atmosphere, the policy of removal was explained to an audience of 6,000 men, women, and children. The Choctaws would now face migration or submit to US law as citizens. The treaty would sign away the remaining traditional homeland to the US; however, a provision in the treaty made removal more acceptable:

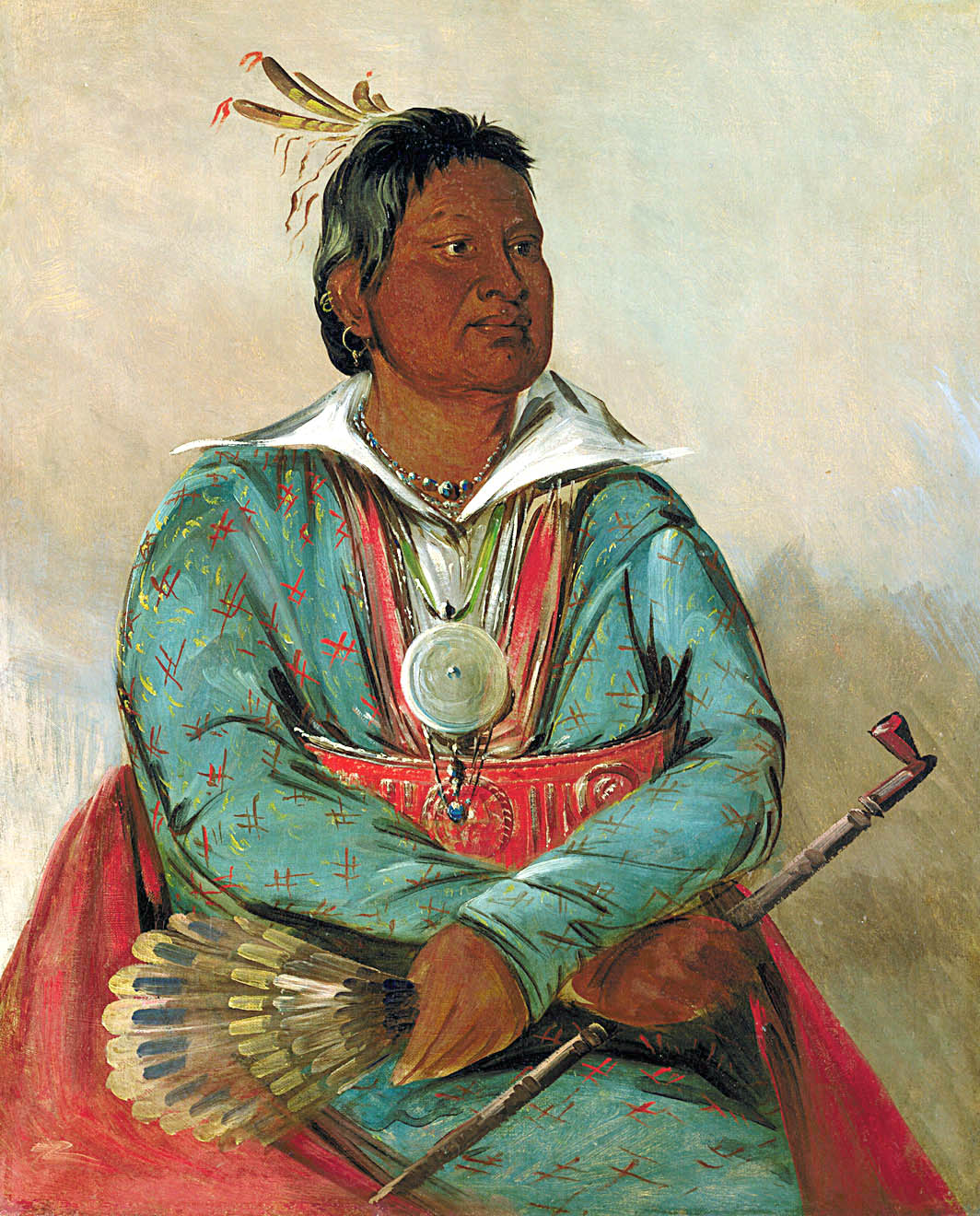
In 1830 Mosholatubbee sought to be elected to the Congress of the United States before moving to Indian Territory. 1834, Smithsonian American Art Museum.

ART. XIV. Each Choctaw head of a family being desirous to remain and become a citizen of the States, shall be permitted to do so, by signifying his intention to the Agent within six months from the ratification of this Treaty, and he or she shall thereupon be entitled to a reservation of one section of six hundred and forty acres of land.... —Treaty of Dancing Rabbit Creek, 1830

On September 27, 1830, the Treaty of Dancing Rabbit Creek was signed. It represented one of the largest transfers of land that was signed between the US government and Native Americans without being instigated by warfare. By the treaty, the Choctaws signed away their remaining traditional homelands, opening them up for European-American settlement. The Choctaw were the first to walk the Trail of Tears. Article XIV allowed for nearly 1,300 Choctaws to remain in the state of Mississippi and to become the first major non-European ethnic group to become US citizens. Article 22 sought to put a Choctaw representative in the U.S. House of Representatives. The Choctaw at this crucial time split into two distinct groups: the Choctaw Nation of Oklahoma and the Mississippi Band of Choctaw Indians. The nation retained its autonomy, but the tribe in Mississippi submitted to state and federal laws.

To the voters of Mississippi. Fellow Citizens:-I have fought for you, I have been by your own act, made a citizen of your state; ... According to your laws I am an American citizen, ... I have always battled on the side of this republic ... I have been told by my white brethren, that the pen of history is impartial, and that in after years, our forlorn kindred will have justice and "mercy too" ... I wish you would elect me a member to the next Congress of the [United] States.-Mushulatubba, Christian Mirror and N.H. Observer, July 1830.

=== Reservation establishment in Oklahoma (1830–1860) ===
Boundaries of the Five Tribes in 1866

The Indian Removal Act, a law implementing Removal Policy, was signed by President Andrew Jackson on May 28, 1830. The act delineated Indian Territory, where the U.S. federal government forcibly relocated tribes from across the United States, including Indigenous peoples of the Southeastern Woodlands (such as the Natchez, Yuchi, Cherokee, Chickasaw, Choctaw, Muscogee, Seminole, Alabama, and Koasati). The forced relocation of the Choctaw Nation in 1831 is called the Trail of Tears. In 1834, U.S. Congress defined the first Indian Territory, with the Five Civilized Tribes occupying the land that eventually became the State of Oklahoma, excluding its panhandle.

=== Influence of Cyrus Kingsbury's Choctaw Mission (1840) ===
The Reverend Cyrus Kingsbury, who had ministered among the Choctaw since 1818, accompanied the Choctaws from the Mayhew Mission in Oktibbeha County, Mississippi, to their new location in Indian Territory. (Note: Mayhew mission was abandoned when the Choctaws left, and remained vacant. The remaining townspeople moved when the Mobile and Ohio Railroad bypassed the community in 1857. Almost nothing except the cemetery and the church remains of the original community.) He established the church in Boggy Depot in 1840. The church building was the temporary capitol of the Choctaw Nation in 1859. Allen Wright (principal chief of the Choctaw Republic from late 1866 to 1870) lived much of his early life with Kingsbury at Doaksville and the mission school at Pine Ridge. Armstrong Academy was founded in Chahta Tamaha, Indian Territory as a school for Choctaw boys in 1844. It was named after William Armstrong, a popular agent of the Choctaws.

=== Great Irish Famine aid (1847) ===
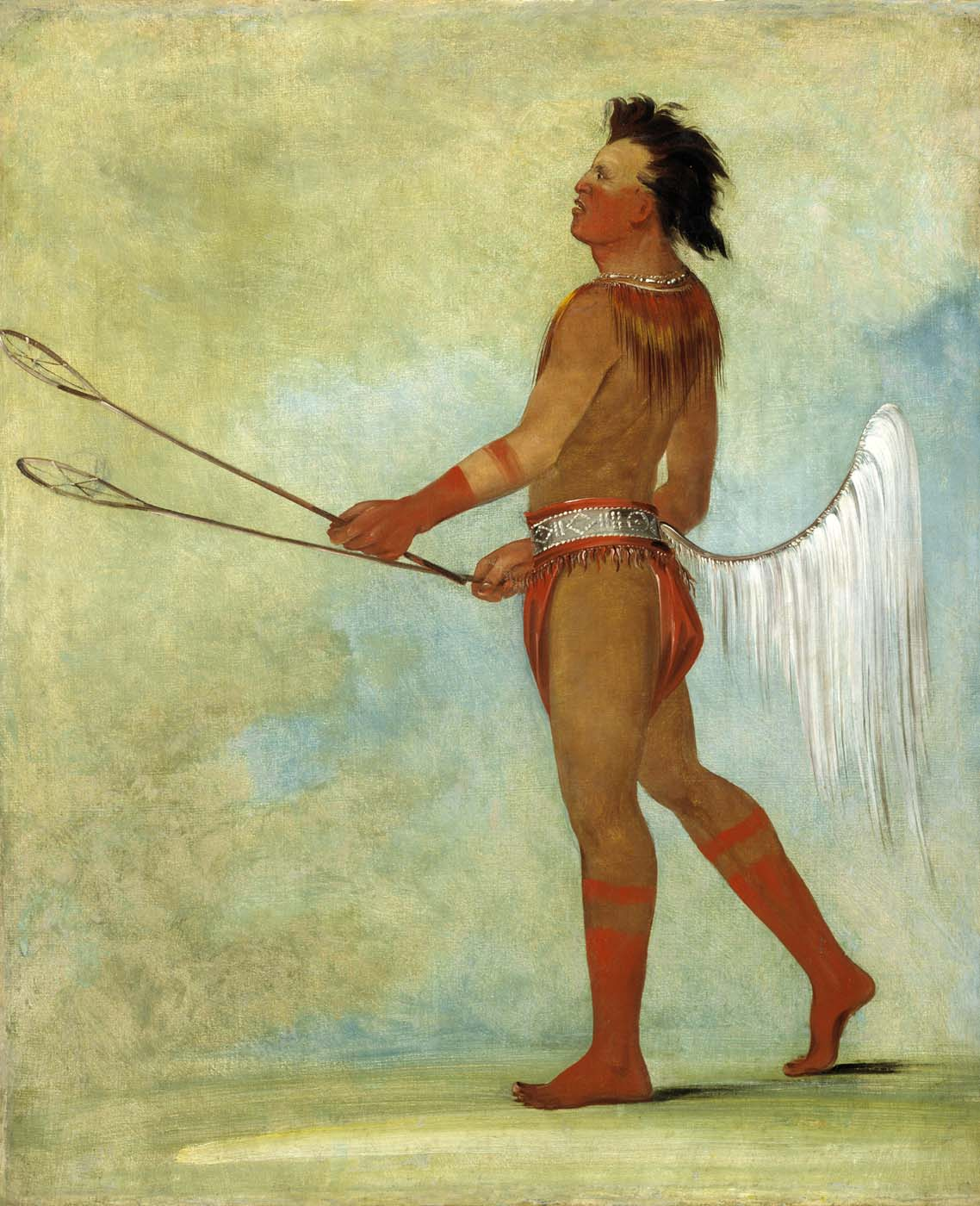
Choctaw Stickball Player, painted by George Catlin, 1834

Midway through the Great Irish Famine (1845–1849), a group of Choctaw collected $170 ($6,000 in current dollar terms) and sent it to help starving Irish men, women and children. "It had been just 16 years since the Choctaw people had experienced the Trail of Tears, and they had faced starvation... It was an amazing gesture. By today's standards, it might be a million dollars," wrote Judy Allen in 1992, editor of the Choctaw Nation of Oklahoma's newspaper, Bishinik. To mark the 150th anniversary, eight Irish people came to the US to retrace the Trail of Tears to raise money for Somalian relief. (Following publication of Angie Debo's The Rise and Fall of the Choctaw Republic, various articles corrected the cited amount of this donation, saying it was $170 ($6,000)).

=== Controversy over slaveholding and separation from Chickasaw Nation (1855) ===
In Spring 1855, the ABCFM sent Dr. George Warren Wood to visit the Choctaw Mission in Oklahoma to resolve a crisis over the abolition issue. After arriving in Stockbridge Mission, Wood spent over two weeks days visiting missions including the Goodwater Mission, Wheelock Academy, Spencer Academy, and other mission schools. He met with missionaries to discuss Selah B Treat's June 22, 1848, letter permitting them to maintain fellowship with slaveholders. Ultimately, the crisis was not resolved, and by 1859, the Board cut ties to the Choctaw mission altogether.

In 1855, the Choctaw and Chickasaw Nations formally separated. Doaksville served as the capital of the Choctaw Nation between 1860 and 1863. An 1860 convention in Doaksville ratified the Doaksville Constitution that guided the Choctaw Nation until 1906. The capital moved to Mayhew Mission in 1859, then to Chahta Tamaha in 1863. The Oklahoma Historical Society claims that Doaksville began to decline in importance in 1854, when the U.S. Army abandoned Fort Towson.

=== American Civil War in Indian Territory (1861–65) ===
Former flag of the Choctaw Nation, adopted in 1860 and later carried by troops during the American Civil War

Although originally neutral, the Choctaws sided with the South during the American Civil War following a May 1861 invasion by Texas forces. Several tribal citizens had become successful cotton planters who enslaved African American people. The most famous Choctaw planter was Robert M. Jones, who had become influential in politics. Jones supported the Confederacy and became a non-voting member in the Confederacy's House of Representatives. Jones was key for steering the tribal council away from the neutrality advocated by Chief George Hudson and Colonel Peter Pitchlynn, and into an alliance with the Confederacy. By 1860, the Choctaw Nation lived in a relatively calm and remote society. Many Indian citizen members had become successful farmers, planters, and business men. Angie Debo, author of The Rise and Fall of the Choctaw Republic, wrote: "Taken as a whole the generation from 1833 to 1861 presents a record of orderly development almost unprecedented in the history of any people."

"The Choctaws alone, of all the Indian nations, have remained perfectly united in their loyalty to this Government. It was said to me by more than one influential and reliable Choctaw during my sojourn in their country that not only had no member of that nation ever gone over to the enemy, but that no Indian had ever done so in whose veins coursed Choctaw blood."

— S.S. Scott to James A. Seddon, January 12, 1863

=== Territory transition to statehood (1900) ===
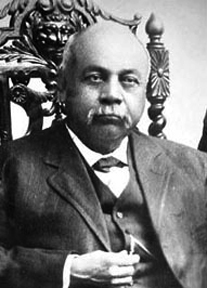
Green McCurtain, the last independent Choctaw Chief before the tribe's annexation by the United States

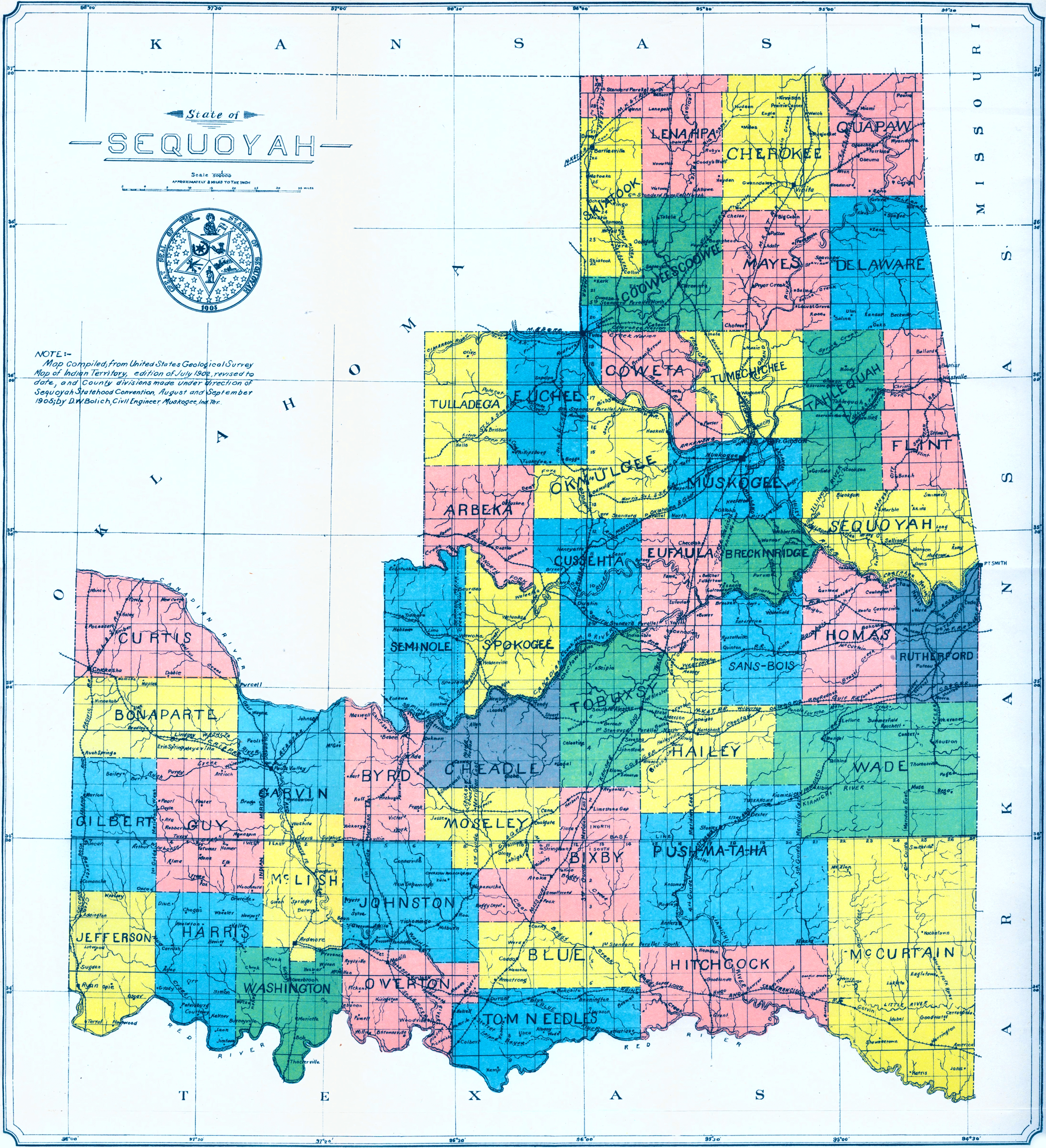
The State of Sequoyah, a U.S. state for Indian Territory proposed in 1905. The Choctaw supported the proposition and were included in the new map. However, the statehood proposal was rejected by Congress and president Theodore Roosevelt.

By the early twentieth century, the United States government had passed laws that reduced the Choctaw's sovereignty and tribal rights in preparation for the extinguishing of land claims and for Indian Territory to be admitted, along with Oklahoma Territory, as part of the State of Oklahoma.

Under the Dawes Act, in violation of earlier treaties, the Dawes Commission registered tribal citizens in official rolls. It forced individual land allotments upon the Tribe's heads of household, and the government classified land beyond these allotments as "surplus", and available to be sold to both native and non-natives. It was primarily intended for European-American (white) settlement and development.

The government created "guardianship" by third parties who controlled allotments while the owners were underage. During the oil boom of the early 20th century, the guardianships became very lucrative; there was widespread abuse and financial exploitation of Choctaw individuals. Charles Haskell, the future governor of Oklahoma, was among the white elite who took advantage of the situation.

The Oklahoma Enabling Act of 1906 led to the full incorporation of Indian Territory into Oklahoma for the purposes of statehood, while the March 4, 1906 implementation of the Curtis Act of 1898 spelled out the final dissolution agreements for all of the Five Civilized Tribes, and thus dissolved the Choctaw government. The Act also set aside a timber reserve, which might be sold at a later time; it specifically excluded coal and asphalt lands from allotment. After Oklahoma was admitted as a state in 1907, tribal chiefs of the Choctaw and other nations were appointed by the Secretary of the Interior.

=== Pioneering the use of code talking (1918) ===
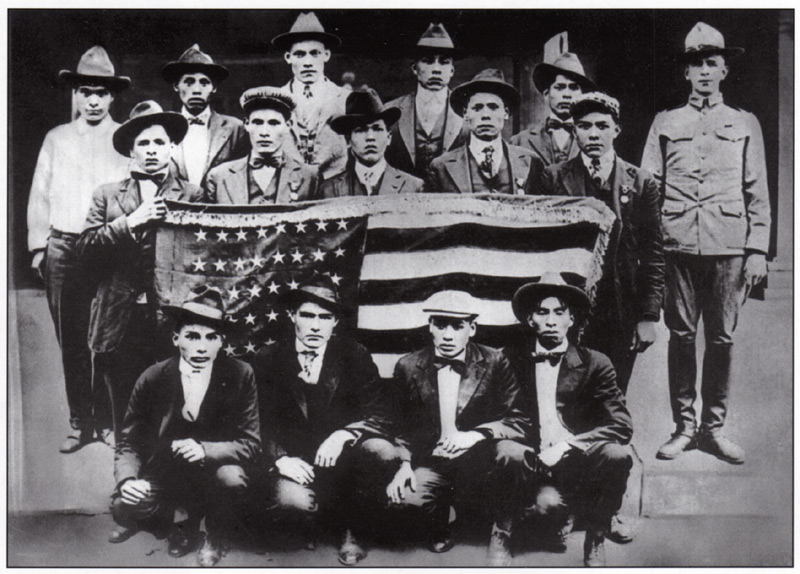
Choctaws in training in World War I for coded radio and telephone transmissions.

During World War I the American army fighting in France became stymied by the Germans' ability to intercept its communications. The Germans successfully decrypted the codes, and were able to read the Americans' secrets and know their every move in advance.

Several Choctaw serving in the 142nd Infantry suggested using their native tongue, the Choctaw language, to transmit army secrets. The Germans were unable to penetrate their language. This change enabled the Americans to protect their actions and almost immediately contributed to a turn-around on the Meuse-Argonne front. Captured German officers said they were baffled by the Choctaw words, which they were completely unable to translate. According to historian Joseph Greenspan, the Choctaw language did not have words for many military ideas, so the code-talkers had to invent other terms from their language. Examples are "'big gun' for artillery, 'little gun shoot fast' for machine gun, 'stone' for grenade and 'scalps' for casualties." Historians credit these soldiers with helping bring World War I to a faster conclusion.

There were 14 Choctaw Code Talkers. The U.S. Army repeated the use of Native Americans as code talkers during World War II, working with soldiers from a variety of American Indian tribes, including the Navajo. Collectively the Native Americans who performed such functions are known as code talkers.

=== U.S. Citizenship (1920s) ===
The Burke Act of 1906 provided that tribal citizens would become full United States citizens within 25 years, if not before. In 1928 tribal leaders organized a convention of Choctaw Nation and Chickasaw Nation tribal citizens from throughout Oklahoma. They met in Ardmore to discuss the burdens being placed upon the tribes due to passage and implementation of the Indian Citizenship Act and the Burke Act. Since their tribal governments had been abolished, the tribes were concerned about the inability to secure funds that were due them for leasing their coal and asphalt lands, in order to provide for their tribe members. Czarina Conlan was selected as chair of the convention. They appointed a committee composed of Henry J. Bond, Conlan, Peter J. Hudson, T.W. Hunter and Dr. E.N. Wright, for the Choctaw; and Ruford Bond, Franklin Bourland, George W. Burris, Walter Colbert and Estelle Ward, for the Chickasaw to determine how to address their concerns.

After meeting to prepare the recommendation, the committee broke with precedent when it sent Czarina Conlan (Choctaw) and Estelle Chisholm Ward (Chickasaw) to Washington to argue in favor of passage of a bill proposed by U.S. House Representative Wilburn Cartwright. It proposed sale of the coal and asphalt holdings, but continuing restrictions against sales of Indian lands. This was the first time that women had been sent to Washington as representatives of their tribes.

=== Termination efforts (1950s) ===
From the late 1940s through the 1960s, the federal government pursued an Indian termination policy, to end the special relationship of tribes. Retreating from the emphasis of self-government of Indian tribes, Congress passed a series of laws to enable the government to end its trust relationships with native tribes. On August 13, 1946, it passed the Indian Claims Commission Act of 1946, Pub. L. No. 79-726, ch. 959. Its purpose was to settle for all time any outstanding grievances or claims the tribes might have against the U.S. for treaty breaches (which were numerous), unauthorized taking of land, dishonorable or unfair dealings, or inadequate compensation on land purchases or annuity payments. Claims had to be filed within a five-year period.

Most of the 370 complaints submitted were filed at the approach of the 5-year deadline in August 1951.

In 1946, the government had appropriated funds for the sale of Choctaw tribal coal and asphalt resources. Though the Choctaw won their case, they were charged by the courts with almost 10% of the $8.5 million award in administrative fees. In 1951, the tribe took advantage of the new law and filed a claim for over $750,000 to recover those fees.

When Harry J. W. Belvin was appointed chief of the Choctaw in 1948 by the Secretary of the Interior, he realized that only federally recognized tribes were allowed to file a claim with the Commission. If he wanted to get that money back, his tribe needed to reorganize and re-establish its government. He created a democratically elected tribal council and a constitution to re-establish a government, but his efforts were opposed by the Area Director of the Bureau of Indian Affairs.

Ultimately, the Choctaw filed a claim with the Claims Commission on a technicality in 1951. The suit was classified as a renewal of the 1944 case against the US Court of Claims, but that did not stop the antagonism between Belvin and the area BIA officials. The BIA had had management issues for decades. Poorly trained personnel, inefficiency, corruption, and lack of consistent policy plagued the organization almost from its founding. For Belvin, relief from BIA oversight of policies and funds seemed as if it might enable the Choctaw to maintain their own traditional ways of operating and to reform their own governing council.

After eleven years as Choctaw chief, Belvin persuaded Representative Carl Albert of Oklahoma to introduce federal legislation to begin terminating the Choctaw tribe. On April 23, 1959, the BIA confirmed that H.R. 2722 had been submitted to Congress at the request of the tribe. It would provide for the government to sell all remaining tribal assets, but would not affect any individual Choctaw earnings. It also provided for the tribe to retain half of all mineral rights, to be managed by a tribal corporation.

On 25 August 1959, Congress passed a bill to terminate the tribe; it was called "Belvin's law" because he was the main advocate behind it. Belvin created overwhelming support for termination among tribespeople through his promotion of the bill, describing the process and expected outcomes. Tribal citizens later interviewed said that Belvin never used the word "termination" for what he was describing, and many people were unaware he was proposing termination. The provisions of the bill were intended to be a final disposition of all trust obligations and a final "dissolution of the tribal governments."

The original act was to have expired in 1962, but was amended twice to allow more time to sell the tribal assets. As time wore on, Belvin realized that the bill severed the tribe citizens' access to government loans and other services, including the tribal tax exemption. By 1967, he had asked Oklahoma Congressman Ed Edmondson to try to repeal the termination act. Public sentiment was changing as well. The Choctaw people had seen what termination could do to tribes, since they witnessed the process with four other tribes in Oklahoma: the Wyandotte Nation, Peoria Tribe of Indians of Oklahoma, Ottawa Tribe of Oklahoma, and Modoc Tribe of Oklahoma. In 1969, ten years after passage of the Choctaw termination bill and one year before the Choctaws were to be terminated, word spread throughout the tribe that Belvin's law was a termination bill. Outrage over the bill generated a feeling of betrayal, and tribal activists formed resistance groups opposing termination. Groups such as the Choctaw Youth Movement (from the nationalist perspective) and some Red Power chapters (from the pan-Indianist perspective) in the late 1960s fought politically against the termination law. They helped create a new sense of tribal pride, especially among younger generations. Their protest delayed termination; Congress repealed the law on August 24, 1970.

=== Self-determination 1970s–present ===
The 1970s were a crucial and defining decade for the Choctaw. To a large degree, the Choctaw repudiated the more extreme Indian activism. They sought a local grassroots solution to reclaim their cultural identity and sovereignty as a nation.

Republican President Richard Nixon, long sympathetic to American Indian rights, ended the government's push for termination. On August 24, 1970, he signed a bill repealing the Termination Act of 1959, before the Choctaw would have been terminated. Some Oklahoma Choctaw organized a grassroots movement to change the direction of the tribal government. In 1971, the Choctaw held their first popular election of a chief since Oklahoma entered the Union in 1907. Nixon stated the tribes had a right to determine their own destiny.

A group calling themselves the Oklahoma City Council of Choctaws endorsed 31-old David Gardner for chief, in opposition to the current chief, 70-year-old Harry Belvin. Gardner campaigned on a platform of greater financial accountability, increased educational benefits, the creation of a tribal newspaper, and increased economic opportunities for the Choctaw people. Amid charges of fraud and rule changes concerning age, Gardner was declared ineligible to run. He did not meet the new minimum age requirement of thirty-five. Belvin was re-elected to a four-year term as chief.

In 1975, thirty-five-year-old David Gardner defeated Belvin to become the Choctaw Nation's second popularly elected chief. 1975 also marked the year that the United States Congress passed the landmark Indian Self-Determination and Education Assistance Act, which had been supported by Nixon before he resigned his office due to the Watergate scandal. This law revolutionized the relationship between Indian Nations and the federal government by providing for nations to make contracts with the BIA, in order to gain control over general administration of funds destined for them.

Native American tribes such as the Choctaw Nation were granted the power to negotiate and contract directly for services, as well as to determine what services were in the best interest of their people. During Gardner's term as chief, a tribal newspaper, Hello Choctaw, was established. In addition, the Choctaw directed their activism at regaining rights to land and other resources. With the Muscogee and Cherokee nations, the Choctaw successfully sued the federal and state government over riverbed rights to the Arkansas River.

Discussions began on the issue of drafting and adopting a new constitution for the Choctaw people. A movement began to increase official enrollment of citizens, increase voter participation, and preserve the Choctaw language. In early 1978, David Gardner died of cancer at the age of 37. Hollis Roberts was elected chief in a special election, serving from 1978 to 1997.

In June 1978 the Bishinik replaced Hello Choctaw as the tribal newspaper. Spirited debates over a proposed constitution divided the people. In May 1979, they adopted a new constitution for the Choctaw nation.

Faced with termination as a sovereign nation in 1970, the Choctaws emerged a decade later as a tribal government with a constitution, a popularly elected chief, a newspaper, and the prospects of an emerging economy and infrastructure that would serve as the basis for further empowerment and growth.

The Choctaw Nation is one of three federally recognized Choctaw tribes; the others are the sizable Mississippi Band of Choctaw Indians, with 10,000 citizens and territory in several communities, and the Jena Band of Choctaw Indians in Louisiana, with a few hundred citizens. The latter two bands are descendants of Choctaw who resisted the forced relocation to Indian Territory. The Mississippi Choctaw preserved much of their culture in small communities and reorganized as a tribal government in 1945 under new laws after the Indian Reorganization Act of 1934.

The U.S. Department of Defense awarded the Secretary of Defense Employer Support Freedom Award to the Choctaw Nation in 2008 for sending 3,500 care packages for U.S. troops stations in Iraq and Afghanistan. This award is the highest recognition given by the U.S. Government to employers for their outstanding support of employees who serve in the National Guard and Reserve.

== Notable tribal citizens ==
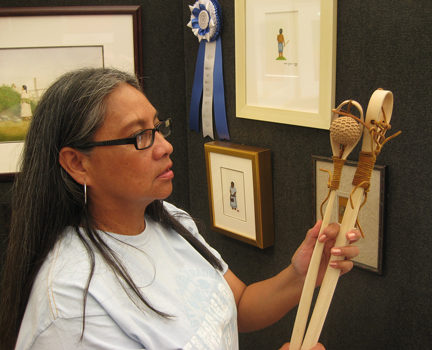
Award-winning painter Norma Howard, whose works depicted traditional Choctaw life

- Lane Adams (b. 1989), Major League Baseball player, Philadelphia Phillies (nephew of Choctaw citizen and attorney Kalyn Free)
- Marcus Amerman (b. 1959), bead, glass, and performance artist
- Tara Astigarraga, software engineer
- Jim Weaver Barnes (b. 1933), poet, writer, rancher, and former professor
- Gary Batton (b. 1966), current Chief of the Choctaw Nation
- Johnny Bench (b. 1947), Major League Baseball player, Cincinnati Reds
- Josh Brecheen (b. 1979), U.S. representative for Oklahoma's 2nd congressional district since 2023
- Ada E. Brown (b. 1974), appointed by President Donald Trump to be a federal judge of the United States District Court for the Northern District of Texas
- Michael Burrage (b. 1950), former U.S. District Judge
- Sean Burrage (b. 1968), President of Southeastern Oklahoma State University
- Steve Burrage (b. 1952), former Oklahoma State Auditor and Inspector
- Tony K. Burris (1929–1951), Medal of honor recipient and soldier in the Korean War
- Clarence Carnes (1927–1988), imprisoned at Alcatraz
- Bobby Cleveland (b. 1943), Sunday School teacher, former member of the Oklahoma House of Representatives
- Czarina Conlan (1871–1958), archivist, suffragist, first woman to represent the Choctaw in Washington D.C., and first woman elected to a school board in Oklahoma
- Samantha Crain (b. 1986), singer-songwriter, musician
- Gilbert Dukes (1849–1919), Justice of the Choctaw Supreme Court from 1885 to 1889, and Chief from 1900 to 1902, candidate for Oklahoma lieutenant governor in 1910
- William A. Durant (1866–1948), former Chief, sergeant-at-arms at the 1906 Oklahoma constitutional convention, 3rd Speaker of the Oklahoma House of Representatives
- Scott Fetgatter (b. 1968), member of the Oklahoma House of Representatives
- Shug Fisher (1907–1984), singer, musician, and comedian
- Tobias William Frazier, Sr. (1892–1975), Choctaw code talker
- Kalyn Free, attorney
- Avery Frix, businessman and member of the Oklahoma Senate
- Bill Grant, Bluegrass musician
- Rosella Hightower (1920–2008), prima ballerina
- Norma Howard (1958–2024), painter and visual artist
- LeAnne Howe (b. 1951), writer and academic
- Rhoda Pitchlynn Howell (1814–1911), rancher and community leader
- Victor Locke, Jr. (1876–1943), first Roman Catholic chief, served from 1910 to 1918
- Phil Lucas (1942–2007), filmmaker
- Green McCurtain (1848–1910), Chief from 1896 to 1900, and again from 1902 to 1910, served as Vice President of the Sequoyah Constitutional Convention in 1905
- Jane Austin McCurtain (1842–1924), educator and political advisor
- James McDonald (c. 1801–1831), first Native American lawyer
- Cal McLish (1925–2010), Major League Baseball pitcher
- Devon A. Mihesuah (b. 1957), author, historian, former editor of the American Indian Quarterly
- Joseph Oklahombi (1895–1960), Choctaw code talker
- Peter Pitchlynn (1806–1881), Ambassador, Head of the Lighthorse, Chief from 1864 to 1866
- Gregory E. Pyle (1949–2019), former Chief who initiated the Choctaw Language Program
- Hollis E. Roberts (1943–2011), Red Power reformist, former Chief
- Charles Shadle (b. 1960), classical composer and Senior Lecturer in Music at the Massachusetts Institute of Technology
- William Grady Stigler (1891–1952), U.S. Representative from Oklahoma's 2nd Congressional District, 1944–52
- Bryan Terry (b. 1968), member of the Tennessee House of Representatives from the 48th district
- Tim Tingle (b. 1948), writer and storyteller
- Wilma Victor (1919–1987), educator, first lieutenant in Women's Army Corps (1943–1946), special assistant to Secretary of the Interior Rogers Morton
- Karina Walters (b. 1964), social epidemiologist and health promotion scholar
- Summer Wesley (b. 1981), attorney, writer, and activist
- Wallace Willis (1820–1880), Choctaw slave and Freedmen owned by Britt Willis, composer of Negro spirituals, including Swing Low, Sweet Chariot and Roll, Jordan, Roll
- Jonathan Wingard (b. 1982), dairy farmer, grassroots activist, member of the Oklahoma Senate
- Allen Wright (1826–1885), chief from 1866 to 1870
- Harriet Wright O'Leary (1916–1999), teacher, first woman to serve on the tribal council
- Muriel Hazel Wright (1889–1975), teacher, historian, former editor of the Chronicles of Oklahoma

== See also ==
- Choctaw code talkers, World War I veterans who provided a secure means of communication in their language; first Native American code talkers
- Choctaw culture
- Choctaw mythology
- Choctaw Trail of Tears
- Jena Band of Choctaw Indians, Louisiana
- Mississippi Band of Choctaw Indians
- List of Indian reservations
