= Jane Austin =

Jane Austin may refer to:

- Misspelling of Jane Austen (1775–1817), English writer
- Jane G. Austin (1831–1894), American writer
- Jane Austin McCurtain (née Austin, 1842–1924), Choctaw teacher
