= Jane Austin McCurtain =

Choctaw teacher and politician

Hokni Jane Austin McCurtain
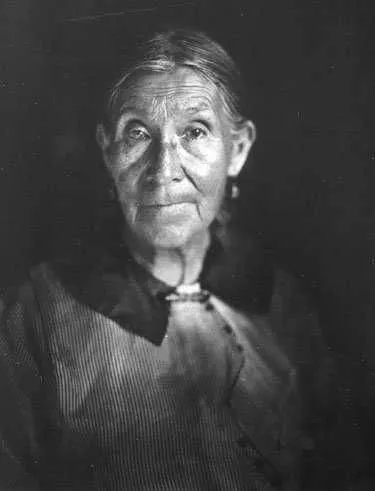
- McCurtain in 1913

Custodian of the Choctaw Council House
- In office 1907–1924
- Preceded by: Position established
- Succeeded by: Position abolished

Superintendent of Jones Academy
- In office 1894–1898
- Preceded by: Simon T. Dwight
- Succeeded by: Position abolished

Personal details
- Born: August 19, 1842 Doaksville, Choctaw Nation
- Died: October 27, 1924 (aged 82) Tuskahoma, Oklahoma, U.S.
- Citizenship: Choctaw Nation; American
- Party: Progressive Party
- Spouse: Jackson McCurtain (m. 1865; died 1885)
- Children: 5
- Education: Wheelock Female Academy; Edgeworth Seminary
- Occupation: teacher, political advisor

Jane Austin McCurtain (August 19, 1842 – October 27, 1924) was a Choctaw educator and political advisor within the Choctaw Nation, known for her influence on educational and tribal governance throughout her life. Serving as a close advisor to her husband, chief Jackson McCurtain, and later to his successors, she held key roles in Choctaw education, including as superintendent of Jones Academy, and remained active in Choctaw political affairs until her death, serving as custodian of the Choctaw Council House in Tuskahoma.

== Early life and education ==
Jane Austin was born on August 19, 1842, in Doaksville, Choctaw Nation near Fort Towson, to Lewis Austin, a full-blood Choctaw with mechanical inclinations who owned mills, gins, and a tannery, and Mollie Webster, who was of mixed Choctaw and white ancestry. Her parents had relocated west as part of the Trail of Tears. Her father established the first shoe factory in Indian Territory. Her family prioritized education, and at age eleven in 1853, McCurtain attended the Wheelock Female Academy, a school founded by reverend Alfred Wright in 1832 to prepare Choctaw girls to be Christian women. McCurtain's academic performance at Wheelock earned her a scholarship to Edgeworth’s Seminary in Pittsburgh, Pennsylvania.

In 1860, as tensions of the American Civil War grew, she returned home from Edgeworth Seminary in what became a two-month journey back to her Choctaw homeland.

== Career ==
McCurtain began her career in education in 1861 by teaching at a Choctaw school near Doaksville. However, her teaching tenure was interrupted by the Civil War, which caused the closure of Choctaw schools from 1861 to 1865. During this time, she met Jackson McCurtain, a captain in the Confederate States Army, serving with the First Regiment of Choctaw and Chickasaw Mounted Rifles. They married in November 1865 after the war's end, marking the beginning of a lifelong partnership that shaped much of the Choctaw Nation’s political landscape.

Following their marriage, the McCurtains settled near Antlers, Oklahoma, where Jackson was elected as a senator in the Choctaw Council, eventually becoming its president in 1870. When chief Isaac Garvin died, Jackson succeeded him as chief, a position he was elected to in 1880 and again in 1882. McCurtain served as a secretary, speechwriter, and close political advisor to her husband, contributing to Choctaw position papers and demonstrating strong support for her people. In 1883, when Tuskahoma was chosen as the Choctaw government seat, the McCurtain family moved there as the capitol building was being constructed. After her husband Jackson died in 1885, she continued serving as an advisor to her two brothers-in-law, chiefs Edmund and Green McCurtain.

In 1894, McCurtain was appointed superintendent of Jones Academy, a boarding school for Choctaw boys near Hartsorne, Oklahoma. She held this role until 1895, when the Atoka Agreement transferred control of Choctaw schools to the U.S. government, which led to her dismissal along with other Choctaw administrators.

After Oklahoma gained statehood in 1907, the Choctaw Council House was no longer in legislative use, and McCurtain was appointed its custodian. She remained in this position until her death in 1924, using her influence to advise Choctaw leaders on legislation from her residence near the Council House at Tuskahoma. While she never held political office, she was influential in Choctaw politics and one of the first women active in Choctaw politics.

== Personal life ==
McCurtain and her husband had five children. Following her husband’s death in 1885, she continued to reside near the Tuskahoma Council House, where she maintained a leadership role among her community, promoting education and cultural preservation. Known as "Aunt Jane," she held gatherings for Choctaw girls from nearby schools and advocating for their education with the slogan, “Educate the boys and girls for leadership. The time is coming when we shall need them." McCurtain died on October 27, 1924 and was buried in Tuskahoma.
