= Doaksville, Choctaw Nation =

Ghost town in Choctaw County, Oklahoma

Coordinates: 34.0358°N 95.0717°W

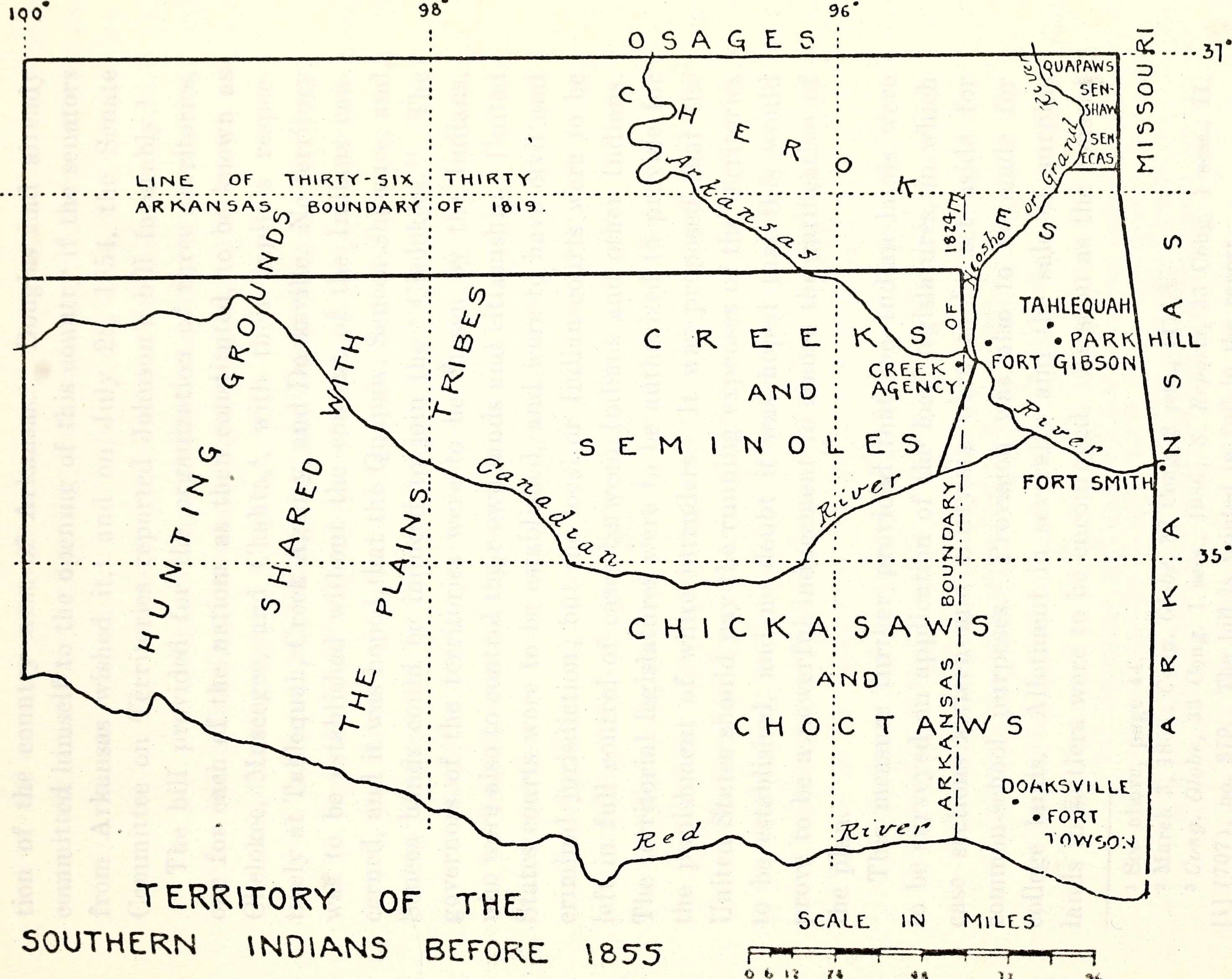
Map of Indian Territory, Doaksville at bottom right

Doaksville is a former settlement, now a ghost town, located in present-day Choctaw County, Oklahoma. It was founded between 1824 and 1831, by people of the Choctaw Indian tribe who were forced to leave their homes in the Southeastern United States and relocate in an area designated for their resettlement in Indian Territory. The community was named for Josiah Stuart Doak, co-owner of the local trading post. The town flourished until the U.S. Army abandoned nearby Fort Towson in 1854, though it remained as the Choctaw capital until 1859, then declined precipitately after being bypassed by a new railroad in 1870. It is now a ghost town and an archaeological preservation site.

== History ==
Accessibility to steamboat traffic on the Red River made Doaksville a principal town of the Choctaw Nation in the Indian Territory. In the 1820s and 30s, it was a major destination for Choctaws who were required to move from their homes in the Southeast and move to Indian Territory. Josiah and his brother originally established the post at the mouth of the Kiamichi River, then relocated one mile west of the Fort Towson-Doaksville Cemetery, after the U.S. Army established Fort Towson in 1824. The community began significant growth in 1831, when the Army reactivated Fort Towson nearby, across the creek to the east.

In 1837, the Chickasaws and the Choctaws signed the Treaty of Doaksville, which allowed the Chickasaw Nation to lease the western part of the Choctaw Nation for settlement.

By 1840, the town had several stores, a gristmill, a blacksmith and a hotel. The Choctaw agent, William Armstrong, reported in 1842 on the unusual nature of the town:

(It) is one of the most orderly and quiet towns that you will find in the west. There is a resident physician, a good tavern, blacksmith shop, wagon maker and wheelwright. A church has been erected. A temperance society has been organized which numbers a large population of the most respectable Choctaws and Chickasaws as well as our own population. I have been in this village a week at a time without seeing anything like ardent spirits or a drunken Indian.

A post office opened in Doaksville in 1847.

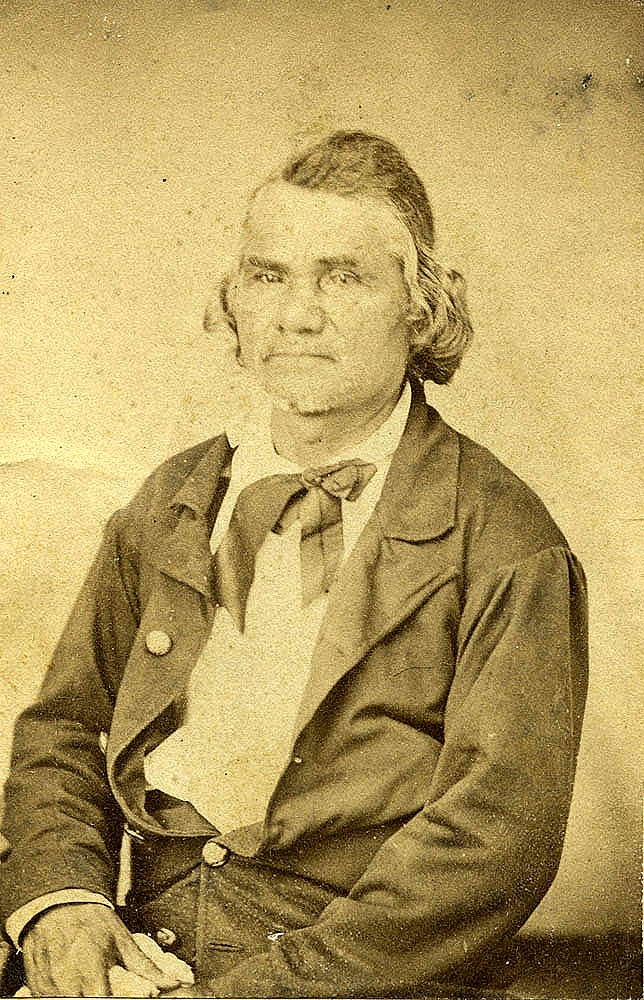
Gen. Stand Watie

By 1850, it was the largest town in Indian Territory. It then had more than thirty buildings (Note: The count included stores, a jail, a school and a hotel.) There were two newspapers, at least one of which, the Choctaw Intelligencer, was printed in the Choctaw language. In 1855, the Choctaw and Chickasaw Nations formally separated. Doaksville served as the capital of the Choctaw Nation between 1860 and 1863. An 1860 convention in Doaksville ratified the Doaksville Constitution that guided the Choctaw Nation until 1906. The capital moved to Mayhew Mission in 1859, then to Chahta Tamaha in 1863., The Oklahoma Historical Society claims that Doaksville began to decline in importance in 1854, when the U.S. Army abandoned Fort Towson.

Confederate General Stand Watie surrendered his command at Doaksville on June 23, 1865. (Note: At least one source claims the surrender occurred after the "Battle of Doaksville," However, there was no battle by that name.) After the war, Doaksville declined economically. The war had destroyed the plantation-based economy of the surrounding area. In 1870 a railroad line bypassed Doaksville, causing most businesses to move to the town of Fort Towson, which was on the rail line. One source claims that the town disappeared during the 1890s. The post office closed in 1903. Nothing remains of the town except the cemetery.

== Current status ==
The Oklahoma Historical Society acquired the Doaksville site in 1960 and sponsored archaeological digs during the 1990s. It maintains an archeological preservative site at Doaksville. A walkway and explanatory signs were put in place during 2001, so that visitors can view the foundations of several structures and many artifacts that were discovered during digs in 1995, 1996 and 1997.

A site known as the Doaksville Site (NRID = 75001561) in the town of Fort Towson, Oklahoma was added to the National Register of Historic Places on May 29, 1975.

== Notable people ==
- Jane Austin McCurtain (1842–1924), educator and political advisor

== See also ==
- List of ghost towns in Oklahoma
