= Cornelius McCurtain =

District chief of the Moshulatubbee District of the Choctaw Nation
- In office 1850–1854
- Preceded by: Peter Folsom
- Succeeded by: Nicholas Cochnauer

Personal details
- Born: March 5, 1803 Choctaw Nation, Mississippi Territory, U.S.
- Died: March 4, 1871 (aged 67) Choctaw Nation, Indian Territory
- Citizenship: Choctaw Nation
- Spouse: Mahayia Bevlin
- Children: Jackson McCurtain; Green McCurtain; Edmund McCurtain

Cornelius McCurtain (1803-1871) was a Choctaw politician who served as the district chief of the Moshulatubbee District from 1850 to 1854.

== Biography ==
Cornelius McCurtain was born in the Choctaw Nation within Mississippi Territory on March 5, 1803, to Daniel McCurtain and Hannah Cole. Daniel McCurtain was the son of an Irish immigrant of the same name who had fought in the American Revolution and Celia Jane, a member of the Choctaw tribe. Hannah Cole's mother, Shamoka, was Chakchiuma. He married Mahayia Bevlin in 1826. The couple had seven children: Jackson, Sina, Isabelle, Edmund, David, Greenwood, and Elsie. He moved to Indian Territory in 1822 and settled near Fort Coffee. In 1849 he was elected district chief of the Moshulatubbee District and he served from 1850 to 1854. He died on March 5, 1871, in the Choctaw Nation in Indian Territory.
