= Basil LeFlore =

Governor of the Choctaw Nation (1811–1886)

Governor of the Choctaw Nation
- In office 1859–1860
- Preceded by: Tandy Walker
- Succeeded by: Position abolished George Hudson (as Principal Chief)

Personal details
- Born: 1811 Choctaw Nation
- Died: October 15, 1886 (aged 74–75) Goodland, Indian Territory
- Party: Skullyville

Basil LeFlore (c.1811 - 15 October 1886) was the last elected governor of the Choctaw Nation. He was the brother of former District Chief Greenwood LeFlore. He was one of three Choctaw leaders who used the title governor following the introduction of the controversial 1857 Choctaw Constitution. LeFlore was elected leader by the portion of the Choctaw Nation that supported the 1857 Constitution known as the Skullyville Constitution. Leflore was replaced by George Hudson who under the new 1860 Constitution became Principal Chief and the position of Governor was eliminated.

LeFlore would remain politically significant even in the government formed under the new constitution. He later served as the nation's auditor until his death. Later chiefs would often be referred to as Governor but that was not the official designation as determined by the Constitution of 1860.

== Biography ==
LeFlore was of mixed Choctaw and French ancestry, but he was brought up among his mother's people as a Choctaw. In their matrilineal kinship system, children were considered born to the mother's people and took their social status from her family. LeFlore attended the mission school at Brainard, Mississippi. For several years he attended the Johnson Indian School in Kentucky.

After the Choctaw were forced out of Mississippi by the United States under the Indian Removal Act, LeFlore moved with his people to Indian Territory in 1831. He soon held a high place in the councils of his people. In 1859, LeFlore was elected to the position of Governor following the completed term of Alfred Wade which was finished by Tandy Walker. LeFlore was involved with the Constitutional Convention of January 1860, and abdicated power to the newly elected Principal Chief, George Hudson.

LeFlore was a member of the Methodist Church and was well educated. He was said to adopt the European-American life. The Choctaw are one of the Five Civilized Tribes of the American Southeast, and had adopted certain United States customs that they thought were useful.
