= James McDonald (lawyer) =

Lawyer

James L. McDonald
- Born: 1801; Choctaw Tribal Territory
- Died: 1831 (aged 29–30); Jackson, Mississippi
- Occupation: Lawyer
- Known for: Activism on behalf of Choctaw Nation
- Movement: Choctaw nationalism Anti-Jacksonianism

James Lawrence McDonald (c. 1801 — September 1831) was a member of the Choctaw Nation and the first Native leader of his generation to be trained in the American legal system. Thus, he is known as the first Native American lawyer. He was also the first Native activist to make the case for Indian rights directly to American political leaders and to negotiate for those rights in a formal agreement. McDonald did not believe in the use of force in resisting American westward expansion. Instead, he believed that political negotiations between Native American leaders and the United States would be more effective in the fight against the displacement of Natives and would allow for the long-term survival of Native American communities. McDonald urged the U.S. Congress to protect the rights of Native Americans and delayed the removal of his tribe from ancestral lands. As an advisor to Choctaw chiefs and eventual lawyer of the tribe, McDonald successfully negotiated peace treaties with the United States federal government. These negotiations allowed fair compensation for previously ceded land that was undervalued in earlier agreements. He also promoted programs of Indian education and wrote on behalf of the elected tribal governments. McDonald’s work as a lawyer and political activist paved a new path in which future Native American leaders were able to defend the rights of their territory using the American legal system. His career marked the birth of a new approach to federal power, and by extension, the beginning of political activism that was to inspire tribal leaders across the continent.

== Early life and education ==
James McDonald was born in his tribe's homeland in 1801, which is in present-day Mississippi. He had a European father and a Native American mother, Molly McDonald, who was a Choctaw landowner and a trader. McDonald was bilingual since he was able to speak both his tribe's language and English. McDonald was of mixed heritage but was still considered to be a natural-born member of the Choctaw tribe. During the post-Revolution era, it was not uncommon for Native Americans to place their children into white households. Many American Indian communities saw significant utility in placing their children among American whites for schooling. In 1811, Molly McDonald placed her eleven-year-old son in the home of Silas Dinsmoor, a U.S. government official who served as a federal liaison between the Choctaw Nation and the federal government. Native American families allowed this "adoption" typically to allow for children to learn the customs and practices of the whites, with the expectation that they would return to the people and use these practices to their advantage.

Officials from the American Board missionaries reported that attempts to give Indians an English education had not been very successful as many students went home to their "amusements and former follies." Consequently, most of white society believed that Indians could not be educated. After living with Silas for two years and attending school, McDonald was seen to be a prime example of an educated Native American. James L. McDonald gained the attention of other prominent figures of the time, such as Thomas L. McKenney, the U.S. superintendent of Indian Trade. To continue his education, James was sent to Baltimore, Maryland, where the Yearly Meeting of Friends took charge of his upbringing. Using McDonald's success as his example, McKenney argued that providing education for Native Americans would allow them to assimilate faster into the American mainstream customs and practices. Philip E. Thomas, secretary for the Maryland school, wrote the War Department and stated that the school had received McDonald “for the purpose of promoting the civilization of the Indian natives, (by the Government)... to be educated.”

When McDonald graduated school in 1818, McKenney offered him a job at the Office of Indian Trade. Their relationship as federal employees evolved into friendship, and the Superintendent treated the young Choctaw as an adopted son by giving him a home and a "white job." During his time with the department, McDonald continued to take various classes and worked at a local Dry-Goods store. In an 1819 letter, McDonald writes that he had "spent 20 months learning business at the store, received an education in surveying, attended a course of lectures on Natural & Experimental Philosophy, learned Latin, and partially studied 'Mechanics and Astronomy'". McDonald continued to learn about business, culture, and economics. While working in Washington, D.C., McDonald was constantly impressing his superiors with his hard work, his dedication, and his skill. In 1819, McKenney wrote Secretary of War, John C. Calhoun, about McDonald's academic progress and his encouraging of McDonald to attend law school. In the letter, which included McDonald's letter, McDonald declined any desire to attend law school. Instead, he expressed a desire to

Travel to his home in the Choctaw Nation and farm for the government. He also stated that the nostalgia of being reared on a farm beckoned. Yet, he closed, "But I must confess, I have some ambition to distinguish myself, some disposition to be useful, and a desire to free the character educated Indian Youth (with some degree of Justice cast upon it) of a proneness to relapse into Savagism.”

== Legal career ==
After much pressure, McKenney enrolled McDonald into a Georgetown academy where McDonald could further his legal education. McDonald completed his legal training in Ohio in 1823 but was unable to obtain a job at a law firm. He thus returned to settle in Mississippi. During this time, there was a growing increase of confrontation between the southern states and the local Native tribes.

=== Doak's Stand Treaty of 1820 ===
The Choctaws ceded approximately six million acres on the western edge of the Choctaw Nation in exchange for approximately thirteen million acres in Arkansas Territory. In exchange, the federal government agreed to use the profits from the sale of the Mississippi lands to construct Choctaw schools for the tribe's youth. The treaty embodied the "important object" of Indian Policy, "to promote the civilization of the Choctaw Indians." To the disappointment of the tribe, this arrangement did not come to fruition. The government did not sell the lands to provide the financial support for schools promised in the treaty. It was revealed that American leaders no longer respected the treaties made between the United States and the Native tribes. Native Americans then had to depend on lawyers to make sure that American officials were not violating treaty agreements and their duties.

=== Property Dispute ===
McDonald used his law education in the defense of his mother's property rights, "an indemnity to which [she] was entitled under the fourth sections of the Indian trade law." James' mother had purchased a slave using credit and still owed some money on the purchase. When collectors prematurely came for the balance, she was unable to pay. As a result, her "property" was taken out of her possession. She complained to her son, who then contacted Calhoun about the reciprocity and government protection if they were Indians' private property; months later she received compensation for the slave. As a consequence of this dispute, McDonald understood the potential impact regarding his role in Indian affairs. He thus used his government funded education to aid the Choctaw cause for survival in the East.

=== Choctaw Delegation, 1824 ===
In November 1824, McDonald wrote Calhoun about Choctaw opinions that concerned ceding land and protection by Federal law. He stated that tribal leaders knew that fertile soil and prime hunting characterized their lands. Some Choctaws settled in the western Arkansas territory but the majority of Choctaw were not interested in moving, either because of reports that the land was poor and sterile or reports that there were white men living in parts of the territory. The federal government would need to renegotiate the boundaries of the Doak's Stand Treaty to satisfy white settlers. John Calhoun was actively campaigning for the presidency, and hoped that securing ceded lands for Mississippi would give him a political advantage. The Choctaw leaders, Pushmataha and Mushulatubbee, were in debt to Choctaw warriors for their service in Jackson, Pensacola in 1814 and were inclined to cede some land to pay their debt. Calhoun agreed to meet with Choctaw leaders in Washington to negotiate a treaty. The members involved in this process included Choctaw tribal leaders and James L. McDonald who served as both interpreter and legal aide.

During initial negotiations Choctaw delegates agreed for a cession that would move the eastern boundary of the Arkansas to the Red River, with the proviso that white settlers remaining in their territory would either move or be moved by the government. They rejected Calhoun's offer of $65,000 in annuities and countered with a proposal of $30,000 in gifts, $9,000 annually for 20 years for mechanical institutions, the same amount of the education of Choctaw children in “colleges or institutions out of the nations and $3,000 annually for 20 years for education of the Western Choctaws. President Monroe found the Choctaw proposal "wholly inadmissible."

Neither the Choctaw leaders or U.S. officials were pleased with the opposing offers and negotiations between the two stalled. During these stalled negotiations, Pushmataha died and, along the initial journey to Washington, the other Choctaw leaders also died. This left the negotiations to mixed-blood Indians, David Folsom, Robert Cole, and James L. McDonald—who believed that the access of education would allow the next generation of Choctaws to compete with the expectations of American society. They bargained for guarantees of boundaries and education and secured significant gains for the Choctaw community. Monroe raised the U.S. governments' offer to $90,000 in the annuities over ten years and the delegation demanded settlement from the claims of the Doak's Stand Treaty and $6,000 a year in perpetuity. President Monroe agreed to these terms and to honor the funding of Choctaw schools arranged in the treaty of 1820. With the treaty signed on January 22, 1825, the Choctaw were also promoted into a cash economy as they were to receive their annuities in cash rather than goods.

=== Declaration to Congress, 1825 ===
In early 1825, McDonald led the Choctaw delegation as the author of an open letter to Congress and as one of the seven signatories. In this declaration, McDonald acknowledged the United States' growing power and admitted that "the time must come" when [Indians] would be "made to become like white men" but the tribe was "not doomed to extinction". He wrote that even though Indians were becoming like white men, they would not cease being American Indians. He also argued that the federal government had a duty to protect tribal rights based on the founding principles of liberty and equality. He concluded that the nation's deepest political commitments to these principles would ensure the protection of the Choctaws' rights. He believed that race should not be a factor in relations between the Native American tribes and the United States, but instead the rule of American law.

=== Treaty of Dancing Rabbit Creek, 1830 ===
This treaty is the first of a series of treaties that would commit several Native American tribes to the Indian Removal Act. McDonald was in attendance for closing negotiations and even signed the agreement. During negotiations, McDonald reported that the Secretary of War, John Eaton and other federal representatives at first accepted his group's proposal but then unexpectedly substituted a new government draft in a final meeting with tribal leaders and demanded their acceptance. He later expressed regret in his participation.

== Death ==
McDonald died in September or early October 1831. He is reported to have drowned in the Pearl River, at the age of 30 or 31, near his mother's home near Jackson. As written in the Mississippi Encyclopedia, Digital History, and other scholarly articles, McDonald's death is often written about as an apparent suicide. In October 1831, the American Board missionary wrote that McDonald "had been indulging in his dissipated habits and he drowned himself, having previously expressed the conviction that 'his damnation was sealed.". In his 1848 memoirs Thomas McKenney suggested that after a white woman in Jackson rejected his proposal for marriage, "with promptness, and, as he thought, with scorn," McDonald, "rushed to the river, sprang off a bluff and drowned himself!" In the book, Indians in the Family, Dawn Peterson suggests that McDonald may have created enemies in the South later in his life with his outspoken and unpopular political opinions against Jacksonian politics. There is no way to determine the true cause of McDonald's death.
