= Green McCurtain =

Choctaw statesman (1848–1910)

Greenwood McCurtain
- Ititʋpa Okchamali
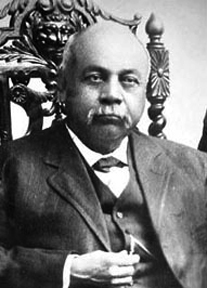

Principal Chief of the Choctaw Nation
- In office 1902–1910
- Nominated by: Theodore Roosevelt (Note: In 1906, he was appointed to the office for the later portion of his term.)
- Preceded by: Gilbert Dukes
- Succeeded by: Victor Locke Jr.
- In office 1896–1900
- Preceded by: Jefferson Gardner
- Succeeded by: Gilbert Dukes

Member of the Choctaw Senate from the Moshulatubbee District
- In office 1893–1896
- Constituency: Iskvlli Kaunti

Choctaw National Treasurer
- In office 1888–1892

Trustee of schools for the Moshulatubbee District
- In office 1880–1884

Member of the Choctaw National Council from the Moshulatubbee District
- In office 1874–1880
- Constituency: Iskvlli Kaunti

Sheriff of Skullyville County
- In office 1872–1874

Personal details
- Born: November 28, 1848 Skullyville, Choctaw Nation
- Died: December 27, 1910 (aged 62) Kinta, Oklahoma, U.S.
- Citizenship: Choctaw Nation; American
- Party: Tuskahoma Party
- Other political affiliations: Republican
- Parent: Cornelius McCurtain (father)
- Relatives: Jane Austin McCurtain (sister-in-law); Jackson McCurtain (brother); Edmund McCurtain (brother)
- Known for: Vice President of the Sequoyah Convention, last independent Choctaw chief

Greenwood "Green" McCurtain (November 28, 1848 – December 27, 1910) was a Choctaw statesman and law enforcement officer, and the last elected Principal Chief of the Choctaw Nation (1896–1900 and 1902–1906), serving a total of four elected two-year terms. After 1906 and dissolution of tribal governments under the Dawes Act prior to Oklahoma's annexation and achieving statehood, McCurtain was appointed as chief by Theodore Roosevelt. He served in that capacity until his death in 1910, and was the last freely-elected Chief of the Choctaws until 1971.

Green McCurtain also achieved notice for represented his tribe as a delegate at the Sequoyah Constitutional Convention. This was an effort by American Indian nations in Indian Territory to create an Indian-controlled state in what is now Oklahoma. They were not successful in getting Congressional support for this proposal, as Euro-Americans who had established considerable presence in the Oklahoma Territory with Federal backing, lobbied strongly for the two territories to be admitted as a single state.

== Personal life ==
Greenwood "Green" McCurtain was born on November 28, 1848, in Skullyville, Choctaw Nation, Indian Territory, the third son of Cornelius McCurtain, born in Mississippi, and Mayhiya "Amy" Blevins, both Choctaw. He was named after leader Greenwood LeFlore. Blevins's grandmother was Sho-Ma-Ka, a captive from a neighboring tribe who was adopted and assimilated into the Choctaw. McCurtain's paternal ancestry was of Irish origin. His Irish immigrant ancestor was Cornelius McCurtain, nephew of Cornelius Curtain, from County Cork, who settled in Spanish Florida in the 18th century with a land grant from the Spanish crown. He became a trader and married into the Choctaw tribe.

In 1833, McCurtain's parents and older brother Jackson had moved with numerous other Choctaw to Indian Territory as part of Indian Removal and the Choctaw Trail of Tears. His family became prominent as leaders of the tribe. His older brothers were Jackson McCurtain, born in Mississippi (1830-1885); Edmund Aaron McCurtain, (1842-1890); and David Cornelius McCurtain (1846-1874). They also had a younger brother Robert McCurtain (1853-1874), who was fatally shot at age 20 by a cousin.

Green's older brother Jackson McCurtain became a leader and served as president of the Choctaw senate before succeeding Isaac Garvin as president. Jackson served 1880–1884; he was succeeded by his brother Edmund, who served 1884–1886, a total of three two-year terms by the two of them.

== Marriage and family ==
McCurtain was a Baptist, at a time when numerous Choctaw had become Protestants, influenced by missionaries.

He married Martha Ainsworth, a European-American woman, and together they had a son, D.C. McCurtain. He later lived in Spiro, Oklahoma. The senior McCurtain later married his second wife, Kate 'Kittie' Spring. They had a son and four daughters together: Alice, Lena, Bertha and Cora.

== Early political career ==
McCurtain was an imposing man among his people, described as six foot two. He had a variety of positions locally and in the tribe before becoming principal chief after his brothers. In 1872 he served as sheriff of Skullyville County.

By the late nineteenth century, he represented the Tuskahoma, or Progressive party of his tribe, also known as the "Eagles", who began to favor negotiation with the United States over proposals for allotment and statehood of the Choctaw communal lands. Much like Chief Kiliahote, McCurtain was originally opposed to this, but came to believe he needed to negotiate to try to achieve the best outcome for the Choctaw prior to what he saw was an inevitable annexation.

The nation was violently torn by the prospect of losing their sovereign governance and lands, and being annexed into the United States. The day after the 1884 elections, a Nationalist named Charles Wilson was brutally killed. While more than one Progressive was implicated in the assassination, several Choctaw were acquitted and only Jackson Crow, an African American, was convicted and executed for the crime. In the 1890s, Silan Lewis, a committed Nationalist, killed five Progressives in related retaliatory political assassinations. He was convicted and executed by the Choctaw in 1894.

McCurtain continued to gain power in this period. He served as Choctaw National Treasurer for two terms and oversaw the distribution of $2 million in treaty settlements. Twice he served as the Choctaw Delegate to the U.S. federal government in Washington, DC.

He served as a member of his district's board of education within the tribe. In addition, he served as district attorney. In 1896 and 1898, McCurtain was elected as Principal Chief of the Choctaw Nation; he was the third of his brothers to be elected as chief. (His older brothers Jackson McCurtain and Edmund McCurtain had previously been elected as chief, serving a total of three terms.) Term limits prevented him from a third successive term, and he instead supported Gilbert Dukes, a member of his Tushka Homma Party and the former National Auditor of the Choctaw Nation. He supported Dukes' efforts expended toward the building of an Indian Hospital at Talihina.

== U.S. interference in the 1902 election ==
Chief Gilbert Dukes declined to seek reelection in 1902, and McCurtain was eligible to run again for the position of Chief. In the election that year, Thomas Hunter, a friend of the outgoing Chief Dukes, was McCurtain’s primary opponent. In October 1902 before the votes were canvassed, in fear of resurgent violence, the Federal Government sent soldiers to Tushka Homma to keep the peace. The morning on which the votes were supposed to be canvassed, Chief Dukes walked into the Choctaw Capitol with Hunter and turned over everything to him, proclaiming Hunter as his successor. Major Hackett, a U.S. Marshal, who was also a friend of Gilbert Dukes and Tom Hunter, took possession of the Capitol Building and grounds, and recognized Tom Hunter as the rightful Chief on behalf of the United States. Backed by Hackett and his men, Hunter proceeded to organize a council. Alarmed at this coup, McCurtain and his followers sought to contest the election, but were barred from the Capitol by federal troops.

The Indian Agent J. Blair Shoenfelt was present and attempted to settle the difficulty, but it was impossible because the U.S. Marshal (who represented the Justice Department) was in charge. Therefore, Agent Shoenfelt sent a message directly to the War Department in Washington and asked for new troops. The order went to Fort Sill for soldiers to go to Tushka Homma. Saturday about noon, which was the last day provided by the Choctaw Constitution to canvass the votes, over 200 U.S. Soldiers marched on the Capitol, and after the commander consulted for one hour with both the Marshal and the Agent, the army took charge of the building, disarming all occupants, and instructed them to tend to any business necessary. The members of the two factions then entered into fistfights in which the military command took no side, while the votes were still being canvassed. It was dark when the canvassing was completed, and Green McCurtain was declared elected as Principal Chief of the Choctaw Nation.

== Later career ==
"It must be borne constantly in mind that there is such diversity of opinion in Congress on the question of statehood legislation for Indian Territory that it is impossible for the Indians and noncitizens here to unite on any plan acceptable to Congress. However, I express the sentiment of the great majority of the Indians of the Five Tribes when I say that we are in favor of any statehood that Congress may provide, so long as it is statehood for Indian Territory alone, independent of Oklahoma."

— Green McCurtain, 1904

In 1904, another election was held where McCurtain and Thomas Hunter faced off again, and McCurtain was re-elected. This was the last time the Choctaws freely elected their Chief before annexation into the U.S., and they would not hold free elections for chief again until 1971.

Before Oklahoma was admitted as a state, McCurtain joined Cherokee chief William C. Rogers in calling for a constitutional convention for Indian Territory to be admitted as a separate state, called Sequoyah. McCurtain represented the Choctaw Nation as a delegate to the Sequoyah Constitutional Convention in August 1905, and later served as the convention's Vice President. He helped to draft the proposed state's constitution, and this document is thought to have laid the groundwork for the Oklahoma Constitution.

He continued to serve until October 1906, despite the fact the tribal governments and institutions were dissolved by the United States under the Dawes Act in March 1906, paving the way for annexation. Under Theodore Roosevelt, the Bureau of Indian Affairs appointed McCurtain to continue as chief, where he acted under BIA supervision until his death in office in 1910.

Although originally a member of the Democratic Party, which represented a solid block in the states of the former Confederacy, McCurtain came to believe their Congressional delegation was hostile to his people. He shifted his affiliation to the Republican Party, and many of his tribesmen did the same. In those years, the Democrats had established the Solid South, a block they controlled because of having disenfranchised most blacks, Natives and other minorities at the turn of the century, and retaining full control of the region's congressionally apportioned seats, based on the total population (until 2003, the only Natives elected to the U.S. Congress from Oklahoma were all Democrats with the backing of the party - five in total). Even if McCurtain influenced many Choctaws to become Republicans, they remained both racial and political minorities in the new Southern state of Oklahoma, and as such they were cast aside by the ruling White Democratic establishment.

== Death ==
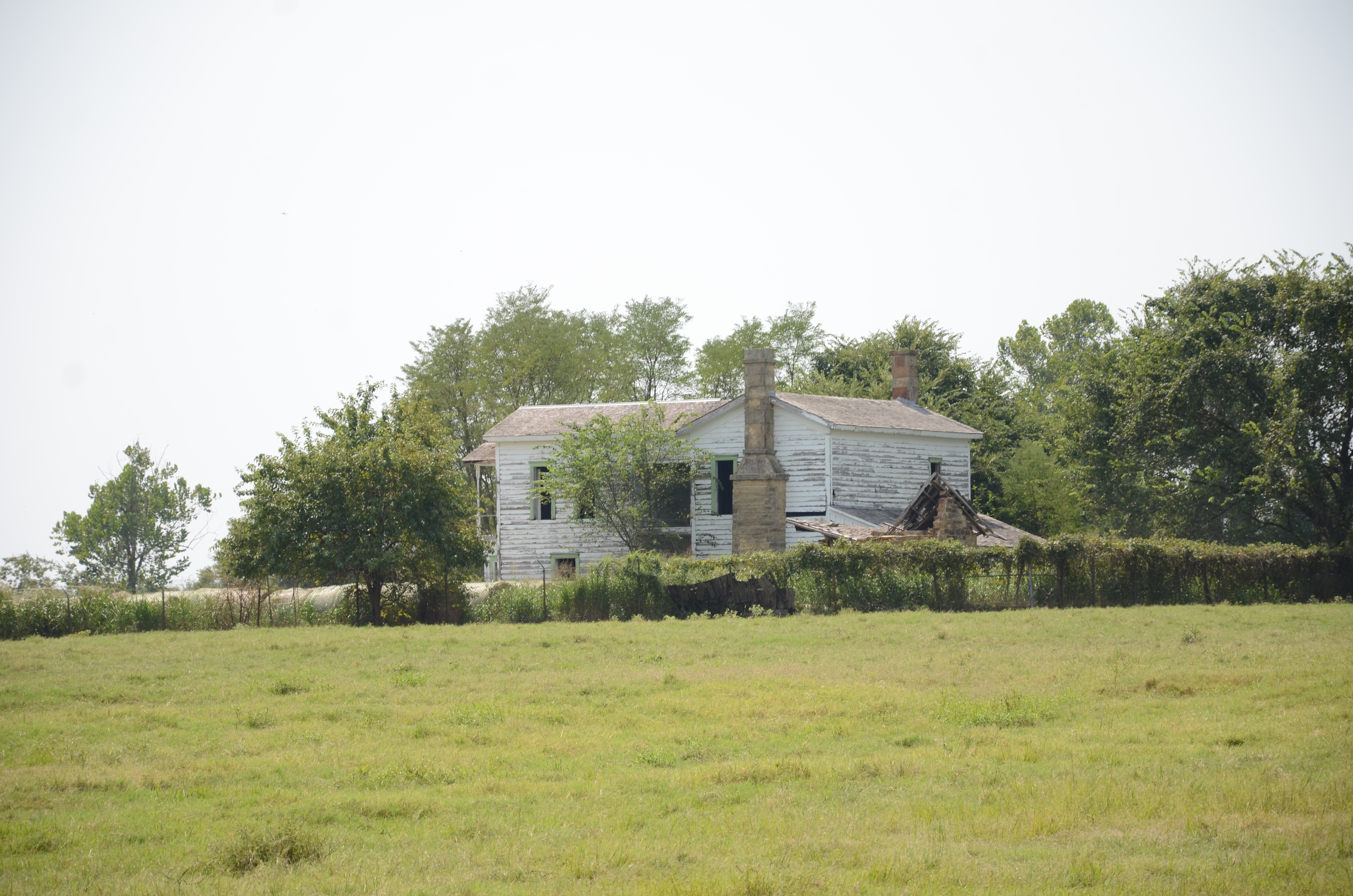
McCurtain’s former home outside the Choctaw village of Kinta, seen in 2015

McCurtain died December 27, 1910, at his home in Kinta, Oklahoma. He was buried in San Bois Cemetery in Kinta, Haskell County, Oklahoma.

His former home, the Green McCurtain House, was listed on the National Register of Historic Places on June 21, 1971. The house was in ruins at the time following a tragic fire, and has since been reconstructed. Built in 1880, it is a two-story, L-shaped residence.

== Legacy and honors ==
- McCurtain County, Oklahoma was named for his family.
