= Tara Astigarraga =

Native American software engineer

Tara Astigarraga is a Native American software engineer. She is a member of the Choctaw Nation of Oklahoma.

== Early life and education ==
Astigarraga was born and raised in Arizona. While attending the University of Arizona, she studied to become a Spanish linguistics and communications major. In her early college days, she aspired to become both a bilingual teacher and a social worker. While at the University of Arizona, she developed a passion for helping others which led to her being an advisory board member with the corporate group titled AISES, which is a non profit organization that is helping to increase the representation in STEM careers within underrepresented groups. Astigarraga also completed her master's degree in Computer Information Systems.

While in college, she enrolled in the University’s cooperative education program through which she was offered an internship with IBM Systems Group. Her internship work at IBM gave her perceptive in STEM and sparked her software engineering journey. She also served as the Vice President of the Tucson Native American Diversity Network and created virtual mentorship connections for IBM Native American employees and Native American students.

== Career ==
In 2008, she received her first patent and today, she owns 80 over patents.

She has been named an IBM Master Inventor for work with 75 patents including network, storage, security, and blockchain. She has also been profiled in a children's book titled Who is a scientist? authored by Laura Gehl.

Tara and her husband Julio have two daughters and live in Raleigh, North Carolina.
