= Edmund McCurtain =

Choctaw chief and Confederate soldier

Principal chief of the Choctaw Nation
- In office 1884–1886
- Preceded by: Jackson McCurtain
- Succeeded by: Thompson McKinney

Member of the Choctaw Senate from the Moshulatubbee District
- In office 1888–1890
- Constituency: Sambai Kaunti

Personal details
- Born: June 4, 1842 Fort Coffee, Choctaw Nation, Indian Territory
- Died: November 11, 1890 (aged 48) Skullyville, Choctaw Nation, Indian Territory
- Citizenship: Choctaw Nation
- Parent: Cornelius McCurtain (father)
- Relatives: Jackson McCurtain (brother); Green McCurtain (brother)

Military service
- Allegiance: Choctaw Nation; Confederate States
- Branch/service: Confederate army
- Years of service: 1861–1865
- Rank: Second Lieutenant
- Unit: Confederate First Regiment of Choctaw and Chickasaw Mounted Rifles
- Battles/wars: American Civil War

Edmund McCurtain was a Choctaw politician who served as the principal chief of the Choctaw Nation from 1884 to 1886.

== Biography ==
Edmund McCurtain was born on June 4, 1842, at Fort Coffee, the son of Cornelius McCurtain. During the American Civil War he served under his brother Jackson McCurtain in the Confederate First Regiment of Choctaw and Chickasaw Mounted Rifles. After the war he moved to Sans Bois in present-day Haskell County. In 1866 he built the Edmund McCurtain House. He became one of the wealthiest ranchers in the Choctaw Nation. From 1884 to 1886 he served as the principal chief of the Choctaw Nation. He died on November 11, 1890, at Skullyville, Indian Territory.
