= Jackson McCurtain =

Choctaw chief and Confederate soldier

- Tʋshka Homma
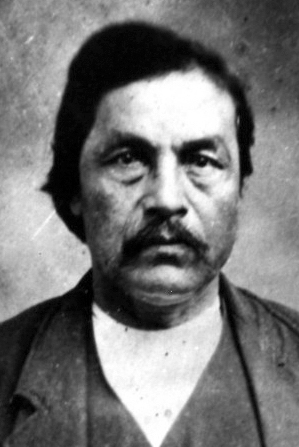

Principal Chief of the Choctaw Nation
- In office 1880–1884
- Preceded by: Isaac Garvin
- Succeeded by: Edmund McCurtain

President of the Choctaw Senate
- In office 1870–1880

Member of the Choctaw Senate from the Moshulatubbee District
- In office 1866–1880
- Constituency: Nvnih Chufvk Kaunti

Member of the Choctaw National Council from the Moshulatubbee District
- In office 1859–1861
- Constituency: Nvnih Chufvk Kaunti

Personal details
- Born: March 4, 1830 Mississippi, U.S.
- Died: November 14, 1885 (aged 55) Tuskahoma, Indian Territory
- Citizenship: Choctaw Nation
- Party: Progressive Party
- Spouse: Jane Austin McCurtain
- Parent: Cornelius McCurtain (father)
- Relatives: Edmund McCurtain (brother); Green McCurtain (brother)

Military service
- Allegiance: Choctaw Nation; Confederate States
- Branch/service: Confederate army
- Years of service: 1861–1865
- Rank: Lieutenant Colonel
- Unit: Confederate First Regiment of Choctaw and Chickasaw Mounted Rifles; First Choctaw Battalion
- Battles/wars: American Civil War

Jackson McCurtain (Choctaw: Tʋshka Homma, lit. 'Red Warrior') (1830-1885) was a Choctaw politician who served as the principal chief of the Choctaw Nation from 1880 until 1884.

== Biography ==
Jackson McCurtain was born in Mississippi on March 4, 1830, to Cornelius McCurtain and Mahayia Nelson. He fought in the American Civil War serving as a captain in the Confederate First Regiment of Choctaw and Chickasaw Mounted Rifles and later as a lieutenant colonel in the First Choctaw Battalion. After the war he was a successful Choctaw farmer and rancher who married Jane Austin McCurtain in 1865. He who served in the Senate of the Choctaw Nation for many years and who served as the president of the senate from 1870 to 1880 when Principal Chief Isaac Garvin died. After Garvin's death, he was appointed principal chief and served in that position until 1884. He died on November 14, 1885, shortly after leaving office. During his tenure he was known as a progressive chief and for building the first permanent capital for the Choctaw Nation. He was succeeded by his brother, Edmund McCurtain.
