= Tarlow Creek =

Stream in Mississippi, United States

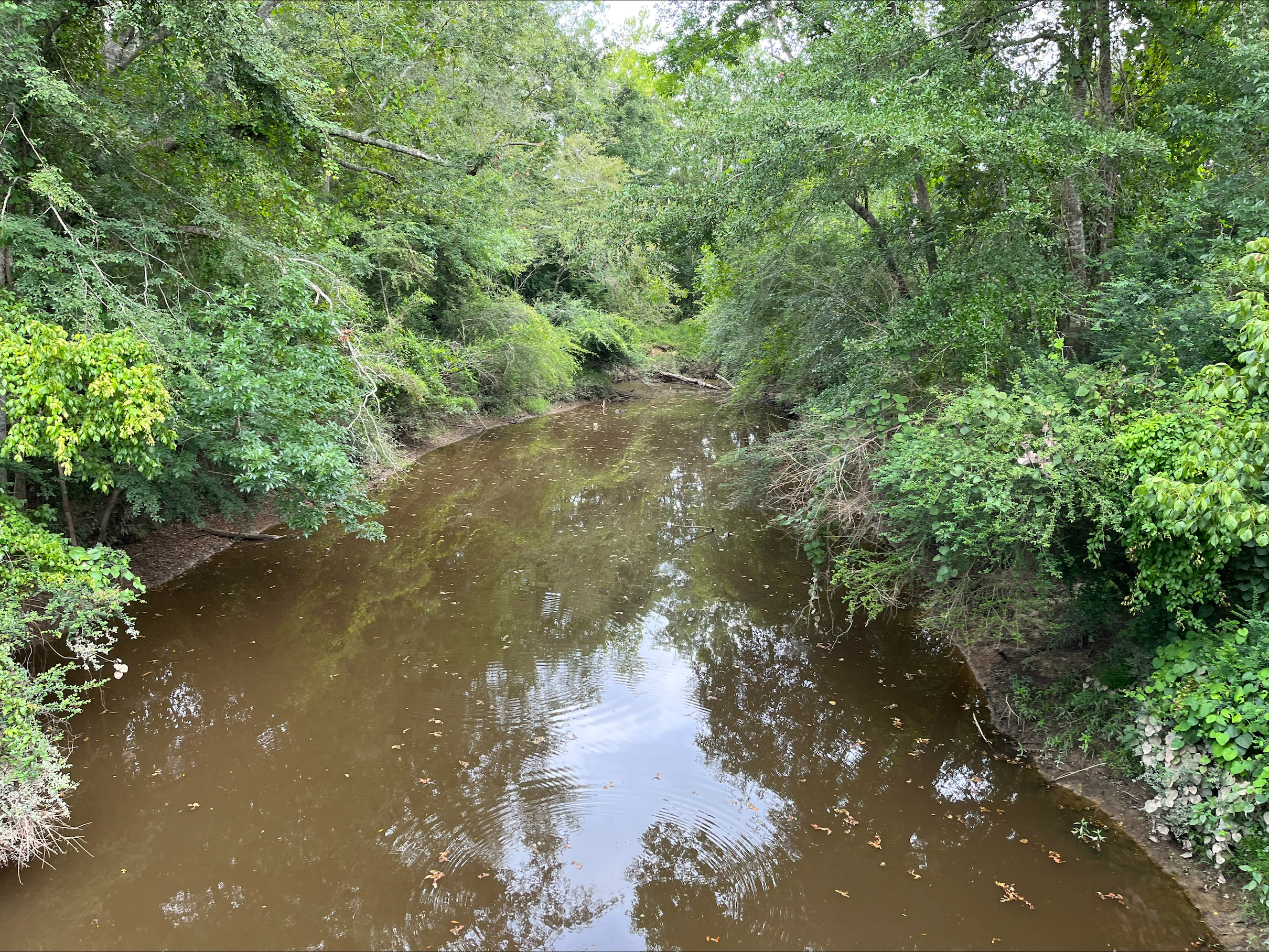
- Tarlow Creek

Location
- Country: United States
- State: Mississippi

Physical characteristics
- Source
  - coordinates: 32.2387576°N 89.2064498°W
- Mouth
  - coordinates: 32.3248663°N 89.1014467°W
- Length: 13.96 mi (22.47 km)
- Basin size: 16.1 sq mi (42 km^{2})

Tarlow Creek is a stream in the U.S. state of Mississippi. It is a tributary of Potterchitto Creek.

Tarlow is a name derived from the Choctaw language purported to mean "palmetto". Variant names are "Parlow Creek" and "Sunflower Creek".
