= Stuckey's Bridge =

- U.S. National Register of Historic Places
- Mississippi Landmark
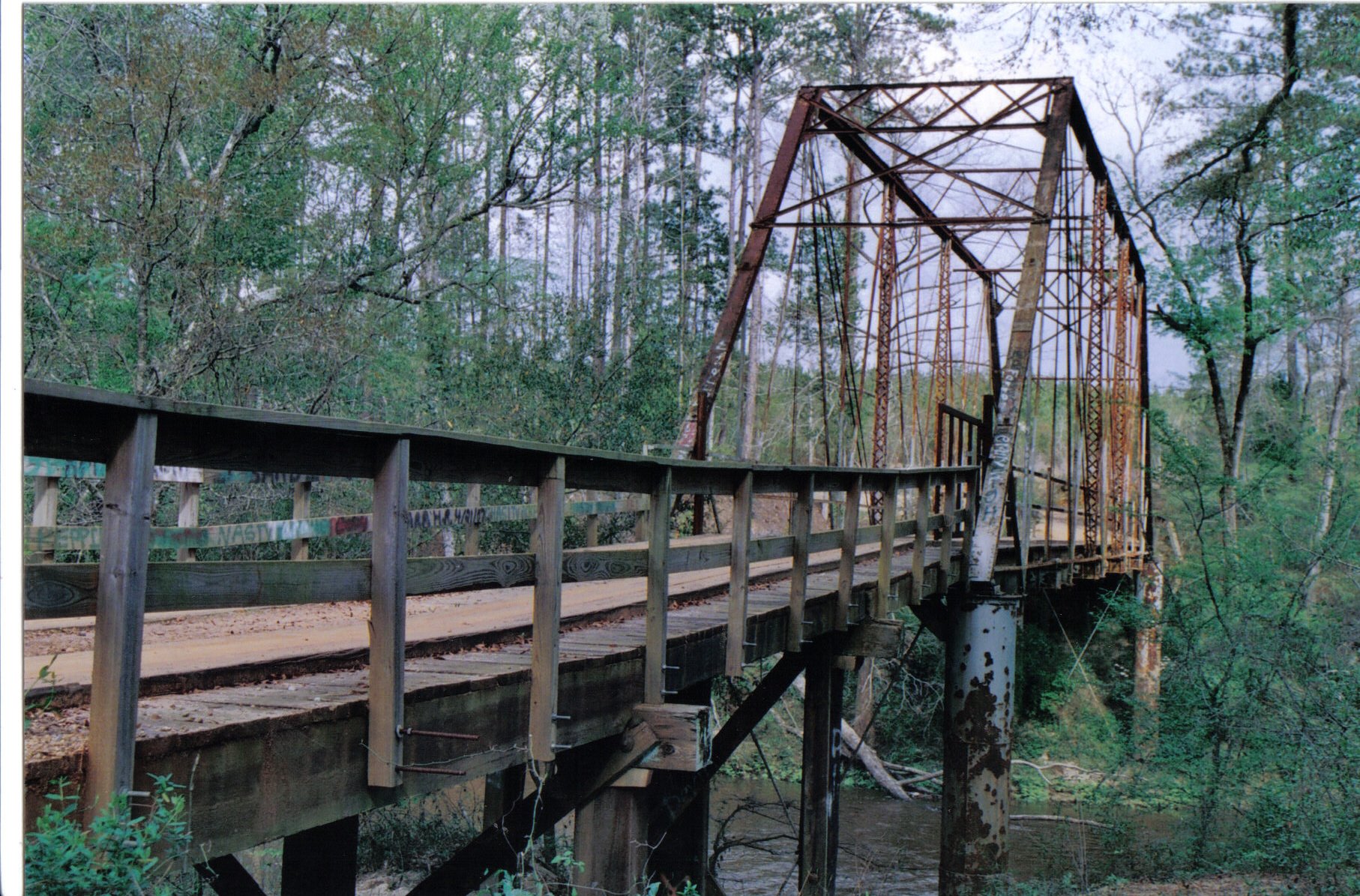
- Looking across the bridge

- Location within Mississippi Location within the United States
- Nearest city: Meridian, Mississippi
- Coordinates: 32°15′20″N 88°51′19″W
- Built: 1901
- Architect: Virginia Bridge and Iron Co.
- Architectural style: Stearns through truss
- MPS: Historic Bridges of Mississippi TR
- NRHP reference No.: 88002415
- USMS No.: 075-MER-5804-NR-ML

Significant dates
- Added to NRHP: November 16, 1988
- Designated USMS: August 4, 1984

Stuckey's Bridge is a bridge spanning the Chunky River just outside Meridian, Mississippi. The bridge was listed as a Mississippi Landmark on August 4, 1984, and added to the National Register of Historic Places on November 16, 1988.

== History ==
The bridge was originally built as the main route across the Chunky River southwest of Meridian. Documents in the Lauderdale County Archives reveal the contract to construct a bridge in this location was written in 1847, and estimates place the bridge's construction date around 1850. A new bridge replaced the old one in 1901, built by the Virginia Bridge and Iron Company.

== Legends ==
According to legend, a member of the Dalton Gang named "Stuckey" owned a nearby inn where he would rob and murder his guests and bury his victims’ bodies on the riverbank. The legend says that after murdering twenty people, Stuckey was finally caught and hanged from the newly constructed bridge located on the site of his murders. Rumours of Stuckey haunting the bridge arose as well as claimed sightings of an old man carrying a lantern along the river's edge, loud splashes that supposedly represent Stuckey's body hitting the water after his noose was cut, and visions of his lifeless corpse hanging from the bridge.

== In the media ==
=== Television ===
Stuckey's Bridge was one of the featured haunted locations on the paranormal TV series, Most Terrifying Places in America which aired on the Travel Channel in 2018 in a special episode titled "Haunted Road Trips". On the segment, the bridge was referred to as 'Old Man Stuckey's Bridge'.
