= Bogue Falema Creek =

Stream in Mississippi, United States

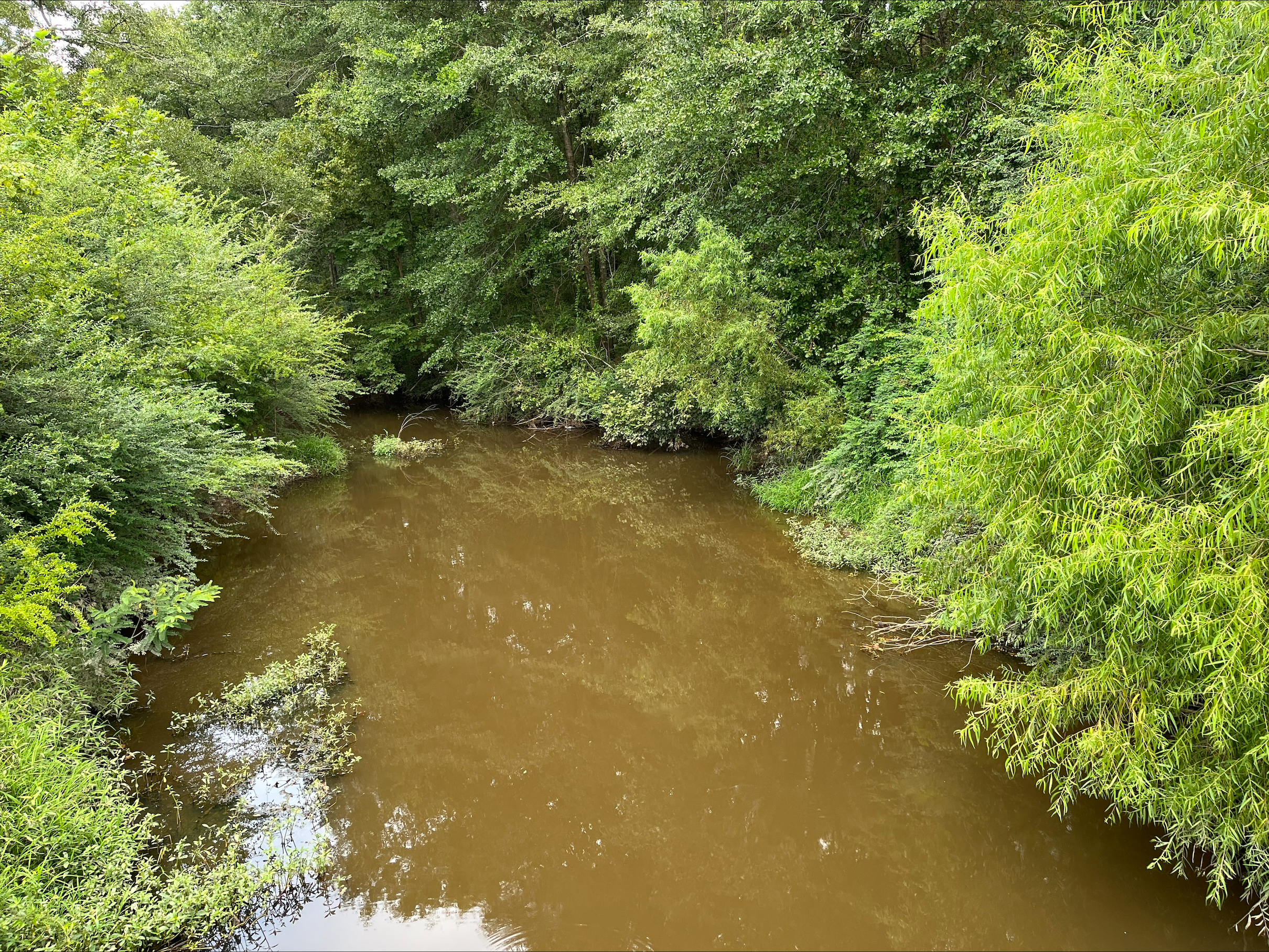
- Bogue Falema Creek

Location
- Country: United States
- State: Mississippi

Physical characteristics
- Source
  - coordinates: 32.2584792°N 89.1820046°W
- Mouth
  - coordinates: 32.3129221°N 89.0486674°W
- Length: 14.3 mi (23.0 km)

Bogue Falema Creek is a stream in the U.S. state of Mississippi. It is a tributary to Potterchitto Creek.

Bogue Falema is a name derived from the Choctaw language perhaps meaning "branch or prong of a stream". Variant names are "Bogue", "Boguefelema Creek", "Felammie Creek", and "Philemma Creek".
