= Potterchitto Creek =

Stream in Mississippi, United States

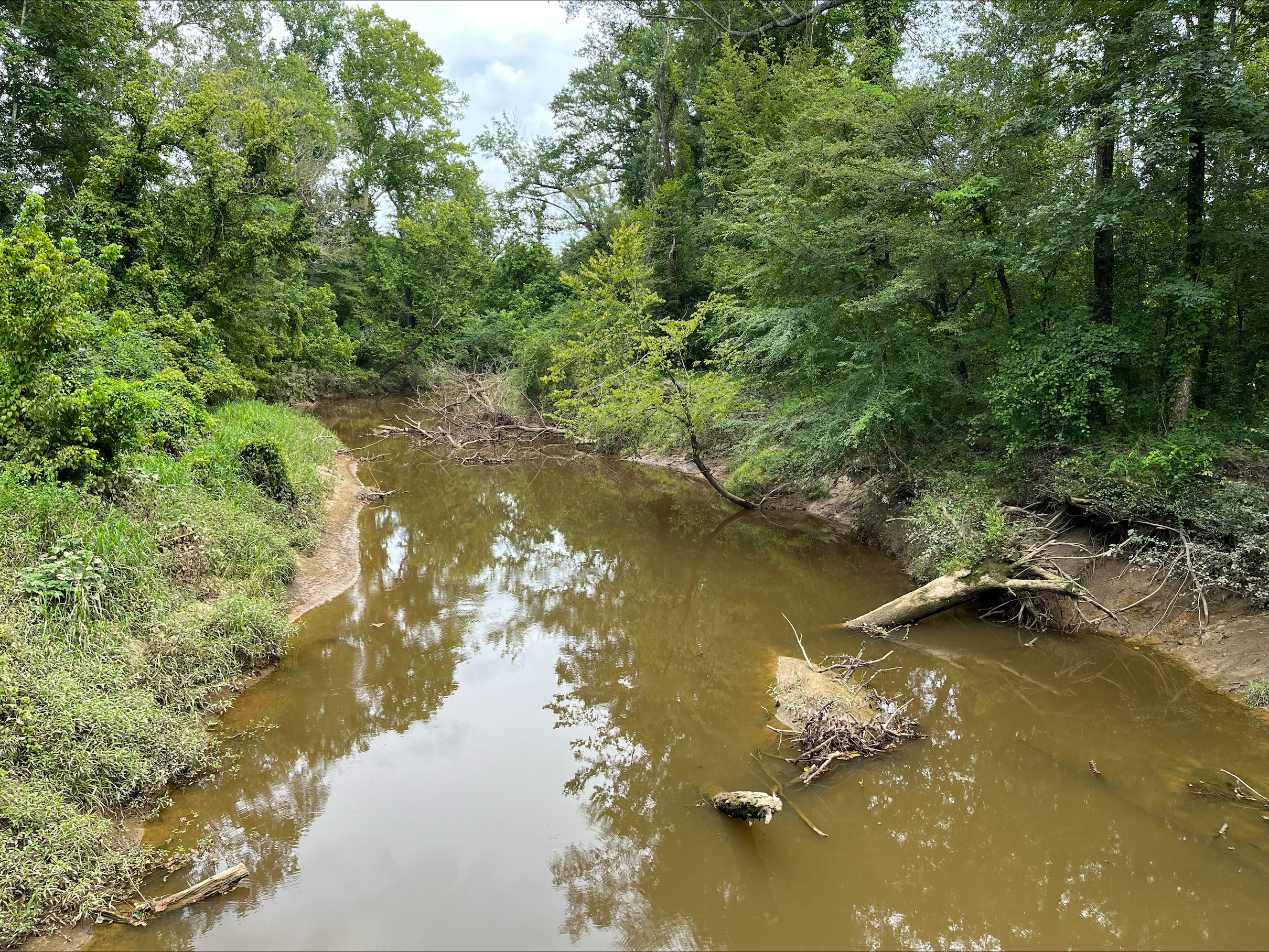
- Potterchitto Creek

Location
- Country: United States
- State: Mississippi

Physical characteristics
- Source
  - coordinates: 32.3334774°N 89.3334774°W
- Mouth
  - coordinates: 32.3126443°N 88.9672761°W
- Length: 29.03 mi (46.72 km)

Potterchitto Creek is a stream in the U.S. state of Mississippi. It is a tributary to the Chunky River. Tributaries include Tarlow Creek and Bogue Falema Creek.

Potterchitto is a name derived from the Choctaw language purported to mean either (sources vary) "broad" or "big furrow/big valley". Variant names are "Poto Chitto Creek", "Pottok Chetto Creek", and "Pottoxchitto Creek".

The Potterchitto member, part of the Wautubbee Formation, is named for Potterchitto Creek.
