= US 190 Bridge at the Colorado River =

- U.S. National Register of Historic Places
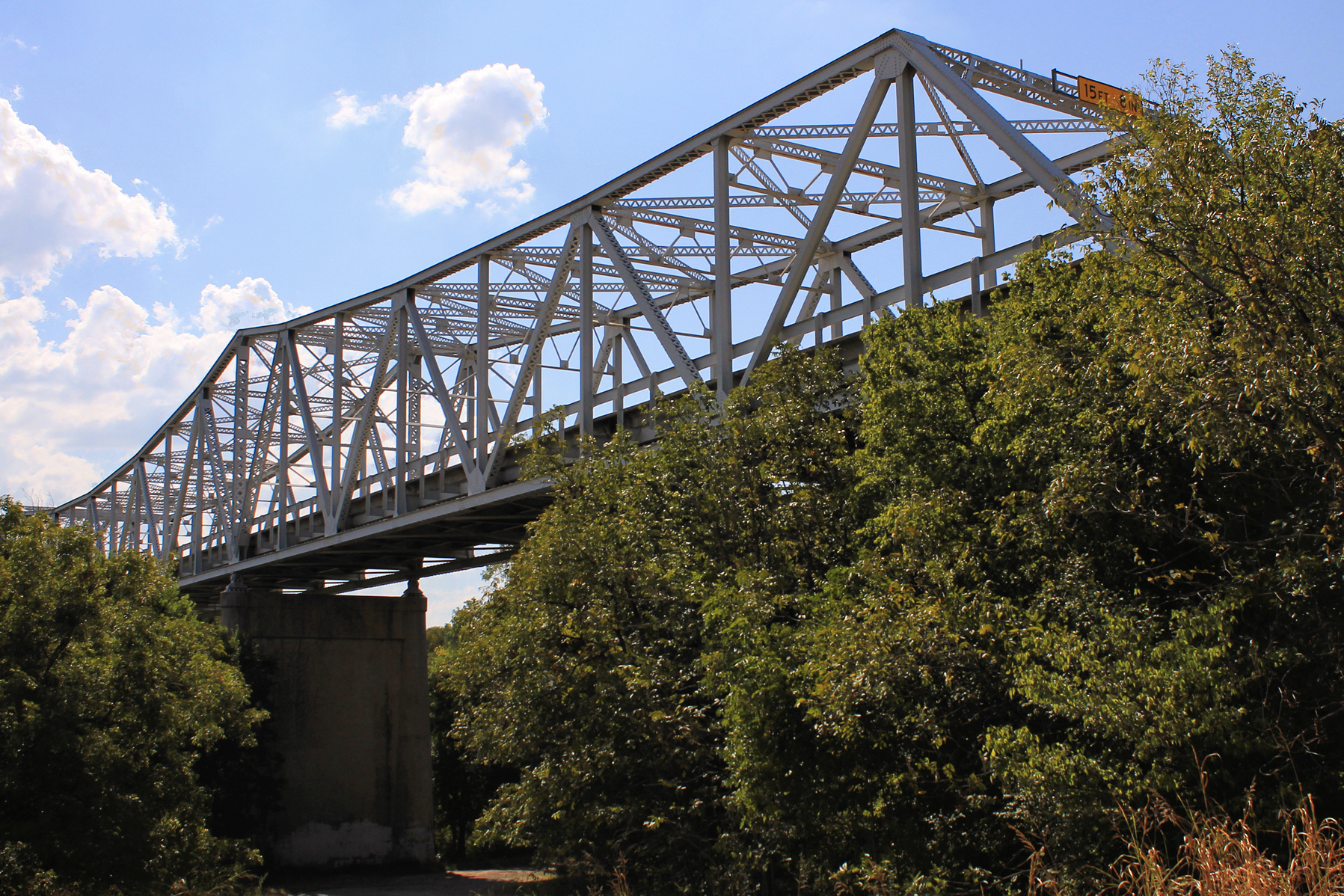

- Location within Texas
- Nearest city: Lometa, Texas
- Coordinates: 31°13′04″N 98°33′50″W
- Area: less than one acre
- Built: 1939
- Built by: Cage Brothers & L.A. Turner; Virginia Bridge Company, et al.
- Architectural style: continuous through truss
- MPS: Historic Bridges of Texas MPS
- NRHP reference No.: 96001125
- Added to NRHP: October 10, 1996

The US 190 Bridge at the Colorado River, near Lometa, Texas, brings U.S. Route 190 across the Colorado River between Lampasas County, Texas and San Saba County, Texas. It was built in 1939-40 and was listed on the National Register of Historic Places in 1996.

It is a continuous through truss bridge, built to replace a Pennsylvania truss bridge called the Red Bluff Bridge which was damaged by a flood in July 1938.

It was designed by the Texas Highway Department, fabricated by the Virginia Bridge Company, and built by Cage Brothers & L.A. Turner.
