= William Steele (Confederate general) =

American military officer and businessman (1819–1885)

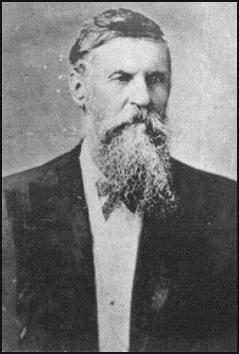

16th Adjutant General of Texas
- In office January 20, 1874 – January 25, 1879
- Governor: Richard Coke; Richard Hubbard
- Preceded by: Frank Britton
- Succeeded by: John Jones

Personal details
- Born: May 1, 1819 Albany, New York, U.S.
- Died: January 12, 1885 (aged 65) San Antonio, Texas, U.S.
- Resting place: Oakwood Cemetery, Austin, Texas

Military service
- Allegiance: United States; Confederate States
- Branch: United States Army; Confederate States Army
- Years of service: 1840–1861 (U.S.); 1861–1865 (C.S.)
- Rank: Captain (USA); Brigadier General (CSA)
- Battles/wars: See list: Second Seminole War; Mexican–American War; Battle of Palo Alto; Battle of Monterrey; Siege of Veracruz; Battle of Cerro Gordo; Battle of Contreras; Battle of Churubusco; Battle of Molino del Rey; American Indian Wars; American Civil War; New Mexico campaign; Battle of Perryville; Red River campaign

William Steele (May 1, 1819 – January 12, 1885) was a career military officer and businessman who served as the 16th adjutant general of Texas from 1874 until 1879. He previously served as a senior officer of the Confederate States Army who commanded cavalry in the Trans-Mississippi Theater of the American Civil War.

== Early life and military career ==
Steele was born in Albany, New York; his mother was from Florida and his father originally from New England. He attended the United States Military Academy at West Point in 1836, graduating four years later standing 31st out of 42 cadets. He was appointed a brevet second lieutenant in the 2nd U.S. Dragoons on July 1, 1840.

Steele served at the Cavalry School for Practice at the Carlisle Barracks in Pennsylvania in 1840 and 1841, during which he was promoted to second lieutenant on February 2, 1841. He participated during the Seminole Wars in Florida in 1841 and 1842, engaged there in two skirmishes. Steele and the 2nd Dragoons were on frontier duty at Fort Jesup in Louisiana from 1842 to 1844, and then in garrison at Jefferson Barracks in Missouri in 1844 and 1845.

The 2nd Dragoons were part of the Military Occupation of Texas in 1845 and 1846, just prior to the start of the Mexican–American War. Steele fought at the Battle of Palo Alto on May 8, 1846, after which he was promoted to the rank of first lieutenant in the 2d Dragoons on May 9. He then saw action at the Battle of Monterrey that September, the Siege of Vera Cruz in March 1847, and the Battle of Cerro Gordo in April. Steele then fought in the Battle of Contreras and the Battle of Churubusco on August 20, and the Battle of Molino del Rey that September. Steele was appointed to the rank of brevet captain for his performance at Contreras and Churubusco as of August 20, 1847.

After the war with Mexico ended, Steele was the acting asst. adjutant general of the cavalry brigade in 1847 and 1848. He was also the adjutant of the 2d Dragoons from December 20, 1847, to April 10, 1849, during which the 2nd was in garrison duty at East Pascagoula, Mississippi in 1848. Steele then served on recruiting service in 1848 and 1849, and on frontier duty with the 2nd at several locations in Texas. Included in these assignments were being stationed at Fredericksburg in 1849 and 1850, at Fort Martin Scott, in Austin in 1850, and at Fort Lincoln in 1850 and 1851. Steele and the 2nd Dragoons returned to Fort Martin Scott and later back at Fort Lincoln in 1851, and Steele served as Quartermaster in Austin in 1851 and 1852, during which he was promoted to captain as of November 10, 1851. Due to his multiple postings in Texas, he married a woman from there in 1850.

Steele and the 2nd Dragoons were stationed at Fort Conrad in the New Mexico Territory from 1852 to 1853, and was on scouting duty in 1853, during which Steele was engaged against Apache in a skirmish near Fort Conrad on July 28, 1853. He then served at Fort Craig in the New Mexico Territory in 1854 and at Fort Leavenworth in Kansas from 1854 to 1855. Steele participated in the expedition against the Sioux in 1855, during which he fought near Blue Water on September 3, 1855. He returned to Fort Leavenworth in 1855 and 1856, and then was at Fort Randall in the Dakota Territory from 1856 to 1857. Another stint at Fort Leavenworth followed in 1857 and 1858, and then in garrison at St. Louis, Missouri, in 1858. Steele was on sick leave from 1858 to 1859, and on frontier duty at Fort Kearny in the Nebraska Territory from 1859 into 1860. Steele was part of the expedition against the Kiowa and Comanche in 1860, then stationed once at Fort Scott in Kansas from 1860 to early 1861.

== American Civil War ==
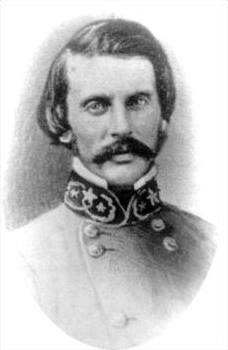
Steele in uniform, c. 1862

On May 30, 1861, Steele resigned his Regular Army commission and moved to Texas. Choosing to follow the Confederate cause and his adopted home state, he entered the Confederate States Army as a colonel in the 7th Texas Cavalry on October 29. His first assignment was heading the Confederate forces in Mesilla during the New Mexico Campaign.

Steele was promoted to brigadier general on September 12, 1862, and then the following year was sent to the Western Theater. He commanded a district of the Trans-Mississippi Department from January 8 to December 11, 1863. He also commanded the rear guard of the Confederate force at the Perryville in the Indian Territory, where the Confederates were defeated in August, 1863. He commanded the department's Eastern Sub-district of the District of Texas, New Mexico, and Arizona beginning on March 18, 1864, participating in the Red River Campaign that spring under General Richard Taylor. He then briefly led a division of cavalry until May 26, 1865, the day Gen. Smith surrendered the department. Steele was paroled on August 4 from San Antonio, Texas.

After the war, Steele returned to Texas and became a commission merchant of cotton from 1866 to 1873. He moved to Austin in 1873 and was then Adjutant General of Texas until his death in early 1885. He died in San Antonio, Texas, at the age of 65, and is buried at Oakwood Cemetery in Austin.

== Honors ==
- Steele was inducted to the Texas Hall of Honor in 1982.

== See also ==
- Confederate States Army generals

== Footnotes ==
Military offices
Preceded by Frank Britton	Adjutant General of Texas; 1874–1879	Succeeded by John Jones
