= Virginia Bridge and Iron Company =

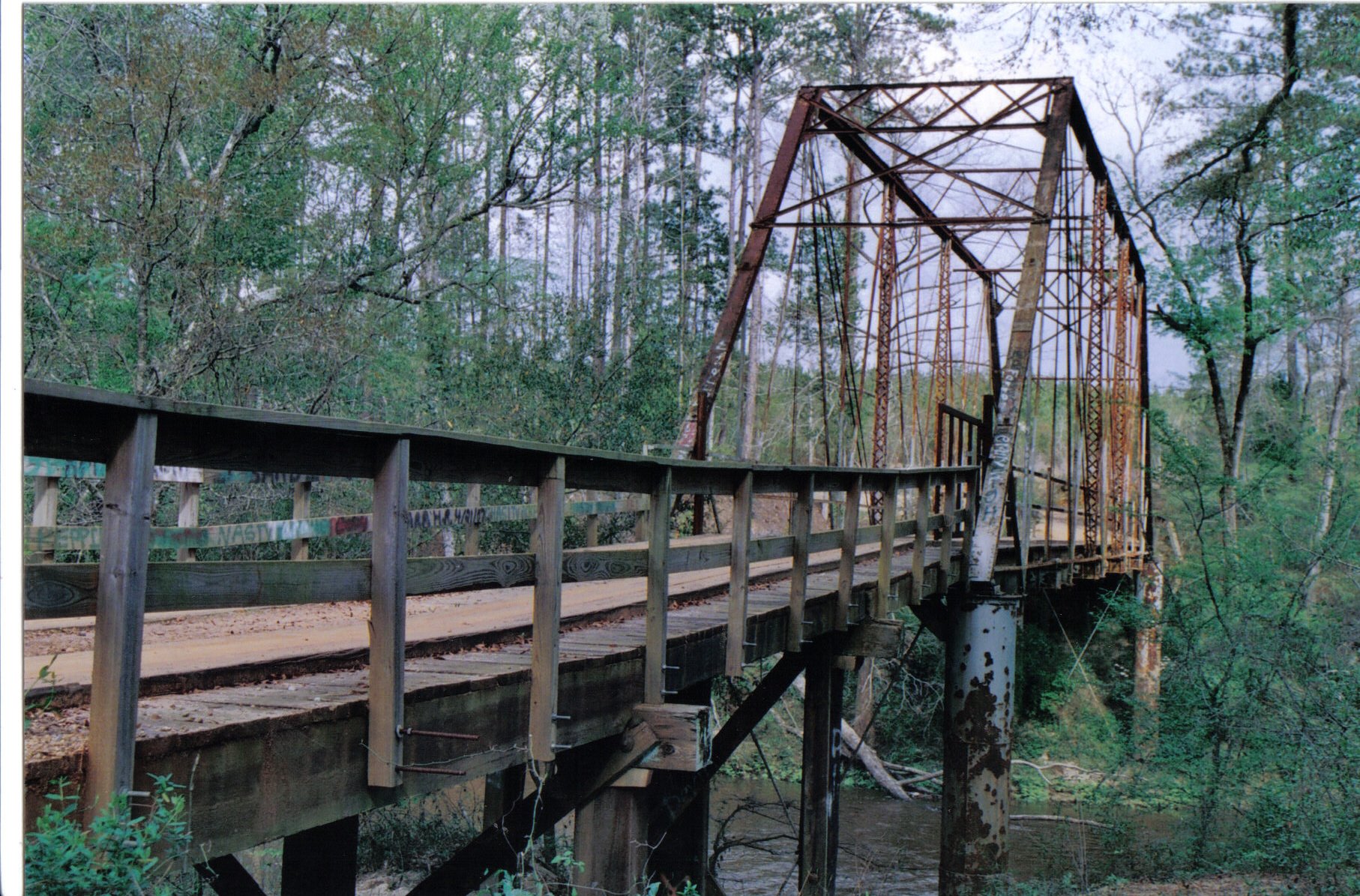
Stuckey's Bridge

The Virginia Bridge & Iron Co., also known as Virginia Bridge Company, was a bridge company based in Roanoke, Virginia.

Several of its works are listed on the U.S. National Register of Historic Places.

Works include (with variations in attribution):

- AR 289 Bridge Over English Creek, AR289 over English Creek, Mammoth Spring, Arkansas (Virginia Bridge & Iron Co.), NRHP-listed
- Clarkton Bridge, VA 620 over the Staunton R, Nathalie, Virginia (Virginia Bridge & Iron Co.), NRHP-listed
- Fairchild's Creek Bridge, Cty Rd. 555, Natchez, Mississippi (Virginia Bridge & Iron Co.), NRHP-listed
- High Bridge, Appomattox River, Farmville, Virginia (Virginia Bridge & Iron Co.), NRHP-listed
- Short Mountain Creek Bridge, Cty. Rd. 64, Paris, Arkansas (Virginia Bridge & Iron Co. of Tenn.), NRHP-listed
- State Highway 16 Bridge at the Brazos River, TX 6, 6 mi. S of jct. with US 82, Benjamin, Texas (Virginia Bridge Company, et al.), NRHP-listed
- State Highway 23 Bridge at the Clear Fork of the Brazos River, US 283, 2.3 mi. S of Throckmorton Cnty. Line, Albany, Texas (Virginia Bridge & Iron Company), NRHP-listed
- State Highway 3 Bridge at the Trinity River, US 90, 1.3 mi. W of jct. with FM 2684, Liberty, Texas (Virginia Bridge & Iron Co., et al.), NRHP-listed
- State Highway 3-A Bridge at Plum Creek, US 90—US 183, .5 mi. W of jct. with I-10, Luling, Texas (Virginia Bridge & Iron Company), NRHP-listed
- Stuckey's Bridge, spans Chunky River on CR, Meridian, Mississippi (Virginia Bridge and Iron Co.), NRHP-listed
- US 190 Bridge at the Colorado River, US 190 at the Lampassand San Saba Cnty. line, Lometa, Texas (Virginia Bridge Company, et al.), NRHP-listed
- US 190 Bridge at the Neches River, US 190 at the Jasper and Tyler Cnty. line, Jasper, Texas (Virginia Bridge Company), NRHP-listed
