= Jack Amos =

American Indian and Confederate soldier (c. 1828–1906)

Interpreter/Private Jack Amos (Eahantatubbee)
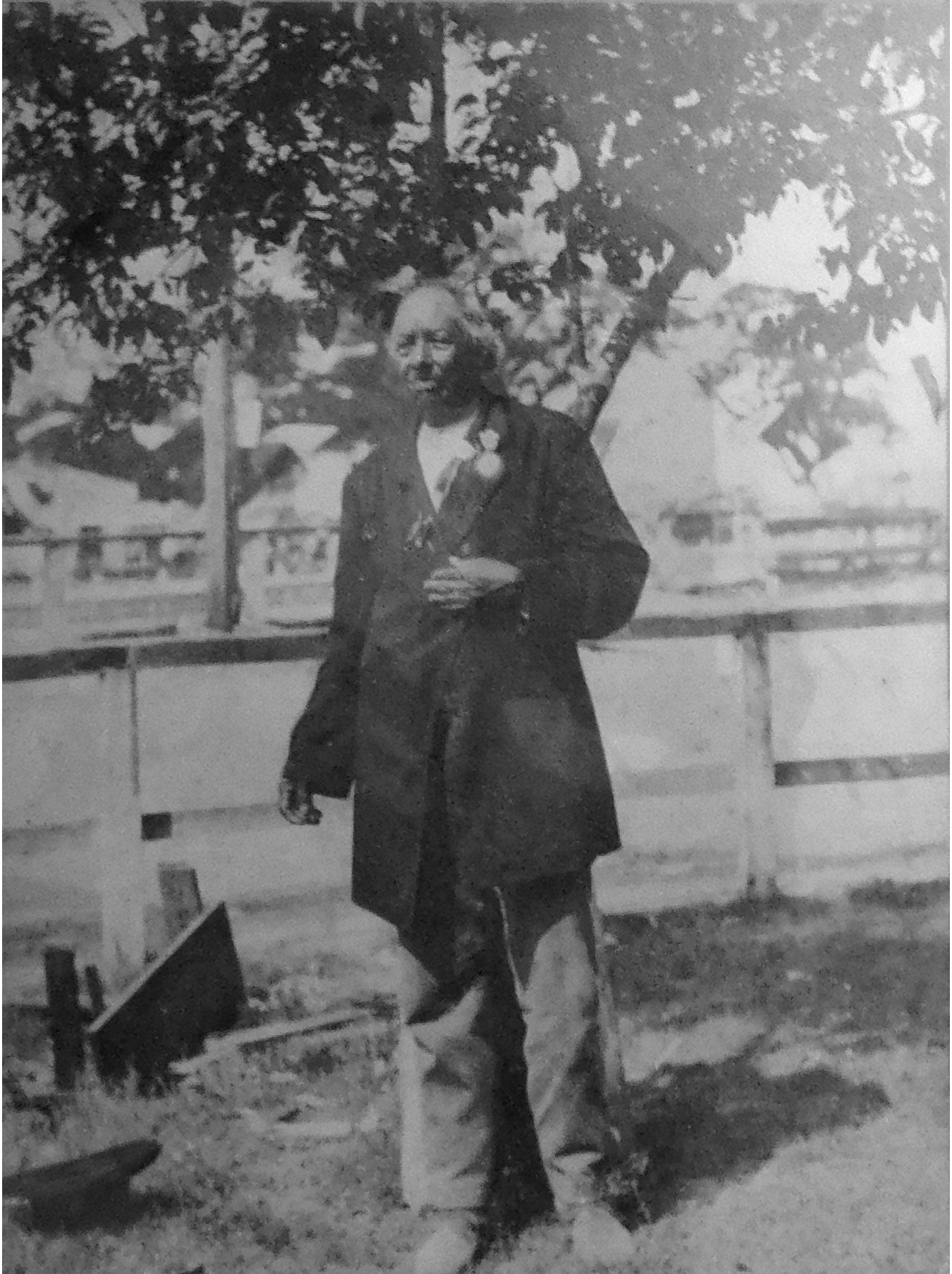
- Jack Amos' Indian name was Eahantatubbee ("He Who Goes Out And Kills")
- Born: Unknown c. 1828; Lost Horse Creek in present-day Lauderdale County, Mississippi
- Died: 1906; Newton County, Mississippi
- Burial place: Unknown
- Military career
- Allegiance: Confederate States; Mississippi
- Branch: Confederate Army
- Service years: 1861–1865 (CSA)
- Rank: Private
- Units: 1st Choctaw Battalion and Spann's Independent Scouts

Jack Amos (c. 1828 - March 1906) was an American Indian and Confederate soldier. His American Indian name was Eahantatubbee ("He Who Goes Out And Kills"). During the American Civil War, Amos served as an interpreter in John W. Pierce's 1st Choctaw Battalion and in Samuel G. Spann's Independent Scouts. In his later years, Amos filed a federal suit which rendered a U.S. Supreme Court decision years after his death.

== Background ==
Amos was born in the Choctaw Nation before the nation removed west of the Mississippi River. His birthplace is near present-day Marion, Mississippi. Amos' parents were Apatomby and Nahhatema. His family moved to the Indian village called Chunky Chitto when he was an infant. He is listed as "Mississippi Choctaw Identified" with a "Full" blood quantum on the Dawes Rolls.

Amos likely attended a missionary school where he gained some mastery of the English language. He was known to be an English to Indian language interpreter.

In Alfred J. Brown's History of Newton County from 1834 to 1894, Brown described Amos as being about 60 years old, having a wife, and in poor health.

Jack has seen the Choctaw Indian in all his wild, untutored state. He grew up as a devotee to all their wild ideas and shrank from all civilization. He engaged in all their time-honored customs, games and dances, believed in all their superstitions and participated in everything the Indian called pleasure and dissipation. In his more than mature manhood he became a convert to the Christian religion and a preacher of righteousness to his fallen race. He was the first preacher among them, and no doubt he has done good and is trying to live a Christian life and persuade others to do so. Yet his speech is slow, his frame is bowing, his noble manhood is gone and he now looks forward to the reward of hereafter. He is reverenced and respected by his people and will be missed when he is gone.

— A. J. Brown, History of Newton County from 1834 to 1894, 1894

== American Civil War ==
Amos served in Pierce's 1st Choctaw Battalion and later Spann's Independent Scouts. He was one of the soldiers who helped with rescue efforts during the Chunky Creek Train Wreck. Confederate Veteran Magazine published an article about the wreck. In the article, Amos was described as a rescuer:

The cry reached the camp. "Fly to the rescue!" was the command, and in less time than I can tell the story every Indian was at the scene. It was there that Jack Amos again displayed his courage and devotion to the Confederate soldiers. I must not omit to say, however, that with a like valor and zeal Elder [Jackson], another full-blood Indian soldier, proved equal to the emergency. Jack Amos and Elder [Jackson] both reside now in Newton County.

Amos reported in his pension that he first enrolled in April 1861. By 1863, he was acting as an interpreter for Major John W. Pierce and for Major Samuel G. Spann. Amos was likely with the 1st Choctaw Battalion at the Battle of Ponchatoula. Amos surrendered at Meridian, Mississippi in 1865.

== Final years ==
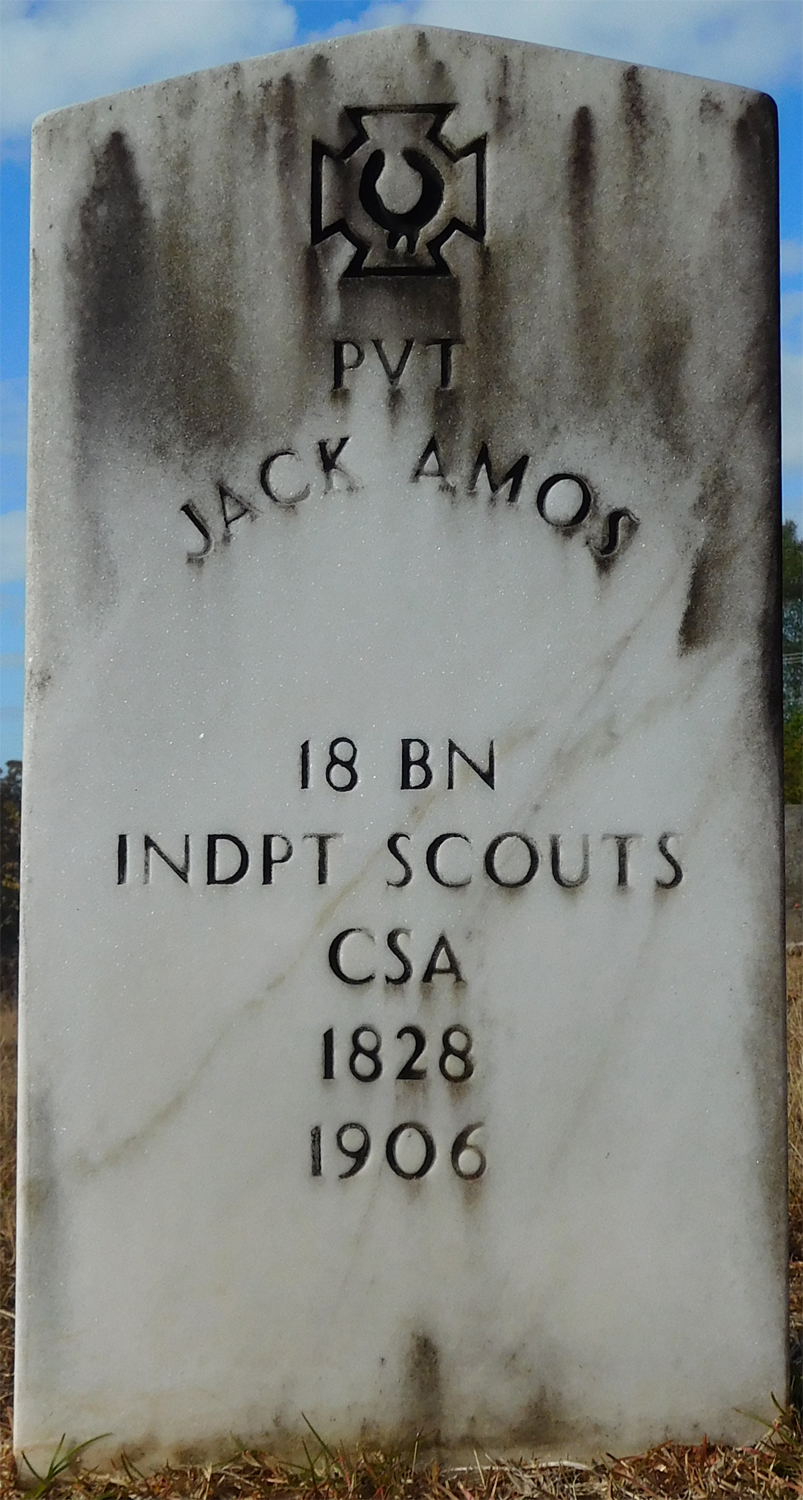
Amos' memorial which was dedicated in 2004.

Amos lived the remainder of his life in Newton County, Mississippi. Amos did not own a home, so he boarded with several Newton County families during his lifetime. According to census and pension data, Amos resided with Thomas J. Reynolds and Evan S. Gilbert.

In 1901, Amos became a member of U.C.V. Camp Dabney H. Maury, No. 1312 which was based in Newton, Mississippi. He attended the 1903 reunion held at New Orleans. A Louisiana journalist wrote an article about him.

FAMOUS INDIAN SCOUT ... Jack Amos of the Choctaw Tribe is Here. One of the Heroic Red Men of the Stormy Period. First With Pearce, and Later With Spann's Battalion. Mississippi Is Planning to Honor the Indian ... He is of the Choctaw tribe, and belonged to a heroic band of red men who gave splendid aid to the Confederacy, and who suffered much as a result of their loyalty to the Southern cause. Amos is now a citizen of Mississippi, and has resided in that State since the war. He is an attractive figure among the reunion visitors, and, while well advanced in years, is entering into the spirit of the occasion with a fine enthusiasm. He is a full-blooded Choctaw Indian, and is a native of Mississippi. Amos is now seventy-three years old. He talks well of himself and of the part he and other Indians played in the war.

— The Times-Democrat, Friday, May 22, 1903

Jack Amos died in March 1906.

== Amos' Legacy ==
The Treaty of Dancing Rabbit Creek was agreed to and signed by leaders of the Choctaws in September 1830. Article 14 allowed any member of the tribe to remain in Mississippi, become a citizen of the United States, and given 640 acres of land. Federal authorities failed to implement article 14 properly leaving tribal members landless. For decades after 1830, petitions were created to address article 14 concerns.

=== Dawes Commission ===
The Dawes Commission was designed to transfer tribe-controlled lands in Indian Territory and to privatize those lands for the benefit of tribal members. The Mississippi Choctaws were originally ignored in these transactions, but they soon were included in the proceedings. The Dawes Commission saw 25,000 applications for enrollment as Mississippi Choctaws. A little over 2,500 were identified as Mississippi Choctaws.

=== Appeals and lawsuits ===
Jack Amos led a class action lawsuit and petitioned for lands in Mississippi rather than lands in Indian Territory.

Amos and several Mississippi Choctaws filed a lawsuit called Jack Amos et al vs. The Choctaw Nation, U. S. Court of Central District of Indian Territory, No 158.

=== Supreme Court's Decision ===
WINTON v. AMOS, 255 U.S. 373, was argued in January 1919, and re-argued April 1920. A decision was reached on March 7, 1921. Justice Mahlon R. Pitney delivered the opinion of the court.
