= Okahatta Creek =

Stream in Mississippi, United States

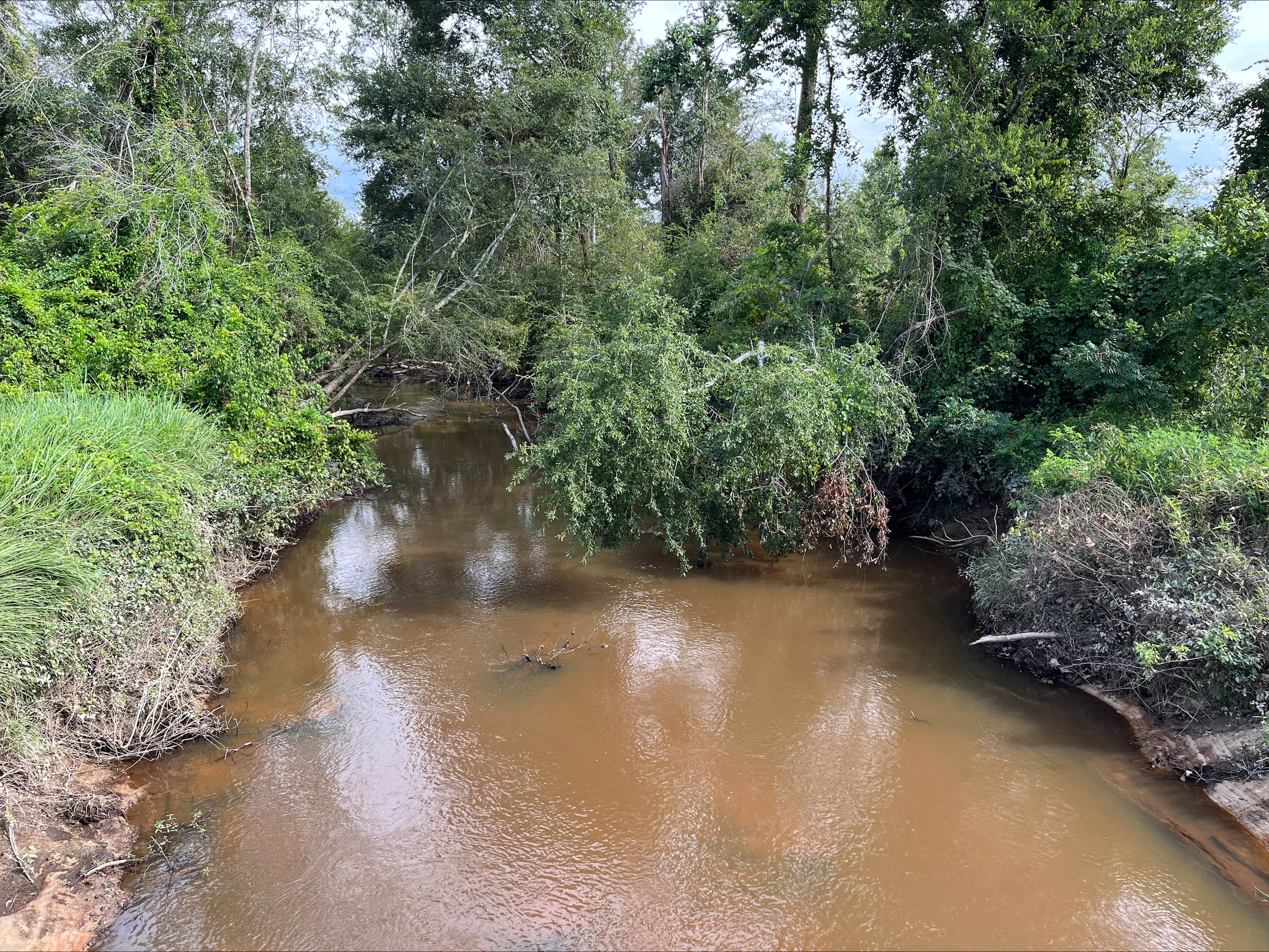
- Okahatta Creek

Location
- Country: United States
- State: Mississippi

Physical characteristics
- Source
  - coordinates: 32.5106952°N 89.1478369°W
- Mouth
  - coordinates: 32.322644°N 88.9769986°W
- Length: 20.39 mi (32.81 km)

Okahatta Creek is a stream in the U.S. state of Mississippi. It is a tributary to Chunky River.

Okahatta Creek is a name derived from the Choctaw language purported to mean either "white water" or "large pond". Variant names are "Oakahatta Creek", "Okakatta Creek", and "Oon Bogue Creek".
