= Battle of Perryville (Indian Territory) =

Battle of the American Civil War

Coordinates: 34.87°N 95.81°W

- Part of the ((American Civil War))
Date	August 23, 1863
Location	Perryville, Choctaw Nation, Indian Territory
Result	Union victory

Belligerents
United States (Union)	(Confederate States of America) CSA (Confederacy)

Commanders and leaders
James G. Blunt	William Steele

Strength
4,500	

Casualties and losses
0	49

The Battle of Perryville took place during the American Civil War on August 23, 1863, in what is now Pittsburg County, Oklahoma.

== Background ==
Perryville was an important town and county seat of Tobucksy County, Choctaw Nation, in the Indian Territory, about halfway between Skullyville and Boggy Depot. (Note: The site is now in Pittsburg County, Oklahoma.) during the mid 19th Century. It was established as a trading post by James Perry, member of a Choctaw family, about 1838, and was located at the crossing of the Texas Road and the California Road. The site is about 3 miles (4.8 km) south of McAlester, Oklahoma on U. S. Highway 69. A post office was established there on February 24, 1841. It was notable as the site of the Colbert Institute, the Methodist School for Chickasaws, and the Battle of Perryville. Perryville was a stage stop from about 1852 until the Missouri, Kansas and Texas Railway (Katy) built a line through the area in 1872. The community was burned after the battle and no structures survived. The retreating Confederate Army soldiers also dumped a quantity of salt into the community well to assure that the advancing Union forces could not use the site.

== Skirmish ==
After winning the encounter at Honey Springs, Major General James G. Blunt learned from scouting reports that Colonel Cooper and his Confederate forces had withdrawn to the Confederate supply depot at Perryville. Blunt, then at Fort Gibson, reassembled a force and led them to Perryville. Arriving there on August 23, 1863, he found that the Confederate commanders, Cooper and Watie, had already left for Boggy Depot. Only a rear guard, commanded by Brigadier General William Steele, remained at Perryville. Steele posted a picket line that included two howitzers to block the road that led into the north side of Perryville. However, the Union troops deployed on both sides of the road and opened fire with their own artillery. The Union forces quickly scattered the Confederate. Blunt secured all supplies he could use and burned the rest, along with the town . Instead of following the retreating Confederates southwest toward Boggy Depot, Blunt proceeded to attack Fort Smith, which he captured on September 1, 1863.

== Aftermath ==
Perryville was at least partially rebuilt after the end of the Civil War, though it did not return to its former importance or population. It survived as a community until about 1872, when the Katy railroad line reached the Choctaw town of Bucklucksy and built a railroad station named McAlester. (Note: The town that grew up around the station was later named McAlester.) Businesses that had stayed in Perryville moved to the area of the station. This marked the end of Perryville. The site is now the location of Chambers, Oklahoma. (Note: Another source gives the name of the community that replaced Perryville as Chambers, Oklahoma)
