= Chunky River =

River in Mississippi

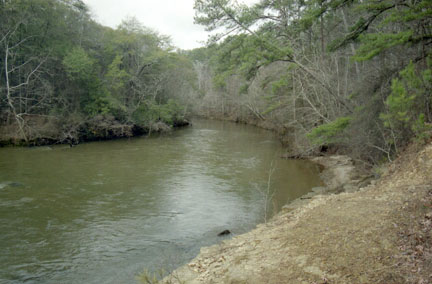
- The Chunky River in Lauderdale County, Mississippi

Location
- Country: United States
- State: Mississippi

Physical characteristics
- Source
  - location: Confluence of Okahatta Creek and Chunky Creek in Newton County, Mississippi
  - coordinates: 32.322514°N 89.976542°W
- Mouth
  - location: Confluence with Okatibbee Creek forming the Chickasawhay River
  - coordinates: 32.182807°N 88.820953°W
- Length: 13.27 mi (21.36 km)
- Basin size: 369 mi^{2} (960 km^{2})

Basin features
- Progression: Chunky River → Chickasawhay River → Pascagoula River → Gulf of Mexico
- GNIS ID: 668444

The Chunky River is a short tributary of the Chickasawhay River in east-central Mississippi. Via the Chickasawhay, it is part of the watershed of the Pascagoula River, which flows into the Gulf of Mexico.

== Course ==
The river is formed between the towns of Hickory and Chunky in southwestern Newton County by the confluence of Chunky Creek and Okahatta Creek. However, older maps continue to call it the Chunky Creek until a point in Lauderdale County. The Chunky River flows generally southeastwardly through southwestern Lauderdale County and northwestern Clarke County, where it joins Okatibbee Creek to form the Chickasawhay River near the town of Enterprise.

Dunn's Falls Water Park is a state park located along the river north of Enterprise.

The historic Stuckey's Bridge spans the river in southern Lauderdale County.

== Name ==
Chunky is a name derived from the Choctaw language, possibly meaning martin (bird) or referring to the game of chunka.

The United States Board on Geographic Names settled on Chunky River as the stream's name in 1963. According to the Geographic Names Information System, it has also been known as:

- Chanki River
- Chunkey Creek
- Chunkey River
- Chunky Creek
- Ectchangui River
- Tchanke River

== See also ==
- List of Mississippi rivers

== Sources ==
- DeLorme (1998). Mississippi Atlas & Gazetteer. Yarmouth, Maine: DeLorme. ISBN 0-89933-346-X.
- U.S. Geological Survey Geographic Names Information System: Chunky River
