= Oklahoma Department of Consumer Credit =

- Great Seal of Oklahoma

Agency overview
- Formed: July 1, 1969
- Headquarters: 629 NE 28th St. Oklahoma City, Oklahoma
- Employees: 15 classified 5 unclassified
- Annual budget: $1.9 million
- Ministers responsible: Bob Moses, Chair of Commission
- Agency executives: Scott Lesher, Administrator; Ruben Tornini, Deputy Administrator
- Website: www.ok.gov/okdocc/index.html

The Oklahoma Department of Consumer Credit (ODCC) is an agency of the state of Oklahoma. The department regulates the consumer lending business in Oklahoma by overseeing non-commercial credit, small loans, installment sales and usury. The department also investigates and licenses creditors of the state.

The department is led by a Consumer Credit Commission, which consists of eight members appointed by the Governor of Oklahoma with the consent of the Oklahoma Senate to serve five-year terms. The State Banking Commissioner serves as a non-voting member of the commission. The department's executive is the Administrator of Consumer Credit who is appointed by the commission.

The department was created in 1969 during the term of Governor Dewey F. Bartlett.

== Organization ==
- Commission on Consumer Credit
  - Administrator
    - Deputy Administrator
      - Licensing Division
      - Examination Division
      - Business Division
      - Legal Division

== Commission on Consumer Credit ==
The Commission on Consumer Credit is the governing body of the department. The commission consists of nine members appointed by the Governor of Oklahoma with the consent of the Oklahoma Senate. Five of those members are appointed at-large members and four members are appointed as follows: one member is recommended by the Oklahoma Consumer Finance Association, one from the Independent Finance Institute, one from the Oklahoma Pawnbrokers Association and one from the Oklahoma Association of Mortgage Professionals. The State Banking Commissioner is a non-voting tenth member of the commission.

The term of each member, excluding the State Banking Commissioner, is five years. Members of the commission are eligible for reappointment. No more than three members-at-large of the commission are to be of the same political party. No more than two of the additional members are to be of the same political party.

The primary duties of the commission include the establishment of rules to regulate to consumer credit market and to appoint the Administrator of the department, who serves at the pleasure of the commission.

== See also ==
- Oklahoma Office of State Finance
- Oklahoma State Banking Department
- Oklahoma Department of Securities
- Oklahoma Tax Commission
