= Hollis E. Roberts =

Native American politician

Hollis Roberts

Chief of the Choctaw Nation of Oklahoma
- In office January 13, 1978 – June 6, 1997
- Deputy: Gregory E. Pyle
- Preceded by: David Gardner
- Succeeded by: Gregory E. Pyle

Member of the Oklahoma House of Representatives
- In office 1975–1979

Hugo City Councilman
- In office 1961–1975

Personal details
- Born: Hollis Earl Roberts; May 9, 1943 Hochatown, Oklahoma, U.S.
- Died: October 19, 2011 (aged 68) Hugo, Oklahoma, U.S.
- Party: Democrat
- Other political affiliations: Red Power

Hollis E. Roberts (May 9, 1943 – October 19, 2011) was a Native American politician whose career was highlighted by his 19-year period as Chief of the Choctaw Nation. His reign saw the tribe modernize its social services and develop independent business partnerships in and beyond Oklahoma.

== Early political career ==
Hollis Roberts was born in Hochatown to Laura Beam Roberts and Darrell E. Roberts. He attended Holly Creek Elementary and Idabel High School, graduating in 1961. Roberts subsequently began his political career as a city council person in Hugo, Oklahoma where he served for 14 years. During this time, in 1963 Roberts married Helen R. Rodriguez, and the couple had three children. Following his time in Hugo, Roberts served four years in the Oklahoma House of Representatives, representing Choctaw County. The county had only a six percent Indian population, making his dramatic victory that much more captivating. Following his time as a member of the Oklahoma House, Roberts served from 1975 to 1978 as Choctaw Chief David Gardner's assistant.

== Election as chief ==
After the untimely death of Chief Gardner from cancer in 1978, Roberts was elected chief of the Choctaw Nation of Oklahoma. A half-blood Choctaw, his election into office came at the tail end of the Red Power movement. As a young, energetic, and charismatic leader, Roberts embodied much of the Red Power Movement and became a guiding voice for change at a time when Indian sovereignty was at a countrywide high. Roberts ran against political rival Charles E. Brown, former leader of the right-wing Choctaw Youth Movement. Brown was a popular, but older politician, who was well respected by Choctaws. Roberts won in a tight election, winning by only 339 votes.

== Accomplishments ==
1983 was big year for both Roberts and the Choctaw. Roberts proposed a new constitution to the Choctaw people. A major component of this new constitution was the removal of blood quantum for tribal membership, which effectively increased the number of members of the Choctaw tribe. The new constitution did not come without controversy; while there was no minimum blood quantum for tribal membership, there was an enforced blood quantum of ¼ to be elected to tribal office. Additionally, women were given the right to vote with the new constitution. This new constitution was voted in 2,253 to 780 on July 9, 1983. Aside from minimal adjustmentsm the Choctaw Constitution remains in force as of 2023. As chief, it was Roberts' job to appoint tribal judges. In 1983 Roberts appointed Juanita Jefferson, the first female Choctaw judge. Roberts was reelected in 1983.

1992 was another big year, where the Choctaw, Cherokee, Chickasaw, and Seminole tribes signed a compact with State of Oklahoma. This compact equates to Indians paying a fee to the federal government each year instead of paying taxes on tobacco products sold to non-natives on their reservations. The result was that the Choctaw paid 75% less to the federal government and were thus able to increase their profit on products sold on the reservations. Roberts worked to improve health standards, increase the tribe's population, and promote a healthy economy. During his time in charge, tuberculosis and infant mortality rates among the Choctaw decreased dramatically. Roberts effectively used his influence and abilities to negotiate federal funding and to set up programs for his people. Under his reign, the Choctaw Nation improved health standards, saw an increase in population, and set forth intensive economic growth campaigns.

== Downfall ==
On June 6, 1997, Roberts’ time as chief came to an end following his conviction in a federal court in Muskogee, Oklahoma, Roberts was convicted on two counts of sexual contact and one count of aggravated sexual abuse involving two female employees of the tribe. The aggravated sexual abuse count carried a possible life sentence; however, he was eventually sentenced to eleven years in prison.

The jury acquitted Mr. Roberts on four similar counts, three of them involving a former tribal employee who testified that Mr. Roberts had raped her. Hollis Roberts attempted an appeal to the U.S. Supreme Court on sexual-abuse convictions and his 11-year prison sentence, but lost both appeals. One of his appeals was that the U.S. District Court lacked jurisdiction where the assaults took place because they happened in Tribal complex property which was trust land and thus not Indian Country nor formally a part of the reservation. The government ruled against this appeal claiming that the federal government owned the land in trust for Indians and it was thus Indian Country. Roberts also argued that he should not have an enhanced sentence for abusing a position of trust.

The council removed Roberts from the office of Chief and replaced him with Gregory E. Pyle. He was imprisoned for eleven years. Following his release in 2008, Roberts returned to Hugo and kept a low profile, and later died on October 19, 2011, at the age of 68 years.

== Legacy ==
Roberts remains an extremely polarizing and controversial figure among Native Americans. His 19-year tenure as Chief of the Choctaw Nation came to end amid convictions of sexual contact and sexual abuse. From these convictions, to his then-extravagant $120,000 per year salary, to his alleged corruption; today many view Roberts as a criminal, but in his heyday many viewed him as a charismatic politician who brought much needed change to the Choctaw. Indeed, he served for 19 years as chief of one of the largest Native American tribes in the United States, overseeing the modernization of the reservation, and conducting massive public-service improvements. He governed well over 195,000 members, including over 79,000 in Oklahoma. Roberts remains, to date, the second-longest serving Choctaw chief, after Harry J. W. Belvin.

Political offices
Preceded by David Gardner	Chief of the Choctaw Nation of Oklahoma; 1978–1997	Succeeded by Gregory E. Pyle
