= Chuck Easttom =

American computer scientist

- Born: William Easttom II; October 5, 1968 (age 58)
- Citizenship: United States
- Education: Capitol Technology University University of Portsmouth University of Texas El Paso Southeastern Oklahoma State University Northcentral University
- Awards: Distinguished Speaker of the ACM; Distinguished Visitor of the IEEE; ACM Senior Member; IEEE Senior Member
- Scientific career
- Fields: Cybersecurity Engineering Cryptography Quantum Computing Nanotechnology Aerospace Engineering Machine Learning Artificial Intelligence
- Workplaces: Vanderbilt University Georgetown University
- Thesis: A Comparative Study Of Lattice Based Algorithms For Post Quantum Computing

William "Chuck" Easttom II (born October 5, 1968) is an American scientist working in computer science, cyber security, cryptography, digital forensics, quantum computing, aerospace engineering, artificial intelligence, machine learning, and systems engineering.

== Education ==
Easttom holds a B.A. from Southeastern Oklahoma State University, a M.Ed. from Southeastern Oklahoma State University, a master's degree in Applied Computer Science from Northcentral University and a master's degree in Systems Engineering from the University of Texas at El Paso, a master's degree in Defense and Strategic Studies from University of Texas at El Paso, as well as a D.Sc. Doctor of Science in cyber security from Capitol Technology University dissertation topic "A Comparative Study Of Lattice Based Algorithms For Post Quantum Computing", a Doctor of Philosophy in Technology focused on Nanotechnology dissertation topic "The Effects of Complexity on Carbon Nanotube Failures", and a Ph.D.Doctor of Philosophy in Computer Science from University of Portsmouth dissertation topic "A Systematic Framework for Network Forensics Using Graph Theory".

== Professional work ==
In addition to computer security, Easttom has done work in software engineering, applied mathematics, aerospace engineering, quantum computing, artificial intelligence, machine learning, and other areas. He has authored 44 books on computer security, programming languages, Linux, cyber forensics, quantum computing, computer networks, penetration testing, and cryptography. His books are used as textbooks for both undergraduate and graduate programs at over 60 universities. He is an inventor with 27 patented computer science inventions. He is a frequent speaker at major cybersecurity conferences.

Easttom was part of the team that created the original CompTIA Security+ and CompTIA Linux+ exams. He created the OSFCE (OSForensics Certified Examiner) course and test, the EC Council Certified Encryption Specialist course and certification test, and EC Council CAST Advanced Encryption course as well as working on other EC-Council certifications

Easttom has been involved in numerous IEEE standards. He is currently the Chair of IEEE P3123 - Artificial Intelligence and Machine Learning (AI/ML) Terminology and Data Formats Working Group, a member of IEEE 2731 BCI unified terminology working group, a former member (2017 to 2019) of IEEE Software & Systems Engineering Standards Committee. Working on the DevOps 2675, a member of IEEE P2995 - Trial-Use Standard for a Quantum Algorithm Design and Development Standards Group, and Vice Chair IEEE P23026 - Systems and Software Engineering—Engineering and Management of Websites for Systems, Software, and Services Information

Chuck Easttom has been interviewed regarding cyber security topics by CNN Money and CBS Smart Planet, and other media outlets, and He has been named a Distinguished Speaker of the ACM and a Distinguished Visitor of the IEEE. He is also a Senior member of the IEEE and Senior member of the ACM. He is also a member of the American Institute of Aeronautics and Astronautics (AIAA).

Easttom was Editor in Chief for the American Journal of Science and Engineering from 2018 to 2022. He was also the director of the Quantum Computing and Cryptography Lab at Capitol Technology University, from 2019 to 2022 he was an adjunct professor for the University of Dallas, he is currently an adjunct lecturer for Georgetown University and an adjunct professor for Vanderbilt University.

Chuck Easttom lives in Plano Texas with his wife Teresa.

== Books ==
Easttom has authored 44 computer science books. These include:

- Beginning JavaScript, 1st Edition.WordWare Publishing (2001)
- JBuilder 7.0 EJB Programming.WordWare Publishing (2002)
- Programming Fundamentals in C++.Charles River Learning. 1st Edition, Charles River Media (2003)
- Essential Linux Administration: A Comprehensive Guide for Beginners. Cengage Press (2011)
- System Forensics, Investigation, and Response, 2nd Edition, Jones & Bartlett (2013)
  - System Forensics, Investigation, and Response (Information Systems Security & Assurance), 3rd Edition Jones and Bartlett (2017) ISBN 978-1284121841
- Certified Cyber Forensics Professional All in One Guide. McGraw-Hill (2014) ISBN 978-0071839761
- Computer Security Fundamentals (3rd Edition). Pearson IT Cybersecurity Curriculum (ITCC) (2016) ISBN 978-0789757463
- CompTIA Security+ Study Guide: Exam SY0-501. John Wiley & Sons (2017)
- Penetration Testing Fundamentals: A Hands-On Guide to Reliable Security Audits (1st Edition). Pearson IT Cybersecurity Curriculum (2018) ISBN 978-0789759375
- CompTIA Security+ Practice Tests: Exam SY0-501. Sybex (2018)
- Network Defense and Countermeasures: Principles and Practices, 3rd Edition Pearson IT Cybersecurity Curriculum (ITCC)) (2018)
- Networking Fundamentals, 3rd Edition. Goodheart-Wilcox Publishing) (2018)
