= List of Choctaw chiefs =

List of Choctaw chiefs is a record of the political leaders who served the Choctaws in Alabama, Louisiana, Mississippi, and Oklahoma.

== Original three divisions ==
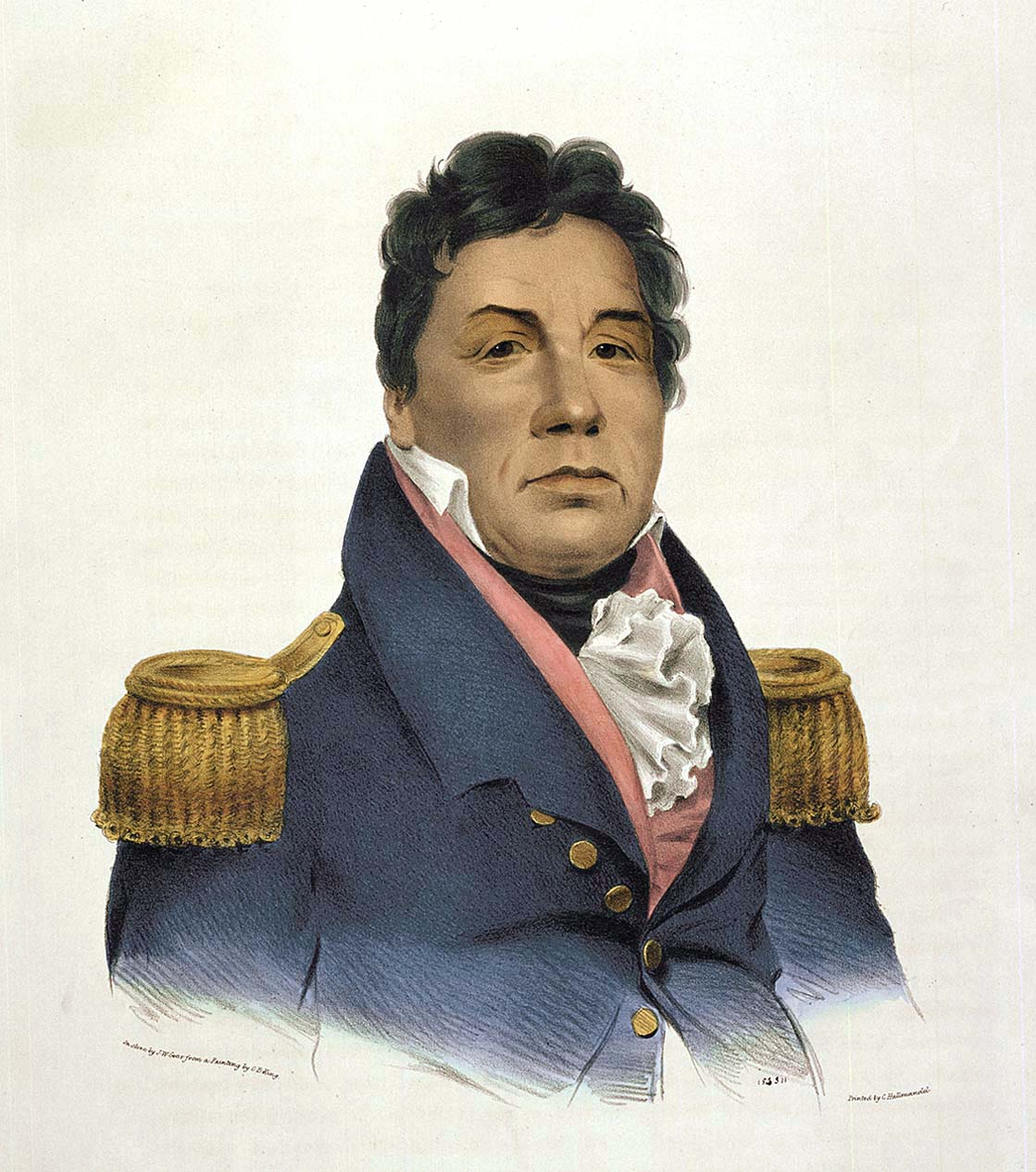
Pushmataha

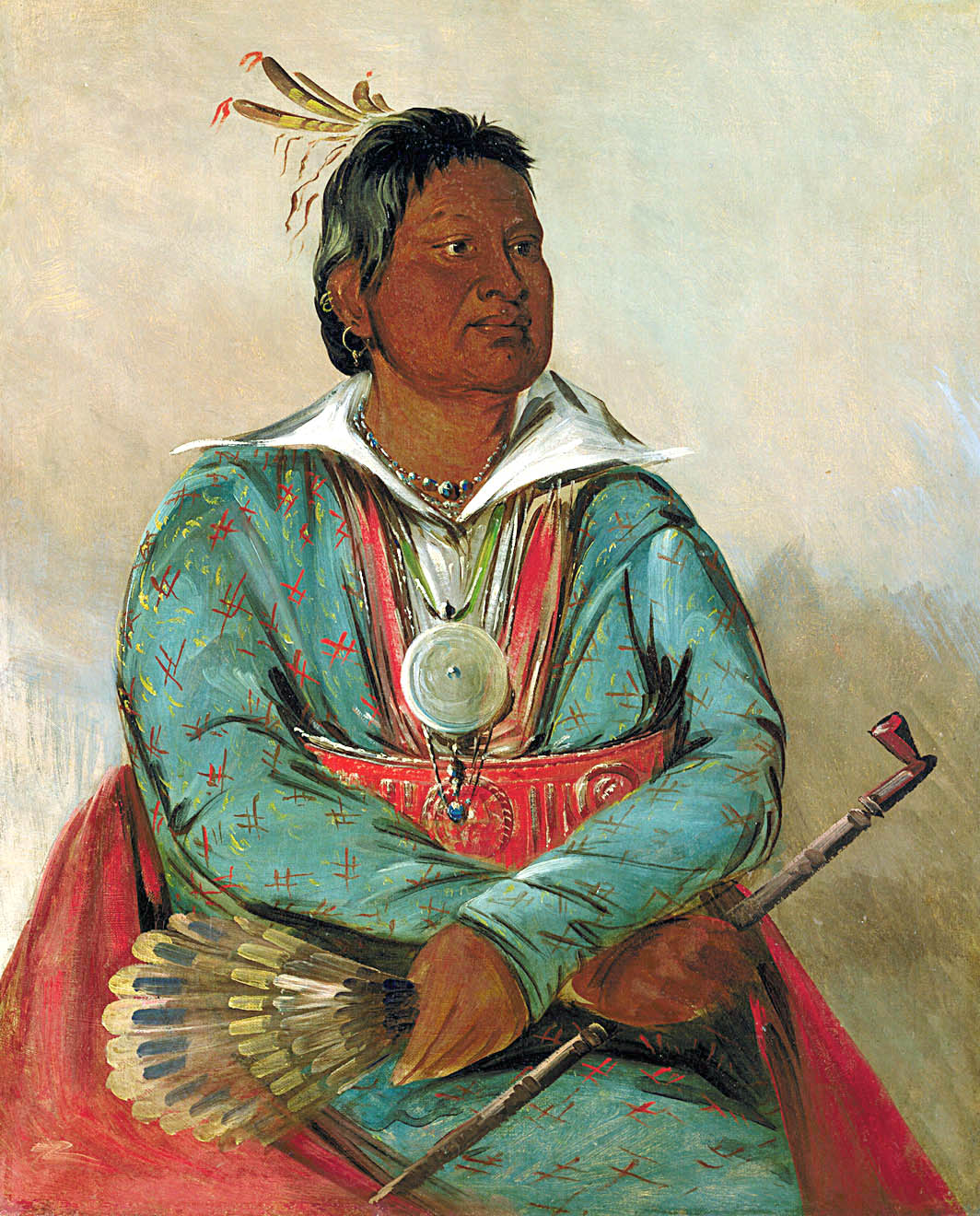
Moshulatubbee

The eastern Choctaw Nation, in what is now Mississippi and Alabama, was divided into three regions: Okla Hannali, Okla Falaya, and Okla Tannip.

=== Okla Hannali (Six Towns) ===
- Yowannee Mingo
- Pushmataha
- Oklahoma or Tapenahomma (Nephew of Pushmataha)
- General Hummingbird
- Nitakechi
- Sam Garland

=== Okla Falaya ===
- Apukshunnubbee
- Robert Cole
- Greenwood Leflore
- Chief Red Turkey Feather of Okla Falaya Clan

=== Okla Tannip ===
- Homastubbee
- Mushulatubbee
- David Folsom

== District Chiefs in the New Indian Territory ==
After removal, the Choctaws set up their government also divided up in three regions: Apukshunnubbee, Mushulatubbee, and Pushmataha. The regions were named after the three influential Choctaw leaders of the "old country."

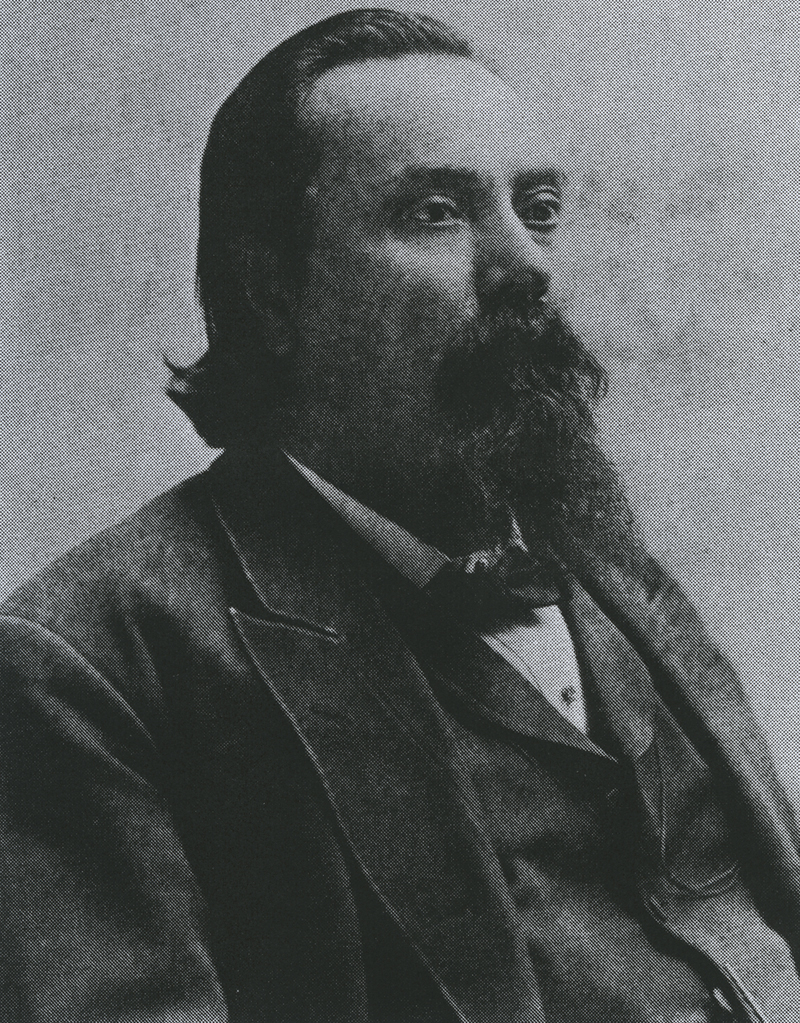
George W. Harkins (1810–1861)

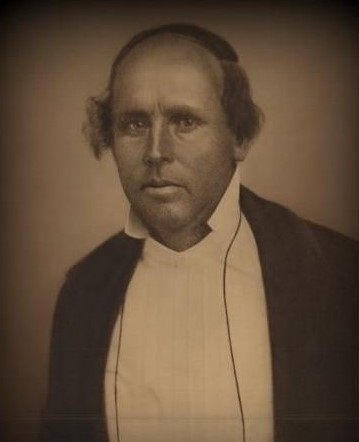
Tandy Walker (1814–1877)

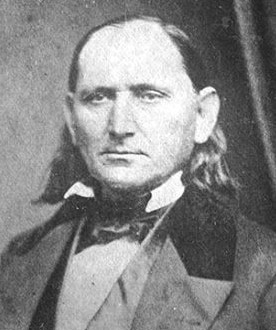
Peter Pitchlynn (1806–1881)

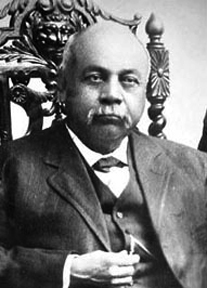
Green McCurtain (1848–1910)

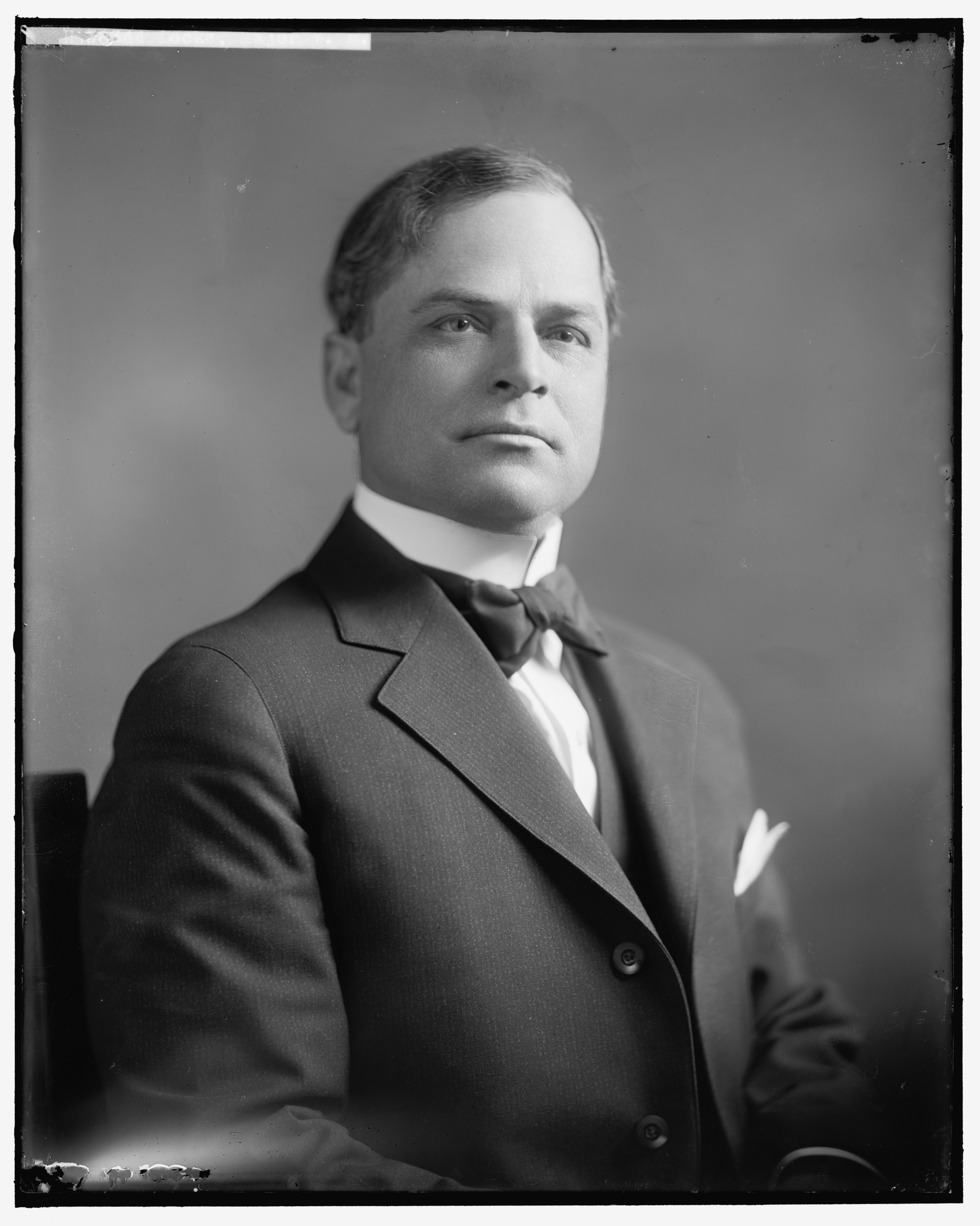
Victor Locke, Jr. (1876–1943)

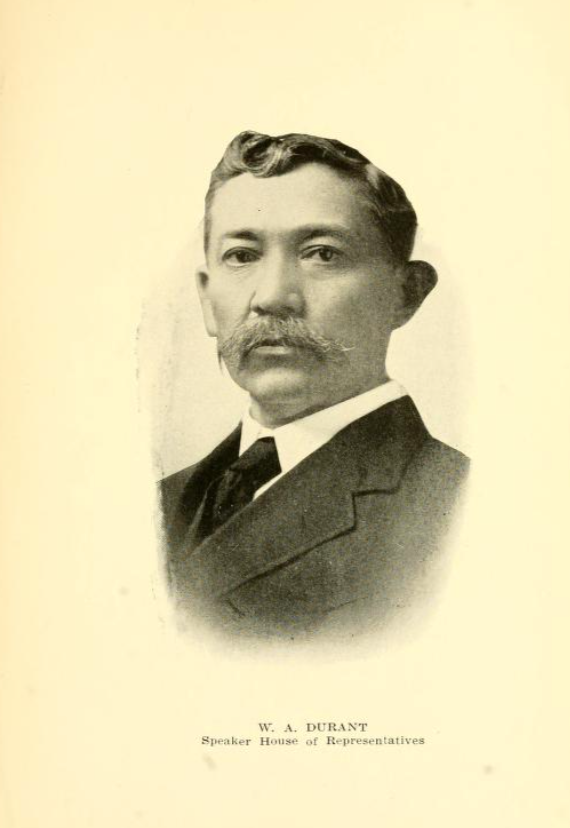
William Durant (1866–1948)

=== Moshulatubbee District ===
- Mushulatubbee, 1834–1836
- Joseph Kincaid, 1836–1838
- John McKinney, 1838–1842
- Nathaniel Folsom, 1842–1846
- Peter Folsom, 1846–1850
- Cornelius McCurtain, 1850–1854
- David McCoy, 1854–1857

=== Apukshunnubbee District ===
- Thomas LeFlore, 1834-1838
- James Fletcher, 1838-1842
- Thomas LeFlore, 1842-1850
- George W. Harkins, 1850–1857

=== Pushmataha District ===
- Nitakechi, 1834-1838
- Pierre Juzan, 1838-1841
- Isaac Folsom, 1841-1846
- Nitakechi, Died
- Salas Fisher, 1846-1854
- George Folsom, 1850-1854
- Nicholas Cochnauer, 1854-1857

=== Unified leadership as governor ===
- Alfred Wade, 1857-1858
- Tandy Walker, 1858-1859
- Basil LeFlore, 1859-1860

=== Principal Chiefs ===
- George Hudson, 1860-1862
- Samuel Garland, 1862-1864
- Peter Pitchlynn, 1864-1866
- Allen Wright, 1866-1870
- William Bryant, 1870-1874
- Coleman Cole, 1874-1878
- Isaac Garvin, 1878-1880
- Jackson McCurtain, 1880-1884
- Edmund McCurtain, 1884-1886
- Thompson McKinney, 1886-1888
- Benjamin Franklin Smallwood, 1888-1890
- Wilson Jones, 1890-1894
- Jefferson Gardner, 1894-1896
- Green McCurtain, 1896-1900
- Gilbert Dukes, 1900-1902
- Green McCurtain, 1902-1906

The Choctaw Nation was temporarily discontinued in 1906 with the advent of Oklahoma statehood.

== Choctaw Nation "token" government ==
Chiefs were appointed by the U.S. President after U. S. Congress stripped recognition of the Choctaw national government.

- Green McCurtain, 1906-1910, appointed by President Theodore Roosevelt
- Victor Locke, Jr., 1910-1918, appointed by President Howard Taft
- William F. Semple, 1918-1922, appointed by President Woodrow Wilson
- William H. Harrison, 1922-1929, appointed by President Warren G. Harding
- Ben Dwight, 1930-1936, appointed by President Herbert Hoover
- William Durant, 1937-1948, appointed by President Franklin Delano Roosevelt
- Harry J. W. Belvin, 1948-1970, appointed by President Harry S. Truman
  (Choctaw were allowed to elect their delegate in 1948 and 1954 which the president confirmed.)

== Current tribes ==
Indian termination policy was a policy that the United States Congress legislated in 1953 to assimilate the Native American communities with mainstream America. In 1959, the Choctaw Termination Act was passed. Unless repealed by the federal government, the Choctaw Nation of Oklahoma would effectively be terminated as a sovereign nation as of August 25, 1970.

After a long struggle for recognition, the Mississippi Choctaw received recognition in 1918. The Mississippi Choctaw soon received lands, educational benefits, and a long overdue health care system.

In 1945, lands in Neshoba County, Mississippi and the surrounding counties were set aside as a federal Indian reservation. There are eight communities of reservation land: Bogue Chitto, Bogue Homa, Conehatta, Crystal Ridge, Pearl River, Red Water, Tucker, and Standing Pine. The Indian Reorganization Act of 1934 allowed the Mississippi Choctaws to become re-organized on April 20, 1945 as the Mississippi Band of Choctaw Indians.

=== Oklahoma Choctaws ===
==== Choctaw Nation of Oklahoma ====
- Harry J. W. Belvin, 1948, 1954, 1971–1975
- C. David Gardner, 1975–1978
- Hollis E. Roberts, 1978–1997
- Gregory E. Pyle, 1997–2014
- Gary Batton, 2014–Present

=== Mississippi Choctaws ===
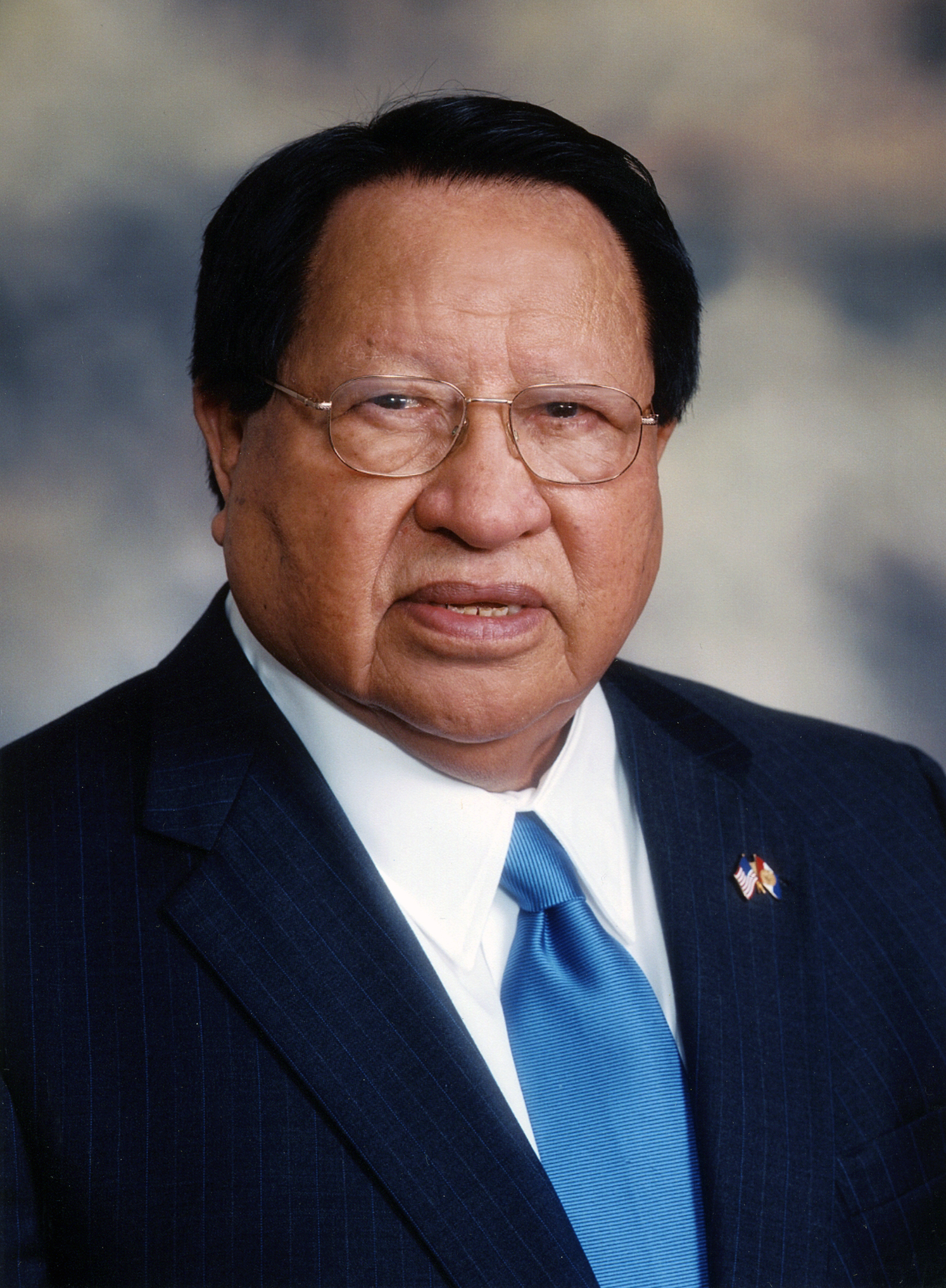
Mississippi Band Chief Phillip Martin (1926–2010)

==== Pre-reorganization Era (Before 1945) ====
- Wesley Johnson (Wesley Wakatubee), 1913-c. 1914 (Chief)
- Ed Willis
- Pat Chitto
- Joe Chitto

==== Mississippi Band of Choctaw Indians (1945-Present) ====
- Emmette York (Chairman)
- Phillip Martin (Chairman)
- Calvin Isaac (Chief)
- Phillip Martin, 1978—2007 (Chief)
- Beasley Denson, 2007—2011 (Chief/Miko)
- Phyliss J. Anderson, 2011—2019 (Chief)
- Cyrus Ben, 2019—present (Chief)

=== Louisiana Choctaws ===
==== Jena Band of Choctaw Indians ====
- Christina M. Norris, present
