= Gary Batton =

47th Chief of the Choctaw Nation of Oklahoma

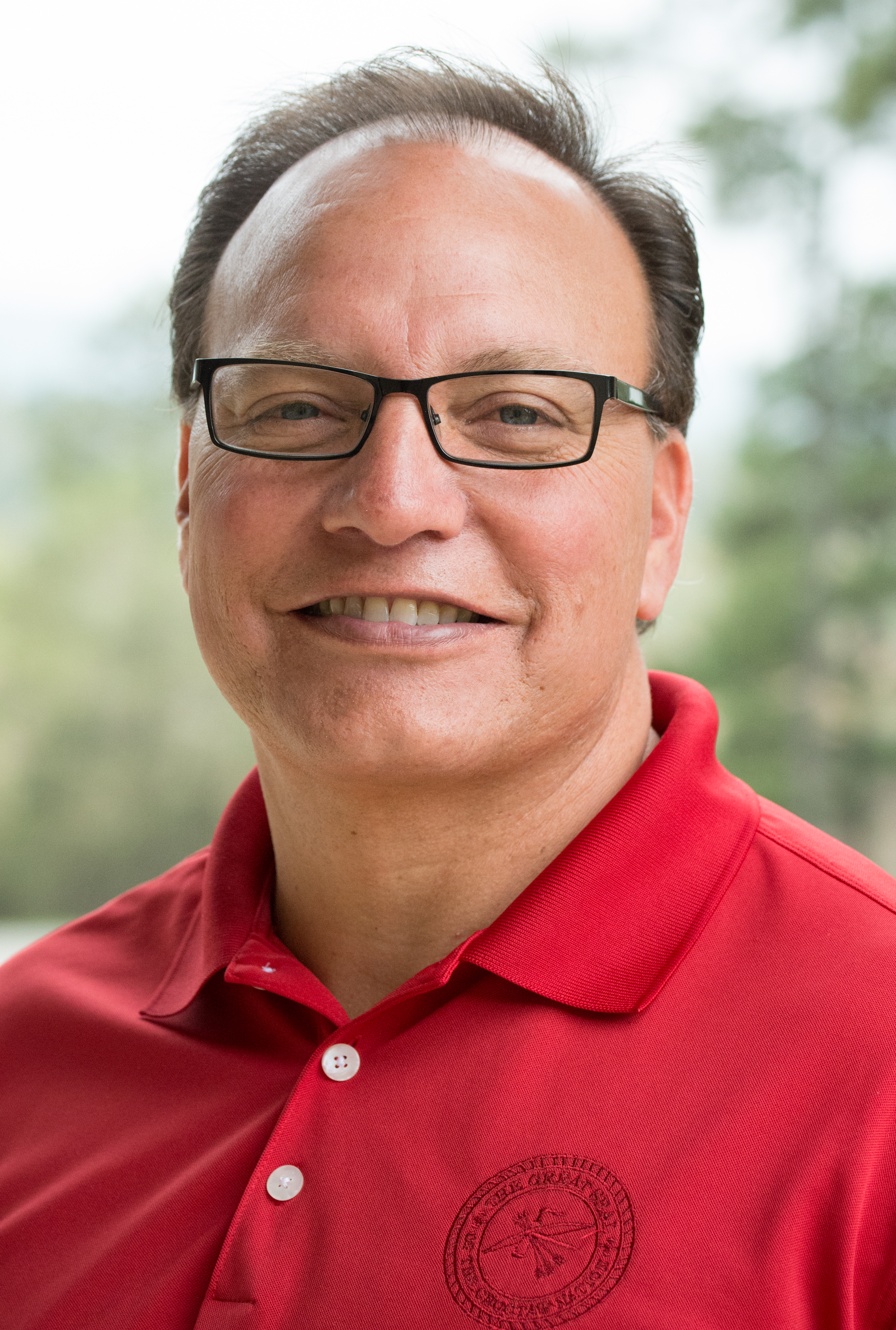
- Batton in 2015

Chief of the Choctaw Nation
- Incumbent
- Assumed office April 28, 2014
- Deputy: Jack Austin
- Preceded by: Gregory E. Pyle

Assistant Chief of the Choctaw Nation
- In office May 31, 2007 – April 28, 2014
- Leader: Gregory E. Pyle
- Preceded by: Mike Bailey
- Succeeded by: Jack Austin, Jr.

Personal details
- Born: December 15, 1966 (age 59) Wichita, Kansas, U.S.
- Party: Republican
- Spouse: Angela Batton
- Children: 2
- Education: Southeastern Oklahoma State University (BA)

Gary Dale Batton (born December 15, 1966) is a tribal administrator and politician, the current and 47th Chief of the Choctaw Nation of Oklahoma. It is the third-largest federally recognized tribe and second-largest reservation in total area.

Batton was appointed as Chief on April 28, 2014, upon Chief Gregory E. Pyle's retirement. He was elected as Chief in his own right in a general election on July 11, 2015, with 86.5% of the vote. In 2019, Batton was unopposed in seeking a second full term. He was subsequently unopposed in seeking a third full term in 2023.

== Early life ==
Batton was born on December 15, 1966, in Wichita, Kansas. His mother was fully Choctaw, and his father was of undisclosed heritage, hailing from West Virginia. His family moved to Oklahoma, where he graduated from Clayton High School in Clayton, Oklahoma, in 1985. He attended Southeastern Oklahoma State University, graduating in 1989 with a bachelor's degree in Business Management.

Batton had begun working for the Choctaw Nation in 1987 as a clerk in the Purchasing Department. Upon graduating from SOSU, he was selected for the position of deputy director of the Choctaw Nation Housing Authority.

== Career ==
In 1997, he was chosen as executive director of the Choctaw Nation Health Services Authority. Upon the retirement of Assistant Chief Mike Bailey in May 2007, Batton was selected as Assistant Chief. During his career as executive director, Batton assisted by adding, replacing, and expanding clinics, as well as enhancing the treatment of alcohol and drug abuse.

After the retirement of Chief Gregory E. Pyle in April 2014, Batton was appointed by the tribal council as acting Chief. At that time, he had served 17 years in office, including 13 years as Assistant Chief.

During that time, the tribe was embroiled in allegations of corruption by contractors and a tribal officer related to construction projects, including one for a casino. Neither Pyle nor Batton were charged in relation to this federal case. By November 2014, six men had pleaded guilty in a "fraudulent purchase of $8.5 million in steel for a casino project." On November 20, Jason Brett Merida, executive director of construction for the Choctaw Nation of Oklahoma, was found guilty on six counts of a seven-count indictment.

On July 11, 2015, Batton was elected as Chief in his own right in the general election with 86.5% of the vote. On September 7, he was sworn in as Chief of the Choctaw Nation of Oklahoma for a four-year term. (The person occupying this office may be elected to an unlimited number of four-year terms.) Batton filed to run for a second term in the 2019 election, where he was reelected as Chief. Batton led the tribe in talks with the federal government under the Obama, first Trump, Biden, and second Trump administrations.

Batton stood for reelection in 2023 with no opposition.

== Positions ==
Batton has faced pressure from some in the U.S. Congress over the tribe's refusal to extend citizenship to freedmen, to the point where Maxine Waters (D-CA) threatened to withhold housing funds unless the tribe relented. The tribe currently excludes freedmen under the rule that they are not "Choctaw by-blood", as defined in the 1983 Constitution. Ultimately, the congressional threat went nowhere. Batton insists that refusing citizenship to the freedmen is "not a race issue", and was joined by Dr. Carter Blue Clark, a Muscogee Nation citizen and a professor of Indigenous Law at Oklahoma City University, in claiming it is an issue of tribal sovereignty, and no business of the federal government.

Although a registered Republican, Batton joined his fellow chiefs of the Five Tribes to endorse Democrat Joy Hofmeister for governor against incumbent Republican Kevin Stitt in 2022. His decision was reportedly criticized by some in the tribal council, as the tribes had remained neutral to this point and never endorsed state-wide candidates before.

Although the Choctaw Constitution explicitly outlaws same-sex marriage, in May 2023, the Choctaw Constitutional Court ruled that tribal members have a right to marry, regardless of gender. The court claimed the tribal constitution was restricting the rights of tribal citizens, which are guaranteed to them under federal law via the 14th Amendment. After the ruling, Batton took no steps to challenge the court, instead stating "we offer our love and support to the family involved in this case."

== Personal life ==
Batton lives in Clayton, Oklahoma, with his wife, Angie. They have two children and two grandchildren.

== Elections ==
2015 Choctaw Nation Principal Chief Election
Candidate	Votes	%
Gary Batton (incumbent)	21,785	86.84%
Deborah Battiest-Tomasi	3,301	13.16%
Total votes	25,086	100%

Political offices
Preceded by Gregory E. Pyle	Chief of the Choctaw Nation of Oklahoma; 2014–present	Incumbent
