= Gregory E. Pyle =

Native American politician (1949–2019)

Greg Pyle
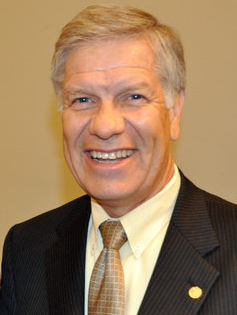

Chief of the Choctaw Nation of Oklahoma
- In office June 9, 1997 – April 28, 2014
- Deputy: Mike Bailey; Gary Batton
- Preceded by: Hollis E. Roberts
- Succeeded by: Gary Batton

Assistant Chief of the Choctaw Nation
- In office May 31, 1984 – June 9, 1997
- Leader: Hollis E. Roberts
- Preceded by: Hollis E. Roberts
- Succeeded by: Mike Bailey

Personal details
- Born: Gregory Eli Pyle; April 25, 1949 Fort Bragg, California, U.S.
- Died: October 26, 2019 (aged 70)
- Party: Democratic
- Education: Southeastern Oklahoma State University (BA)

Gregory Eli Pyle (April 25, 1949 – October 26, 2019) was a Native American politician who was a long-term political leader of the Choctaw Nation of Oklahoma. He was elected as Principal Chief in 1997 and re-elected since by wide margins, reigning for almost 17 years. He resigned on April 21, 2014, effective April 28, 2014. Prior to serving as Principal Chief, he had served as Assistant Chief for 13 years. He began to work for the Choctaw Nation in 1975 as a personnel officer.

== Early life and education ==
Pyle graduated from Southeastern Oklahoma State University and was a member of Tau Kappa Epsilon fraternity.

== Chief of the Choctaw Nation of Oklahoma ==
Pyle was sworn in on June 9, 1997 as Chief of the Choctaw Nation. He promised to see that all Congressional actions continued to be closely monitored and that the tribe has a direct input into all legislative acts that affect the Choctaw.

Chief Pyle announced his resignation from office at a party to celebrate his 65th birthday, with an effective date of April 28, 2014. Gary Batton, Assistant Chief under Pyle, assumed the role of Chief of the Choctaw Nation.

Chief Pyle died on October 26, 2019, at his home in the Choctaw Nation, aged 70, of unknown causes.

== Public service ==
- 1982 – Hired as Personnel Officer
- 1982 – Appointed to Arkansas Riverbed Board
- 1983 – Became Tribal Program Monitor to oversee and assure contract compliance of all federally funded programs being run by the tribe.
- Testified before Congress for the Arkansas Riverbed case, which was won by the Choctaw, Cherokee and Chickasaw nations.
- 1984 – Elected as Assistant Chief of the Choctaw Nation
- Appointed by Secretary of Interior Manuel Lujan Jr. to serve on a national Task Force to reorganize the Bureau of Indian Affairs. Two years later reappointed by Secretary of Interior Bruce Babbitt and headed up several subcommittees on the Task Force.
- 1994 – Appointed to the Inter Tribal Council of the Five Civilized Tribes.
- 1996 – Served as the President of the Oklahoma Area Health Board and was also a member of the National Health Board.
- 1997 – Served on Board of Directors of Landmark Bank and Durant Chamber of Commerce.

Political offices
Preceded by Hollis E. Roberts	Chief of the Choctaw Nation of Oklahoma; 1997–2014	Succeeded by Gary Batton
