= Mick Thompson =

American banker and politician

Oklahoma State Banking Commissioner
- Incumbent
- Assumed office September 1, 1992
- Governor: David Walters 1992-1995; Frank Keating 1995-2003; Brad Henry 2003-2011; Mary Fallin 2011-2019; Kevin Stitt

Oklahoma House Majority Leader
- In office 1983–1984

Oklahoma State Representative from Poteau, Oklahoma
- In office 1976–1984

Personal details
- Born: Poteau, Oklahoma
- Party: Democratic
- Education: Southeastern Oklahoma State University; Northeastern State University; University of Colorado at Boulder
- Occupation: Banker, Politician

Mick Thompson is an American banker and politician from Oklahoma who is serving as the State Banking Commissioner for the State of Oklahoma. Thompson was initially appointed by Governor of Oklahoma David Walters in 1992, and reappointed by Governor Frank Keating in 1996 and 2000. Governor Brad Henry reappointed Thompson in 2004 and 2008. In 2012, Thompson was reappointed by Governor Mary Fallin.

== Early life and career ==
Thompson earned his bachelor's degree from Southeastern Oklahoma State University, his master's from Northeastern State University and also holds a graduate degree in banking from the University of Colorado at Boulder. After finishing his education, Thompson joined the Central National Bank in Poteau, Oklahoma, eventually serving as that bank's executive vice president from 1977 to 1990.

== State representative ==
In 1976, Thompson was elected as a Democrat to the Oklahoma House of Representatives. During his tenure as a State Representative, Thompson would chair the House Banking and Finance Committee and even serve as the House's Majority Floor Leader from 1983 to 1984, the House's third highest position. Under Thompson's tenure as chair of the banking committee, the Oklahoma Legislature enacted Oklahoma's first branch banking and multi-bank holding company laws.

After leaving the Legislature, Thompson became the President of the Oklahoma Community Banking Association from 1988 to 1990.

== State Banking Department ==
Following the election of Democrat David Walters as Governor of Oklahoma in 1991, Thompson served as Governor Walter's Director of Communications. In September 1992, Walters appointed Thompson to serve as the Oklahoma State Banking Commissioner. As Banking Commissioner, Thompson is responsible for overseeing the State Banking Department, chairing the State Banking Board, and regulating the financial services industry in Oklahoma.

Frank Keating, Walter's successor as governor, reappointed Thompson in 1996 and 2000. Brad Henry, Keating's successor, reappointed Thompson in 2004 and 2008. Henry's successor, Governor Mary Fallin, reappointed Thompson in 2012.

== Personal life ==
Thompson resides in Edmond, Oklahoma.

Political offices
Preceded by	Oklahoma State Representative; 1977 - 1985	Succeeded by
Preceded by	Oklahoma State Banking Commissioner; Under Governors David Walters, Frank Keating, Brad Henry and Mary Fallin; September 1, 1992 - present	Incumbent
