= Harry J. W. Belvin =

Native American politician

Jimmy Belvin

Chief of the Choctaw Nation of Oklahoma
- In office 1948–1975
- Preceded by: William A. Durant
- Succeeded by: David Gardner

Member of the Oklahoma Senate from the 20th district
- In office 1961–1965
- Preceded by: Keith Cartwright
- Succeeded by: Roy Grantham

Member of the Oklahoma House of Representatives from the 20th district
- In office 1955–1961
- Preceded by: James Douglas
- Succeeded by: Sam Sullivan

Personal details
- Born: Harry James Watson Belvin; December 11, 1900 Boswell, Indian Territory
- Died: September 19, 1986 (aged 85) Durant, Oklahoma, U.S.
- Party: Democratic
- Spouse: Lucille Brightwell
- Children: 1
- Education: Southeastern Oklahoma State University (BS); University of Oklahoma (MEd)
- Nickname: "The Little Warrior"

Harry James Watson "Jimmy" Belvin (1900–1986) was a Choctaw educator and politician who served as an Oklahoma State Representative and Senator. He was the first elected principal chief of any of the Five Civilized Tribes in the 20th century, and the longest serving principal chief of the Choctaw Nation of Oklahoma. He saw his tribe through termination, restoration, and a rebirth of Native Pride. He was a polarizing leader, seen by some as a semi-dictator who held onto the office of principal chief and used his power to advocate for complete assimilation into the dominant society, suppressing Choctaw traditions, language and ceremonial practices as undesirable remnants of an unrefined history. To others, he was a well-liked, populist leader, who went door-to-door talking with tribe members, informing them on issues, and trying to develop the means to alleviate the poverty and unemployment they faced.

== Early life ==
Jimmy Belvin was born in Boswell, Choctaw County, Indian Territory on December 11, 1900 to Watson J. and Mabel Powers Belvin. He was a direct descendant of the original Belvins who were forced over the Trail of Tears from the Choctaw homeland in Mississippi to Indian Territory. He attended school in Boswell and graduated from Southeastern Teachers College with a Bachelor of Science degree, going on to earn a Master's of Education at the University of Oklahoma which he completed in 1941.

Belvin taught school at Mayhew, Bryan County and in Choctaw County from 1923 until 1939. In 1941 he was elected Bryan County Superintendent of Public Instruction, a position he held until 1952. He then began operating a Hereford cattle ranch in Bryan and Choctaw counties.

After his first successful election to the Oklahoma legislature in 1955, Belvin served three terms in the Oklahoma State House of Representatives representing Bryan County. In 1960, he was elected as an Oklahoma State Senator.

== Coal and asphalt lands ==
As early as 1946, support for Belvin becoming principal chief had been growing. William A. Durant had served since 1937, and was seen as having made little headway on selling the asphalt lands of the Choctaw and Chickasaw. At issue were some 400,000 acres (1,600 km^{2}) of lands that were jointly owned by the Choctaw and Chickasaw tribes. Based on a 1902 agreement, the US had agreed to purchase these lands within three years, but had still not done so. In 1946, Chief Durant and Chickasaw Governor Floyd Maytubby were asking for $33.1 million which the US government valued at $2.2 million. Belvin was, on the other hand was seen as an educated, galvanized leader who wanted to revitalize the tribe. Even before he was chief, he wrote long letters to Congressman Carl Albert, Congressman William Stigler, Senator Elmer Thomas, Senator Edward H. Moore, the Bureau of Indian Affairs office, and the Superintendent of the Five Civilized Tribes criticizing the delays in finalizing the purchase.

When a settlement was finally reached of $8.5 million, Belvin again launched a letter-writing campaign questioning why the settlement was reached without allowing representatives of the Choctaw-Chickasaw Confederation to attend the negotiations. Considering that the land contained 770 million tons of readily available coal, another 1 billion tons of reserve coal and asphalt, and was near a recent oil strike, Belvin questioned how the coal could be valued at 1 cent per ton and the reserve coal, valued at 0.1 cent per ton. Belvin was also highly critical of the fact that Chief Durant had not attended the negotiations, leaving the decision of "the most momentous meeting affecting the tribe's welfare since the Atoka Agreement of 1897" up to Maytubby and the Choctaw Tribal attorney.

Choctaw-Chickasaw Confederation was officially created on 9 January 1947, though it had operated for several years, as a means for the tribes to track tribal assets, hold meetings and discussions and disseminate information outside of the "official" BIA structure. After the sale had been negotiated, Belvin wrote letters as president of the Confederation to tribal members and urged them to attend informational meetings and decide whether or not they wanted to accept the offer. He did not give his own opinions, but urged each tribemember to vote according to their own conscience. Though he thought the settlement amount was undervalued, once he became chief, Belvin stopped criticizing the amount and strove to collect the distribution so desperately needed by his poverty stricken tribe members.

== Choctaw Principal Chief ==
Belvin was first elected as Principal Chief of the Choctaw Nation in 1948. In fact, he was the first elected chief of any of the Five Civilized Tribes and of the Choctaw Nation in the 20th century. All chiefs of the Five Civilized Tribes of Oklahoma since the implementation of the Dawes Act had been appointed by the president upon recommendation from the BIA. Until the 1970s, the only two exceptions to presidential appointment were that in 1948 and again in 1954, the Choctaw were allowed to elect their chief. Both times, they elected Belvin, though voting was limited to a fraction of the eligible enrollees.

In the lead up to the 1954 election, the Department of the Interior informed Belvin that they did not believe the tribe warranted a full-time chief. Belvin contacted Congressman Carl Albert, also a proponent of tribal democracy, who worked behind the scenes to keep the Choctaw Principal Chief as a full-time position. Belvin believed so strongly in the right of the tribes to elect their own governance, that he persuaded the Chickasaw to press for their own elections. Though the Chickasaw tried for many years to convince the Bureau of Indian Affairs to allow them to vote on their own leadership, their requests were ignored.

=== Inter-Tribal Council of the Five Civilized Tribes ===
There had been several joint relationships among the Five Civilized Tribes throughout their history—the 1842 Inter-Tribal Council of the Deep Fork River, the 1861 United Nations of Indian Territory, and the 1866 Okmulgee Council. Because of their similar histories and situations in Oklahoma, with removal, allotment, and government oversight, there was a recognition that tribal goals for development, education, services for tribe members, health initiatives and poverty alleviation were virtually the same and working together would be of benefit. In fact, informally the tribes had already been working jointly on projects. In March, 1949, Belvin had gone to Washington, DC not only to prod lawmakers regarding the coal and asphalt settlement, but to present a proposal drawn up by representatives of the five tribes as a far-reaching "relief" plan. They proposed more effective administration of Indian affairs, a new land policy, rehabilitation, education, health, conservation, and road building and maintenance as the means to alleviate distress in their nations and had obtained the endorsement from the local agency office.

In September and October 1949, the leaders of the Five Civilized Tribes met in Muskogee, Oklahoma and formed the Inter-Tribal Council of the Five Civilized Tribes (ITC). They pledged to work together to attain for themselves and their descendants the rights and benefits which they were entitled to under law, state or federal, and to seek equity for tribal affairs and tribe members by promoting the common welfare of American Indians. The constitution of the organization was approved on February 3, 1950. Inter-Tribal Council membership includes the principal chief and four members from each of the Cherokee, Chickasaw, Choctaw, Creek and Seminole nations.

Belvin served on the ITC from its founding in 1949 through 1975. After obtaining Congressional approval, and pressing for the withdrawal of House Concurrent Resolution 108, the ITC has spent over a half-century of activity focusing on education, health care, housing, and sovereignty to serve the special cultural, economic, and social needs of all tribespeople.

=== Termination ===
As part of the Indian termination policy pursued by the US government from the 1940s through the 1960s, a series of laws were passed to enable the government to end its trust relationships with native tribes. One of the first of these laws passed on August 13, 1946—the Indian Claims Commission Act of 1946, Pub. L. No. 79-726, ch. 959. Its purpose was to settle for all time any outstanding grievances or claims the tribes might have against the U.S. for treaty breaches, unauthorized taking of land, dishonorable or unfair dealings, or inadequate compensation. Claims had to be filed within a five-year period, and most of the 370 complaints that were submitted were filed at the approach of the 5-year deadline in August, 1951. In 1946, the government had appropriated funds for the tribal sale of coal and asphalt resources, but had charged almost 10% of the $8.5 million award in administrative fees.

When Belvin became chief in 1948, he realized that only federally recognized tribes were allowed to file a claim with the commission. If he wanted to get that money back, his tribe needed to reorganize. He created a democratically elected tribal council and a constitution to re-establish a government, but his efforts were opposed by the Area Director of the Bureau of Indian Affairs. Ultimately, the tribe was able to file a claim for around $750,000 with the Commission in 1951 on a technicality. The suit was classified as a renewal of the 1944 case against the US Court of Claims, but that did not stop the antagonism between Belvin and the area BIA officials. The BIA had had management issues for decades. Poorly trained personnel, inefficiency, corruption, and lack of consistent policy plagued the organization almost from its founding. For Belvin, relief from BIA oversight of policies and funds seemed as if it might pave the way for the Choctaw to maintain their own traditional ways of operating and reform their own governing council.

Early on, it may also be that Belvin believed termination was what the tribe wanted. In a 1954 presentation to the Intertribal Council of the Five Civilized Tribes, he told the chiefs of the Cherokee, Chickasaw, Creek and Seminole nations that the majority of Choctaw were not interested in tribal affairs and supported discontinuance of the tribe. But he also stated in an interview that same year with the Lubbock Avalanche, that he thought proposing termination was another way for the government to "shirk its responsibility to a people who owned the entire continent of North America when the white man first invaded, not discovered, this country".

After eleven years as Choctaw chief, Belvin persuaded Representative Carl Albert of Oklahoma to introduce federal legislation to begin terminating the Choctaw tribe. What Belvin proposed was relief from the paternalistic watch of the BIA, which allowed the tribe to choose their own chiefs and handle tribal business and assets without federal supervision. On 23 April 1959, the BIA confirmed that H.R.2722 had been submitted to Congress at the request of the tribe, and would sell all remaining tribal assets, but would not affect any individual Choctaw earnings. It also provided for retention of half of all mineral rights which could be managed by a tribal corporation.

On 25 August 1959, Congress passed a bill to terminate the tribe, which was later called Belvin's law, as he was the main advocate behind it. Belvin created overwhelming support for termination among tribespeople through his promotion of the bill, describing the process and expected outcomes. What Belvin envisioned was that the high unemployment and poverty which existed in the nation would be offset by the per capita payment that tribe members would receive from liquidation of the tribal assets. Tribal members later interviewed said that Belvin never used the word "termination" for what he was describing, and many people were unaware he was proposing termination. In actuality, the provisions of the bill were intended to be a final disposition of all trust obligations and a final "dissolution of the tribal governments." Belvin claimed that he was misled and that the BIA did not pass the legislation the Choctaw proposed, as it did affect individual Choctaws and the relationships they had with the government and programs.

The original Act was to have expired in 1962, but was amended twice to allow more time to sell the tribal assets. As time wore on, Belvin realized that the bill severed the tribe members' access to government loans and other services, including the tribal tax exemption. By 1967, he had asked Oklahoma Congressman Ed Edmondson to try to repeal the termination act. Belvin's views were not just contained in private letters. In a 1967 newspaper account, he stated that the tribe needed to determine whether to outright repeal the 1959 Choctaw Termination Act or whether they wanted to form a tribal corporation to manage tribal affairs without supervision of the federal government. In addition, both Oklahomans, House Majority Leader Carl Albert and Senator Fred R. Harris, as well as Louis R. Bruce, Commissioner of Indian Affairs, were in support of the Choctaw request to kill the bill.

By the late 1960s public sentiment was changing as well. The Choctaw people had seen what termination could do to tribes, since they witnessed the process with four other tribes in Oklahoma: the Wyandotte Nation, Peoria Tribe of Indians of Oklahoma, Ottawa Tribe of Oklahoma, and Modoc Tribe of Oklahoma. In 1969, ten years after passage of the Choctaw termination bill and one year before the Choctaws were to be terminated, word spread throughout the tribe that Belvin's law was a termination bill. The Choctaw Youth Movement fought politically against the termination law and helped create a new sense of tribal pride, especially among younger generations. Congress finally repealed the law on August 24, 1970.

=== Choctaw Youth Movement ===
In 1969, one year before the termination bill was scheduled to go into effect (officially 25 August 1970) Jim Wade, son of Talihina's police chief, told Charles E. Brown, that the government was dissolving the Choctaw tribe. Alarmed, and believing that most Choctaw did not realize "Belvin's law" was a termination bill rather than a per capita payment bill, Brown began organizing other urban Choctaw, primarily in the Oklahoma City area. With a key group of organizers they began using kin networks to contact Choctaw relatives throughout the country and traditional Choctaw Nation to urge them to fight against termination and be proud of their Choctaw heritage. They printed a newsletter called Hello Choctaws and lobbied Congress and the BIA to stop termination. It is clear that the youth activists felt Belvin was in favor of termination and that he was a traitor to tribal objectives. It is equally clear that Belvin felt that activists were personally attacking him and that he scheduled meetings throughout the Choctaw Nation to justify his actions.

It is hard to judge the effectiveness of the Choctaw Youth Movement in actually overturning the termination legislation. Public sentiment was changing with the passage of the Indian Civil Rights Act of 1968, the Supreme Court ruling in the Menominee Tribe v. United States decision and even President Lyndon B. Johnson was advocating for policy which "ends the old debate about "termination" of Indian programs and stresses self-determination". Belvin had been speaking publicly and pressing legislators to overturn the legislation for at least two years and he was a proponent of tribes having the autonomy to elect their own leadership. In those goals, he and the youth activists were not far apart, as, after stopping termination, one of the activist's primary goals was the ability to elect their own tribal chief. Activists saw the BIA appointment of their leadership as an infringement on their identity as a sovereign people.

Where Belvin and youth activists differed was that Belvin seemed to see the tribe as a simple corporate entity whose role was to manage tribal assets. Activists saw the tribe as a multifaceted organization which spurred community development and fostered Choctaw identity. What the movement did in unequivocal terms was foster pride in being Choctaw and brought about a rebirth in Choctaw nationalism.

=== Indian Education ===
As a teacher and educator, Belvin had on ongoing interest in furthering education for Native Americans. He participated in the 1956 American Indian Institute Conference at the University of Oklahoma and urged that education had to include teaching underprivileged Indians the skills necessary to earn a living. He acknowledged that while education would bring about economic change, for Indians to progress they "could not neglect the culture and heritage" that they had contributed to the country. Belvin agreed to serve on the institute's planning committee for the following year.

In 1959, a dispute among the Mississippi Choctaw found Belvin encouraging support for a Choctaw high school in Mississippi. Victor Kaneubbe, a worker at a Baptist mission in Philadelphia, Mississippi was an Oklahoma Choctaw with a white wife and a mixed-blood daughter, who was unable to attend either the agency schools or white schools in Mississippi. Choctaw administrators refused to allow his daughter admittance and the Neshoba County School Board refused admittance as well. He brought the issue of racism to the fore and urged his missionary network to petition Congress for creation of a Choctaw high school. The adverse publicity enraged the Baptist community, and cost Kaneubbe his job, forcing him to transfer to the Navajo reservation. Kaneubbe left but the problem of inadequate education remained for eastern Choctaw. Appeals to the BIA resulted in responses that students could attend out of state boarding schools, thus squarely putting pressure on the eastern Choctaw to relocate or face lack of educational opportunity. Agitation from the National Congress of American Indians, the Mississippi Federation of Women's Clubs, Oklahoma Choctaw Chief Belvin, and other civil rights activists forced Mississippi's congressional delegation to request a high school and dormitory for the Mississippi Band of Choctaw Indians, though it took several more years of negotiation to make the high school become a reality.

Belvin was acutely aware that his generation had been urged to learn English and not Choctaw, but claims that his father's encouragement to speak only English had caused Belvin to advocate for full assimilation and favor eliminating the study of Choctaw, are not born out by his work in education. Belvin remained involved with his alma mater, Southeastern State College (now Southeastern Oklahoma State University) in Durant. Around 1969, with Belvin and other educators' full support and input, the college began a Bilingual Education Program, which was sponsored by a grant from the United States Department of Health, Education, and Welfare National Institute of Education. The program targeted four elementary schools in the heart of Choctaw country, Battiest, Broken Bow, Smithville and Wright City in McCurtain County, Oklahoma. The program, as designed had 3 principal goals, all aimed at mainstreaming the student without sacrificing his/her native identity:

- Students should have positive image reinforcement both inside and outside of the classroom;
- Choctaw language must be accepted to be the basis for learning as the student develops a facility with English which will supplement learning;
- Teachers and classroom attendants must understand Choctaw language, thought patterns and behavior and accept those as equal to their English counterparts.

The program continued until around 1982, when federal funding initiatives were cut.

=== Indian Health ===
In 1955, the Indian Health Service was transferred from the administration of the BIA to the Public Health Service, which resulted in an almost immediate improvement in funding, training and services. At that time, the Talihina Indian Hospital (now known as the Choctaw Nation Health Care Center) was designated as the Public Health Service Indian Hospital and was the chief facility in Oklahoma providing comprehensive, preventative and other treatment services for the Choctaw. Belvin worked with Floyd Gale Anderson, the first full-blood Indian to hold the position of Service Unit Director, to expand the Choctaw health system. Under their tutelage, to make health care more accessible, satellite clinics were opened in Broken Bow, Hugo and McAlester.

Also during Belvin's term, in 1969. the Choctaw Nation created a Community Health Representative Program to help those Indians residing within the tribal service area of the Choctaw Nation boundaries to maintain health for their families. The program targets people who predominantly reside in rural settings and may not be near medical facilities and assists them with health checks, monitoring health issues, nutritional needs, education, and referral services.

=== Choctaw Nation Housing Authority ===
In the 1960s as part of the War on Poverty programs introduced by President Lyndon B. Johnson, Belvin submitted an application to the United States Department of Housing and Urban Development (HUD) to create a tribal housing authority. He realized that Federal programs administered by the Bureau of Indian Affairs were aimed primarily at reservation communities, and the unique status of Oklahoma tribes without extensive land bases, meant that many programs designed for Indians did not benefit the Five Civilized Tribes. He further had become aware that programs which the BIA had offered for loans, had evaporated with the enactment of the termination bill. HUD denied Belvin's application based on various reasons, but included that the Choctaw were not policing tribal lands. In 1966, he then resubmitted the application under the requirements for a state agency, rather than a tribal authority, and designated himself, as chief, with the powers vested in a mayor for the purposes of the Act. According to the state requirements, a 5-person board of commissioners was appointed to oversee the housing authority.

By 1971, 364 homes designed for low-income Indian families to purchase or rehabilitate housing and 116 units of low-rent housing had been finished, with an additional 274 homes under construction. By 1973, 885 houses had been completed and were occupied and an additional 331 were under construction.

== Tribal Election of 1971 ==
On 22 October 1970, the US Congress passed an Act (84 Stat. 1091) authorizing each of the Five Civilized Tribes to popularly elect their Principal Chief. The BIA selected an election committee of eight Choctaws to determine who would be eligible to vote in the first free election since the Dawes Act. The committee decided "to permit all lineal descendants of Choctaw by blood Dawes enrollees to vote," which resulted in about 25% of the ballots being from absentee voters. Though Belvin won the election, it would be his last term as chief. His efforts at rebuilding the tribal structure were seen as insignificant and not aggressive enough, his failure to define membership procedures to admit unenrolled descendants of enrolled members, and his lack of planning to develop the tribe led to his defeat in 1975.

== Offices, Recognition and Awards ==
- 1947-1953 State President of the Choctaw-Chickasaw Confederation
- 1948-1950 President of the board of trustees for the Goodland Academy & Indian Orphanage, Hugo, Oklahoma
- 1948 Chairman of Oklahoma Presbyterian Educational Campaign
- 1949-1975 member of the Inter-Tribal Council of the Five Civilized Tribes
- 1957 Outstanding Indian of Oklahoma, Tulsa Indian Democratic Club
- 1959 Outstanding American Indian by the Anadarko Indian Exposition.
- 6 October 1968 was proclaimed by the American Indian Institute of the University of Oklahoma as "Chief Belvin Day" in honor of his service to Indian Education
- 1968 - 1972 member Oklahoma City Indian Health Service Advisory Board
- 1968 - 1972 member Surgeon General's advisory board on Indian Health
- 1 June 1975 dedicated Harry J. W. Belvin Indian Health Center in Hugo, OK to honor the Chief
- 18 July 1975 honored by the Inter-Tribal Council of the Five Civilized Tribes as an Outstanding American Indian Citizen

== Personal life ==
On December 21, 1922, in Boswell, Oklahoma, Belvin married Lucille Brightwell. They had one child, Louise Belvin Frazier. Belvin was an elder in the Presbyterian Church.

He died 19 September 1986 in Bryan Memorial Hospital and was buried in Highland Cemetery, Durant, Oklahoma.

Political offices
Preceded by William A. Durant	Chief of the Choctaw Nation of Oklahoma; 1948–1975	Succeeded by David Gardner
