= Oklahoma State Banking Department =

- Great Seal of Oklahoma

Agency overview
- Formed: 1907; 119 years ago
- Headquarters: 2900 N Lincoln Boulevard; Oklahoma City, Oklahoma
- Employees: 43 unclassified
- Annual budget: $6.2 million
- Ministers responsible: Secretary of Finance and Revenue; Mick Thompson, Chair of Banking Board
- Agency executive: Mick Thompson, State Banking Commissioner

The Oklahoma State Banking Department (OSBD) is an agency of the state of Oklahoma. The Banking Department is responsible for regulating Oklahoma's banking system, including state-chartered banks, credit unions, savings and loan associations, and trust companies, as well as [(money transmitters)] and money order companies. The department also handles consumer complaints involving state-regulated financial institutions.

The Banking Department is led by a State Banking Commissioner who is appointed by the Governor of Oklahoma with the consent of the Oklahoma Senate to serve a four-year term. Assisting the commissioner is the State Banking Board, which consists of six members appointed by the governor and the commissioner as chair.

The current State Banking Commissioner is Mick Thompson, a former Oklahoma State Representative who has served in that position since September 1, 1992, when he was appointed by Governor David Walters. He has since been reappointed by Governors Frank Keating, Brad Henry and Mary Fallin in 1996, 2000, 2004, 2008 and 2012.

With the granting of statehood on November 11, 1907, Article XIV of the Oklahoma Constitution created the Banking Department. Governor Dewey F. Bartlett was chairman of the board, and Herbert H. Smock was the department's first banking commissioner.

== Organization ==
The department is under the supervision of the State Banking Board and its chairman, who is the State Banking Commissioner. The commissioner is appointed by the Governor of Oklahoma to serve a four-year term. The commissioner is assisted in managing the department by a deputy commissioner and two assistant commissioners.

- State Banking Board
  - Banking Commissioner
    - Deputy Banking Commissioner
      - Administration Division - responsible for managing the human resources and material resources of the Department
      - Banking Examination Division - responsible for inspecting all state-charted banks
        - Western Region
        - Eastern Region
      - Credit Union Examination Division - responsible for inspecting all state-charted credit unions
      - Legal Affairs Division - responsible for providing legal advice to the Department
      - Finance Division - responsible for overseeing all finance and budgetary issues of the Department
      - Information Technology Division - responsible for overseeing all information technology needs of the Department
  - Credit Union Board

== State Banking Board ==
The State Banking Board is the official regulatory body of all financial institutions in the State. The Board is composed of seven members: six appointed members and the State Banking Commissioner. The State Banking Commissioner serves as chairman of the board, but may only vote in case of a tie.

Of the six appointed members, five members must be active offices of a financial institution and a sixth member must be a citizen of Oklahoma, at least 35 years old, who has no experience as a bank officer or stockholder of a bank. All members of the board are appointed by the governor, by and with the advice and consent of the Oklahoma Senate, to serve a six-year term. However, the governor may only nominate individuals to fill the banking represent seats who have been nominated by the Oklahoma Bankers Association (OBA). Should the OBA fail to nominate a list of candidates within 30 days of a vacancy, the governor is free to select anyone who meets the qualifications of office. The governor is always free to nominate anyone to the non-bankers seat.

It is the duty of the State Banking Board to adopt reasonable and uniform rules and regulations to govern the conduct, operation and management of all financial institutions operating in the state. It is the duty of the State Banking Commissioner to enforce the rules adopted by the board.

== Budget ==
The Banking Department is not funded by yearly appropriations from the Oklahoma Legislature. Instead, it is funded entirely from fees generated from the financial institutions regulated by the department.

== Staffing ==
The State Banking Department, with an annual budget of over $6 million, is one of the smallest employers for the state. For fiscal year 2010, the department was authorized 43 full-time employees.

Division	Number of Employees
Administration Services	10
Examination Services	33
Total	43

== See also ==
- Oklahoma Office of State Finance
- Oklahoma Department of Consumer Credit
- Oklahoma Department of Securities
- Oklahoma Tax Commission
