= Henry G. Bennett Memorial Library =

Coordinates: 34°00′23″N 96°22′45″W

Henry G. Bennett Memorial Library is the primary academic library at Southeastern Oklahoma State University in Durant, Oklahoma. Construction began in 1927 and was completed in 1928 in Colonial Revival architecture, during Henry Garland Bennett's presidency, SOSU's sixth president. The collection at Bennett Library has over 183,000 volumes, 485,000 microforms, and 878 current periodical titles. It also has a selection of newspapers, sound recordings, videos, and software. Additionally, as a selective U. S. Government depository, the library has holdings of approximately 87,816 government documents and 6,077 Oklahoma documents.

== History ==
The library at Southeastern Normal School began in 1909. When the permanent building for the school was finished in 1910, the library was housed on the third floor. In 1911, a large shipment of books and materials was sent to the library. In 1915, the library was installed with lights, enabling students to study in the library at night. By 1917 the library had nearly one thousand children’s books, something that was not found in any other normal school in the state.

Plans for housing the library in a separate building began early in 1927. Construction began later that year and completed in 1928 during the presidency of Henry G. Bennett, at a cost of $US114,000. The library building featured four large Corinthian columns, a first floor magazine room and a second floor that could accommodate four hundred students. The third floor was for departmental libraries and contained several classrooms.

On the night of October 2, 1934, the library's north end caught fire. The fire was put out quickly by the Durant Fire Department and salvaged the building and many of the 30,000 books inside. The damage to the library was estimated at $50,000.

The library building was repaired and in the late 1930s the library was designated as a depository for federal government documents, and lamp posts were installed in front of the library. Through the 1930s and 1940s improvements were made to the library building, and in 1954, air conditioning was installed. Another important event of the 1950s was the addition of the 50,000th book in 1954.

For many years the library building housed the cafeteria in the basement, as well as the library and classrooms above. It was a closed-stack library with the stacks on the south side. During the mid-sixties, the building was completely renovated with an addition on the west. It has been an open-stack library since then.

As computer technology progressed in the 1960s, 1970s and 1980s, the library slowly began to implement computers in the library. By 1988, there were two databases for students on computer. The library services were automated in 1990 when the Data Research Association Library System was selected, which is an integrated on-line system providing circulation, public access catalog, cataloging, acquisitions, and serials components. The Ardmore Higher Education Center Library’s holdings are also included in the database. Further purchase of computer equipment and addition of more computer databases further increased the use of computers in the library. By 1997 there were thirteen computer for student use which enabled students to search several databases and use the Internet. The library began a web presence with introduction of its web page in 1997. In 1999 a computer lab was installed in the library with forty computers where students can do research, use library databases, write papers, or check their e-mail.

== Namesake ==
Henry G. Bennett served as the sixth president of Southeastern Oklahoma State University, from 1919 to 1928. After his presidency at SOSU, Bennett was nominated as president at Oklahoma A&M College and served from 1928 to 1950.

The library building was named the Henry G. Bennett Memorial Library in 1982 during homecoming festivities.
