= Southeastern Oklahoma State University =

University in Durant, Oklahoma, U.S.

- Former names: Southeastern State Normal School (1909–1921); Southeastern State Teachers College (1921–1939); Southeastern State College (1939–1974)
- Motto: Progress · Education
- Type: Public university
- Established: 1909; 117 years ago
- Parent institution: Regional University System of Oklahoma
- Academic affiliations: Space-grant
- President: David Whitlock
- Faculty: 225
- Students: 5,623 (2023)
- Location: Durant, Oklahoma, U.S. 34°00′23″N 96°22′41″W
- Campus: Small town, 269 acres (109 ha)
- Colors: Blue and gold
- Nicknames: Savage Storm, Campus of a Thousand Magnolias
- Sporting affiliations: NCAA Division II – GAC
- Mascots: Bolt, The Savage Storm Mascot
- Website: se.edu
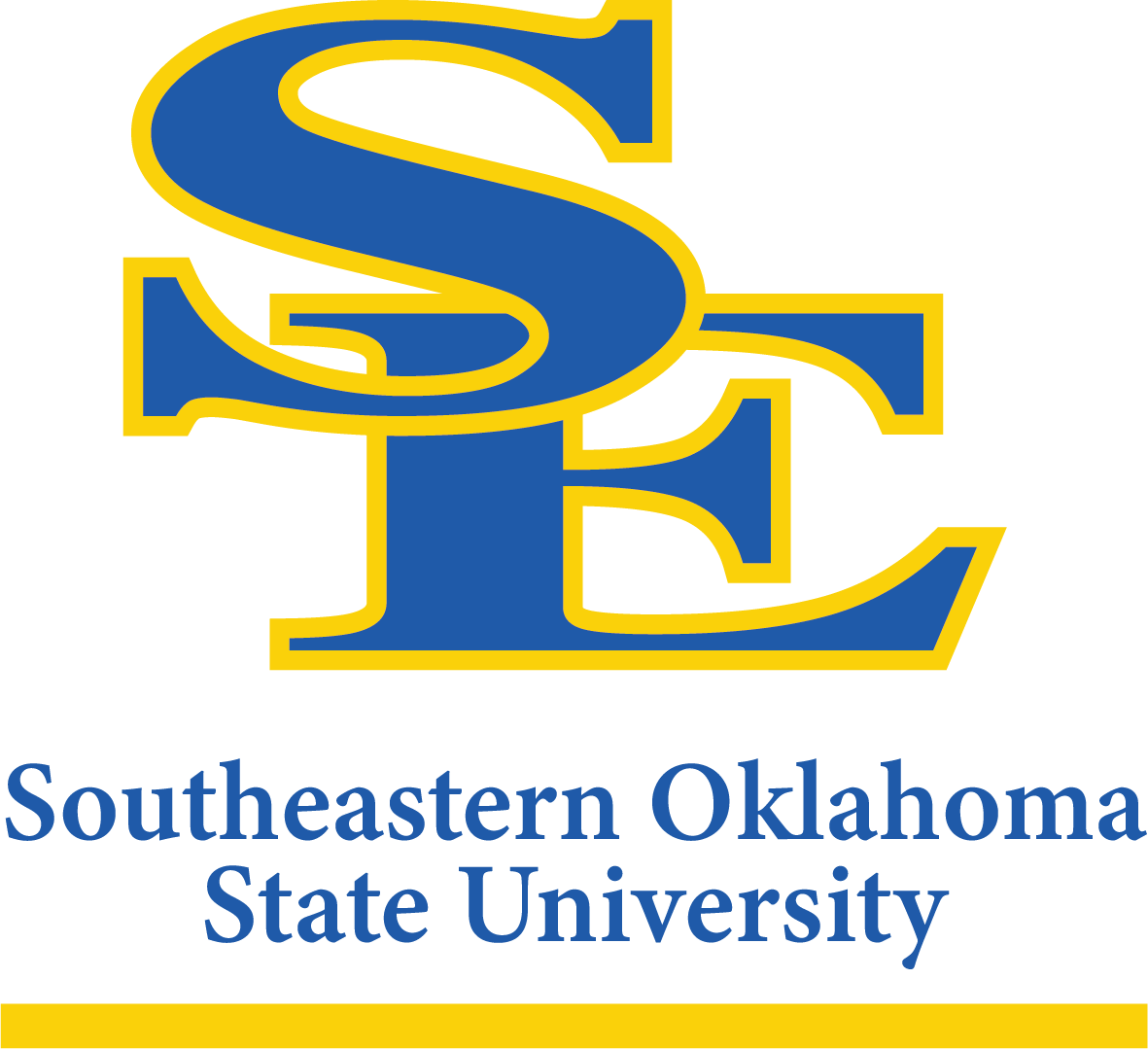

Southeastern Oklahoma State University (Southeastern or SE) is a public university in Durant, Oklahoma. Southeastern had a total enrollment of 6,012 in 2025.

== History ==
On March 6, 1909, the Second Oklahoma State Legislature approved an act designating Durant as the location for a normal school to serve the following 12-county region: Atoka, Bryan, Carter, Choctaw, Latimer, LeFlore, Love, Marshall, McCurtain, McIntosh, Pittsburg, and Pushmataha. Southeastern Oklahoma State University first opened its doors to students on June 14, 1909, as "Southeastern State Normal School". The early program of instruction consisted of four years of high school and the freshman and sophomore college years. The first sessions of the school were held in temporary quarters pending completion of Morrison Hall in January, 1911, long known as the Administration Building.

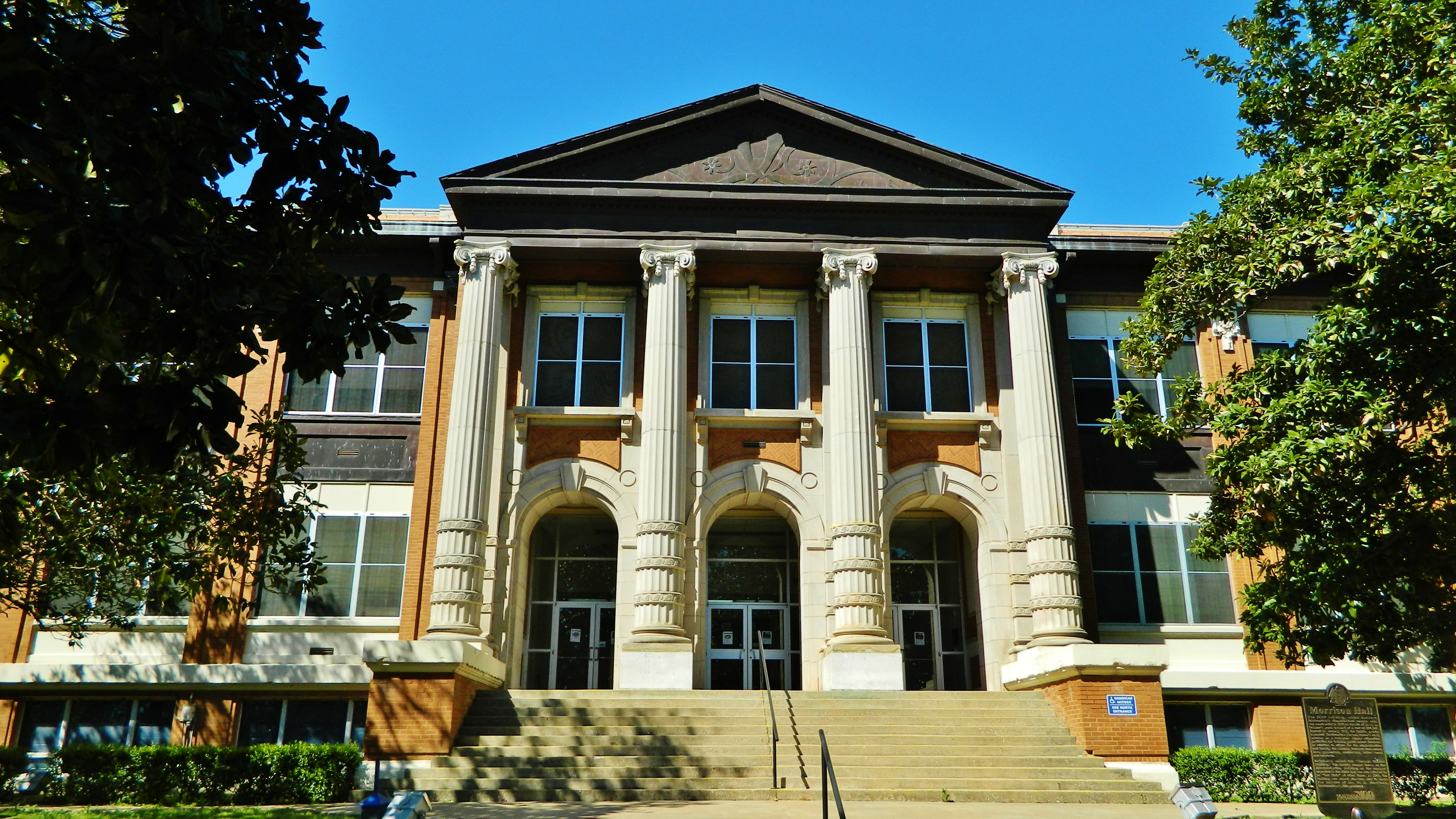
Morrison Hall

The original purpose of Southeastern was the education of teachers for the public schools of Oklahoma. The two-year graduates were awarded life teaching certificates. In 1921, the institution became a four-year college and was renamed "Southeastern State Teachers College". Construction on the college's library, now the Henry G. Bennett Memorial Library, was completed in 1928. The primary function remained that of teacher education and the degrees of Bachelor of Arts in Education and Bachelor of Science in Education were authorized.

The purpose of the college was expanded in 1939. Courses leading to two newly authorized non-education degrees - Bachelor of Arts and Bachelor of Science - were added. At this time, the college was renamed "Southeastern State College". In 1954, the curriculum was enlarged by the addition of a graduate program leading to the Master of Teaching degree. In 1969, the name of the degree was changed to Master of Education.

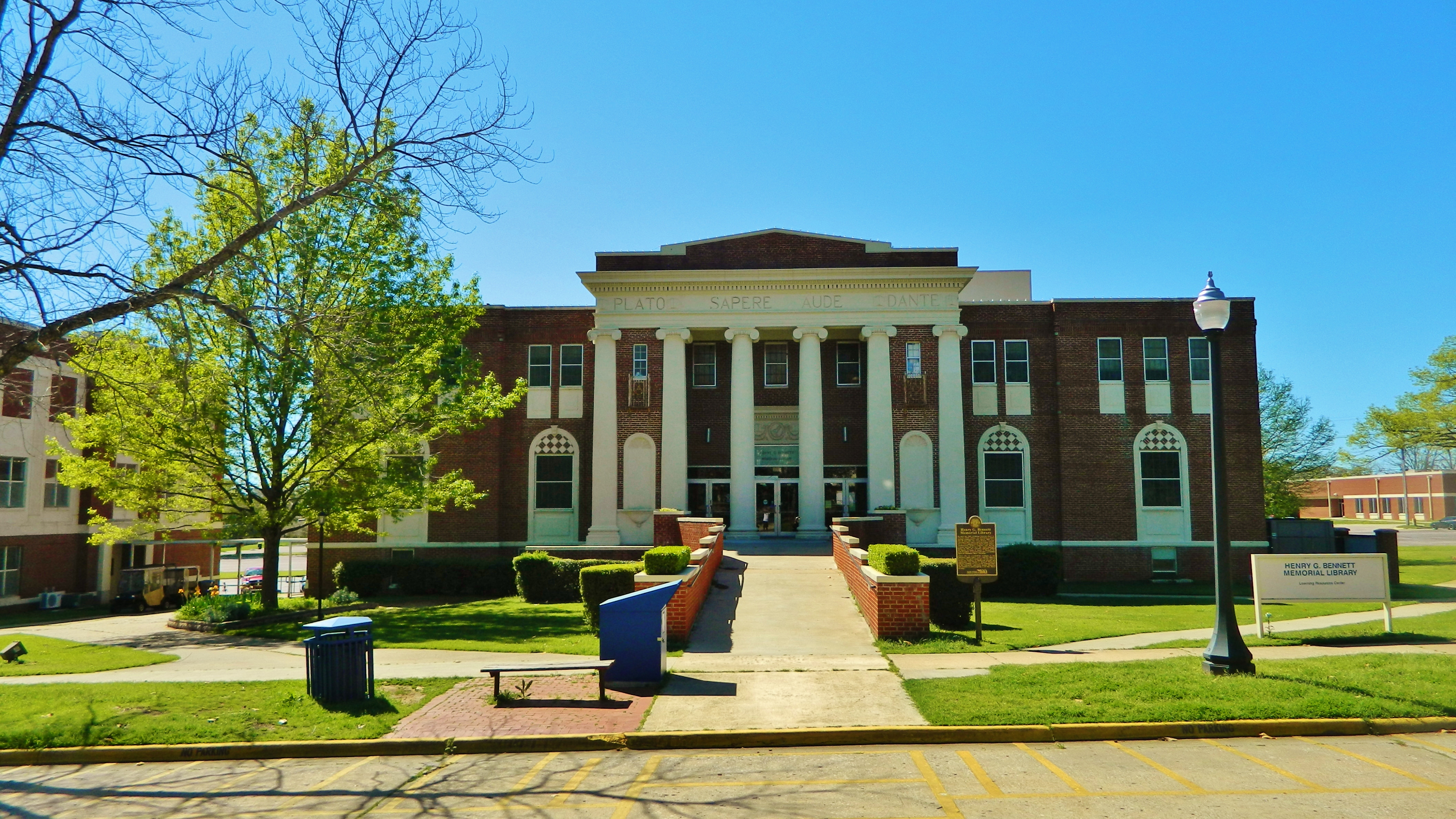
Bennett Memorial Library

On May 27, 1968, the Oklahoma State Regents for Higher Education designated Southeastern as an Area Community College. While retaining previous functions, the college moved in the direction of providing greater post-secondary educational opportunities by expanding its curriculum to include new programs in areas such as business, technology, aviation, and conservation.

In 1971, the Oklahoma State Regents for Higher Education requested that the state supported institutions of higher education review and evaluate their functions as members of the State System of Higher Education. Upon completion of the review, a comprehensive “Plan for the Seventies” was prepared by each institution and submitted to the Regents. On June 1, 1972, Southeastern submitted its plan to the Regents which was, subsequently, approved on March 29, 1973. The Master of Education degree was changed to the Master of Behavioral Studies and, subsequently, the university was approved to offer a graduate program in business which culminated in the degree of Master of Administrative Studies. Four options of the Master of Behavioral Studies degree were renamed Master of Education in August, 1979. The Master of Administrative Studies degree was revised and renamed Master of Business Administration in August, 1996.

On August 15, 1974, the name of Southeastern State College was changed to "Southeastern Oklahoma State University" by an act of the Oklahoma State Legislature. Since 1974, Southeastern, through institutional reorganizations, has continued to diversify, so that, presently, there are three academic schools: Arts and Sciences, Business, and Education and Behavioral Science.

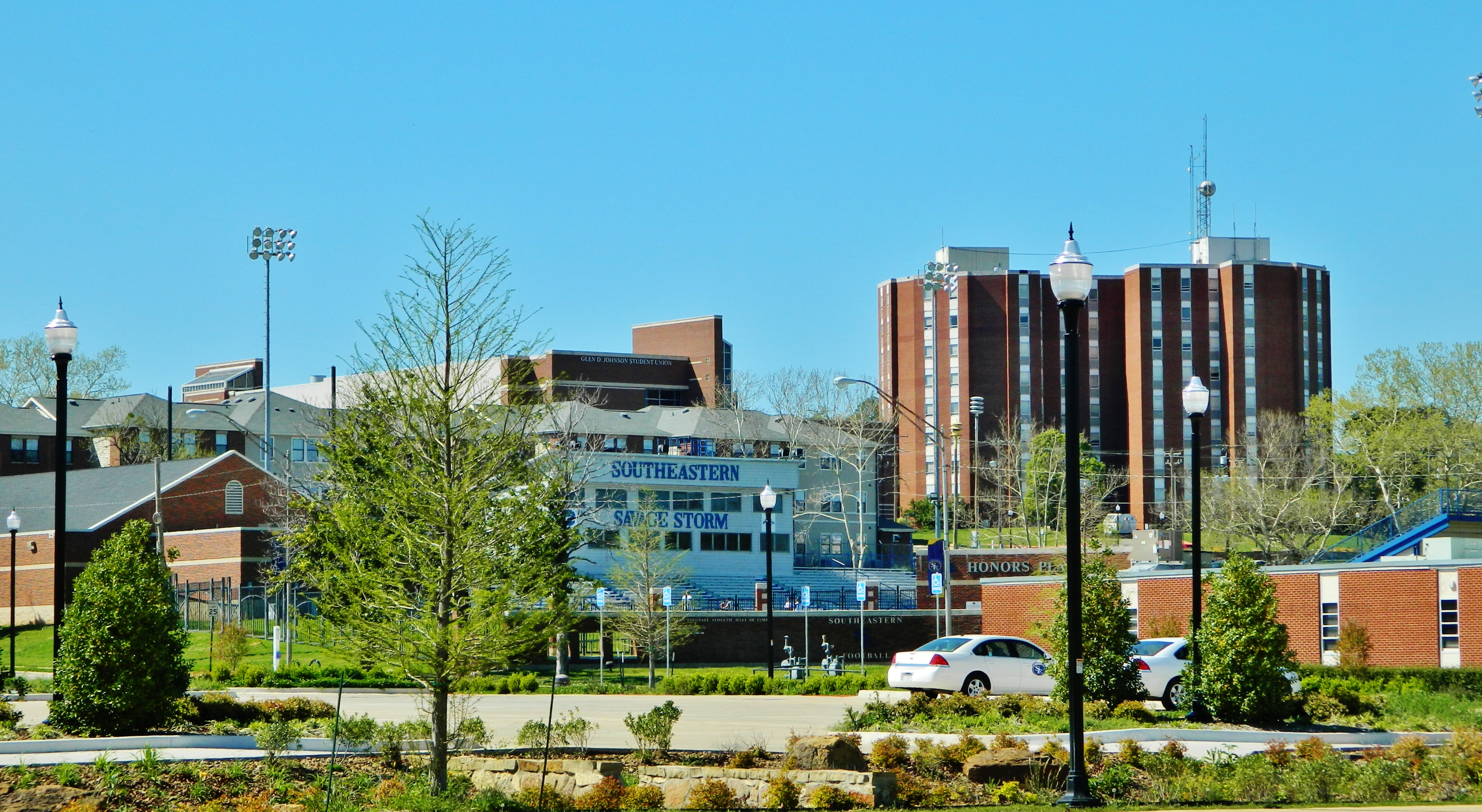
SOSU viewed from First Avenue

Southeastern has a zero tolerance policy regarding student conduct. Punishments occur for violations of campus regulations including punishments of alleged violations which cannot be appealed, as per the guidelines set by the Regional University System of Oklahoma. Controversy occurred after football player Justin Pitrucha was suspended following felony charges of possession of marijuana with intent to distribute within 2,000 feet of a school. However, instead of upholding the policy, Pitrucha was fully reinstated after the charge was later reduced to a misdemeanor.

After the 20-year tenure of president Leon Hibbs, Larry Williams served ten years as Southeastern's president. Glen D. Johnson served Southeastern for 9 years then in 2007 assumed the duties of Chancellor of the Oklahoma State System for Higher Education. Jesse Snowden succeeded Johnson as interim president. Michael Turner was selected as SE president in 2008 and inaugurated in January 2009. He announced his resignation June 2009 and regents named Larry Minks as interim then permanent president. Minks served as president through June 30, 2014, and Sean Burrage began duties as the 20th president on July 1, 2014. Burrage announced his resignation to take a vice president position at the University of Oklahoma in 2019 and in April 2020, Thomas Newsom began his duties as the 21st president. Newsom was named president of Pittsburg State University in September 2025. David Whitlock was named interim president of Southeastern in August 2026 and was named permanent president the following November.

=== Presidents ===
1. Marcus E. Moore, 1909–1911
2. Edmund Dandridge Murdaugh, 1911–1914
3. William C. Canterbury, 1914–1915
4. Andrew S. Faulkner, 1915–1916
5. T. D. Brooks, 1916–1919
6. Henry Garland Bennett, 1919–1928
7. Eugene S. Briggs, 1928–1933
8. Wade H. Schumate, 1933–1935
9. Kate Galt Zaneis, May 1935 to July 1937.
10. W. B. Morrison, Summer 1937
11. H. Vance Posey, 1937–1939
12. T. T. Montgomery, 1939–1952
13. Alan E. Shearer, 1952–1967
14. Elvin Leon Hibbs, 1969 to April 1987
15. Larry Williams, May 1987 to June 1997
16. Glen D. Johnson, Jr., July 1997 to December 2006
17. Jesse Snowden (interim), 2007
18. Michael Turner, January 2008 to June 2009
19. Larry Minks, 2009–2014
20. Sean Burrage, 2014– October 11, 2019
21. Bryon Clark (interim), October 12, 2019 – April 2020
22. Thomas W. Newsom, April 2020 – August 2025
23. David Whitlock, August 2025 to present

=== 2011 gender discrimination lawsuit ===
In April 2011, Rachel Tudor, an assistant professor of English, Humanities and Literature was denied tenure despite having been recommended for promotion and tenure twice in the prior two years by the Faculty Tenure and Promotion Committee, based on the university's criteria of teaching, scholarship and service. The committee, whose positive recommendations for tenure were routinely approved by the Administration, was overruled by Vice President of Academic Affairs Douglas McMillan, who had previously inquired of the university's Human Resources Department whether Tudor could be terminated because her lifestyle "offends his Baptist beliefs." Justifying the denial of tenure, McMillan has claimed that Tudor was unqualified, despite the original Tenure and Promotion Committee's findings, those of the Faculty Appeals Committee, and a resolution by the Faculty Senate in support of Tudor's application. Tudor, who had not worked at SE since May 2011, brought her case to the Oklahoma Human Rights Commission, the U.S. Department of Education, and the EEOC. On September 5, 2012, the EEOC issued a "Determination" that states Southeastern Oklahoma State University terminated Tudor's employment in violation of Title VII of the Civil Rights Act of 1964, as amended. The EEOC specifically cited sex discrimination, religious discrimination, and retaliation. Although Tudor welcomed the EEOC's conciliation offers, Southeastern rejected the EEOC's efforts, and the EEOC forwarded the case to the Department of Justice for consideration. On March 30, 2015, the Department of Justice filed a lawsuit against the university. The EEOC settled its suit with the university in August 2017. On November 20, 2017, a jury rendered a verdict of $1.165 million in favor of Tudor, finding that the university denied her tenure and the opportunity to reapply for tenure because of her gender, although it did not find the university created a hostile work environment.

=== 2013 NAACP protests ===
SE generated media attention in 2013 when the NAACP and Reverends Marshall Hatch and Ira Acree of the National Action Network spoke on behalf of five African-American college football students attending Southeastern, one of whom was from Chicago, regarding an incident which occurred on April 2, 2013. According to Durant Police, several people reported that masked men came to their residences and demanded money and cell phones. The students were suspended and scholarships revoked. All five were charged in June 2013 with felony conspiracy to engage in a pattern of criminal offenses plus misdemeanor charges of wearing a mask, hood or covering for the purposes of coercion, intimidation or harassment, and four counts of assault and battery.

During a preliminary hearing on October 16, 2013, all five men entered no-contest pleas to misdemeanor charges. The felony charges against them were dismissed as part of a plea agreement, and each was given three-year deferred sentences on the misdemeanor charges and also sentenced to 90 days in jail. Arlene Barnum of the NAACP contested their suspensions from SE under grounds of denial of the right to an attorney during disciplinary proceedings. Five members of the NAACP protested on the SE campus in May 2013 outside graduation ceremonies.

== Academics ==
In fall 2025, the university enrollment was 6,012 students in associate, bachelor's, master's, and doctoral degree programs as well as graduate certificate programs. The top five most popular majors for new undergraduate students in the fall of 2025 in order were Biology, Undecided, General Business, Elementary Education, and Health and Human Performance.

The aviation program is authorized by the FAA to allow students to complete the program in 1000 hours instead of 1500 hours.

The university is accredited by the Higher Learning Commission. Some programs are also accredited by specific accreditors:

- The Bachelor of Science Aviation Professional Pilot programs is accredited by the Aviation Accreditation Board International (AABI)
- The John Massey School of Business at Southeastern Oklahoma State University is accredited by the Association to Advance Collegiate Schools of Business (AACSB International).
- The Council for the Accreditation of Educator Preparation (CAEP) accredits the Teacher Education Programs at Southeastern Oklahoma State University.
- The school of music is accredited by the National Association of Schools of Music.

=== Graduate programs ===
Graduate programs are offered at Southeastern Oklahoma State University through the John Massey School of Business, the School of Arts and Sciences, and the School of Education and Behavioral Sciences. In the fall of 2025, the top three most popular graduate programs in order were the Master of Business Administration, Curriculum and Instruction Master of Education, School Counseling Masters in Counseling and Mental Health.

=== Additional facilities ===
SE has additional teaching facilities in the following location:

- McCurtain County branch campus (Idabel)
- Murray State College at Ardmore (Ardmore)
- Eastern Oklahoma State College (McAlester)
- Tinker Air Force Base and Rose State College (Midwest City)
- Grayson College (Denison and Van Alstyne, Texas)

=== Campus services ===
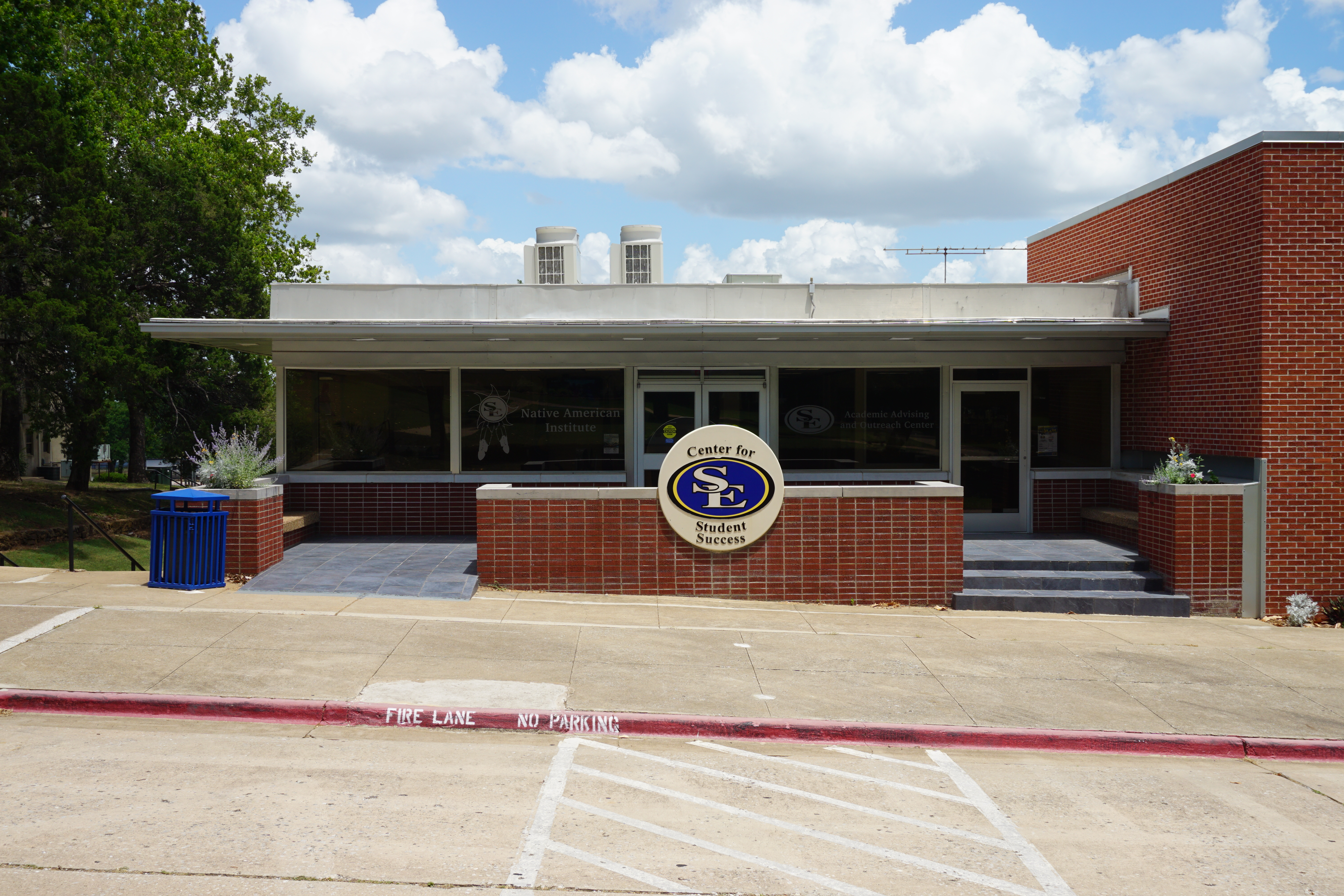
Center for Student Success

SE's campus services include: Student Support Services, Student Health Services, Academic Advising and Outreach Center, Learning Center, Wellness Center, Native American Institute, and Counseling Center.

== Campus safety ==
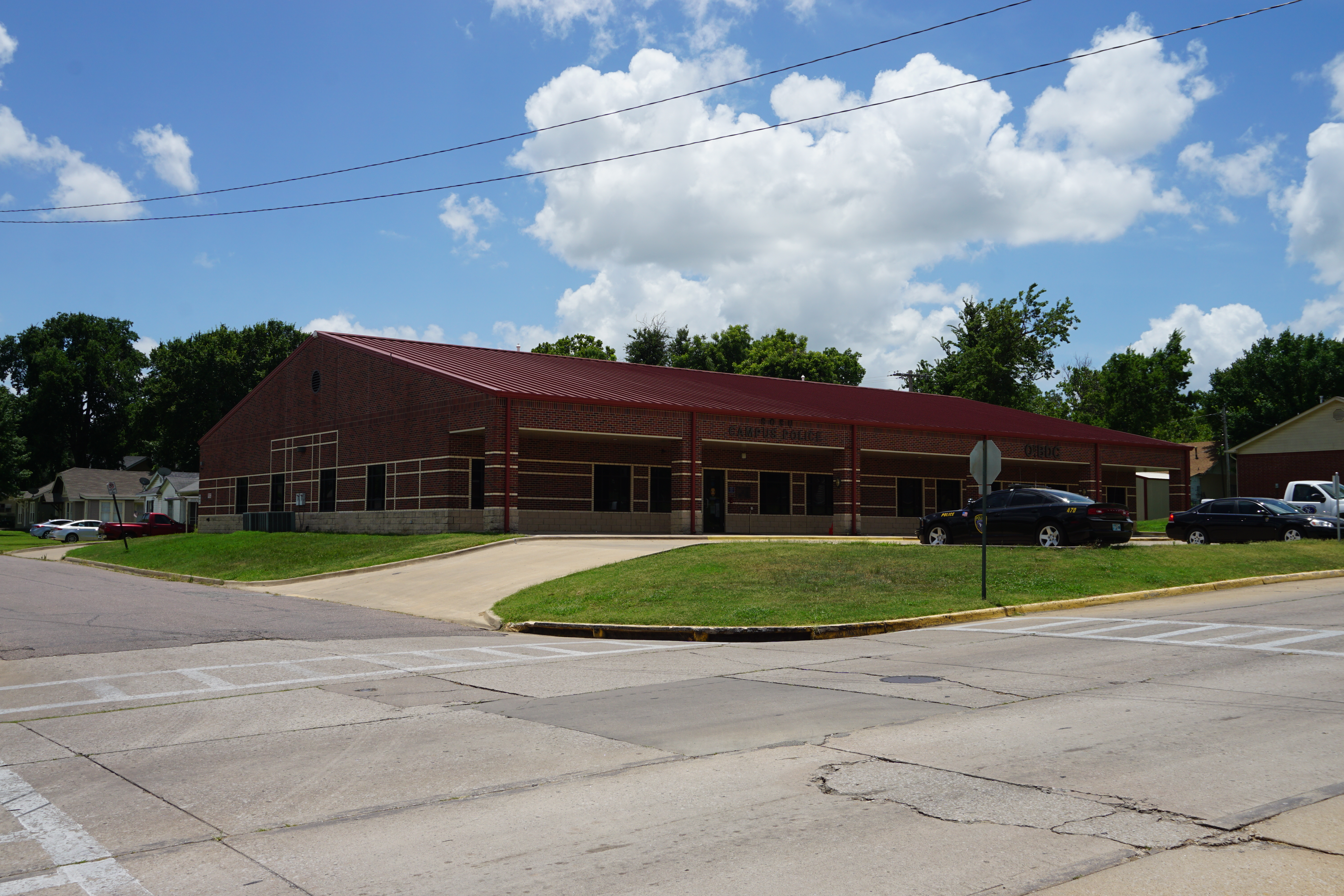
Campus Police building

This university's Campus Police Department operates 24/7 on campus along with emergency call boxes in various locations on campus, emergency alters such as disaster or weather, and its own phone line for direct calls to protect the students of the university.

== Organizations ==
The student body at Southeastern Oklahoma State University has the opportunity to become a part of over 90 student organizations active on campus.

=== Greek life ===
Southeastern currently has two fraternities and two sororities on campus.

Fraternities: Sigma Tau Gamma and Tau Kappa Epsilon

Sororities: Alpha Sigma Tau and Sigma Sigma Sigma

Southeastern also has honorary fraternities on campus. Kappa Kappa Psi, Alpha Eta Rho, Alpha Psi Omega, Beta Alpha Psi, Phi Alpha Theta, and Sigma Tau Delta.

== Athletics ==
SE is currently a member of the NCAA Division II Great American Conference. The Savage Storm participate in baseball, men's and women's basketball, football, men's and women's tennis, men's and women's golf, rodeo, women's cross country, softball, women's track & field and women's volleyball.

== Notable alumni ==
- Gary Batton, Chief of the Choctaw Nation of Oklahoma
- Tim Billings, college football coach
- Stanley Blair, professional football player
- Daren Brown, professional baseball coach
- Ferd Burket, professional football player
- Randall Burks, professional football player
- Michael Burrage, judge
- Brett Butler, professional baseball player
- Ira Clarence Eaker, Lt General US Army, US Army Air Force
- Johnnie Crutchfield, politician
- Joy Culbreath, professor and Choctaw Nation advisor
- Chuck Easttom, author, computer scientist, and inventor
- Jeff Frye, professional baseball player
- Raymond Gary, politician
- Gary Gray, professional baseball player
- Jay Paul Gumm, economic developer and politician
- Cecil Hankins, professional basketball player
- Jim Hess, college football coach
- Overton James (1956, 1965), Governor of the Chickasaw Nation 1963-1987
- Greg Legg, professional baseball player
- Scott Loucks, professional baseball player
- Chelcie Lynn, comedian
- Manoj Manchu, actor
- Ron May, politician
- Codey McElroy, professional football player
- Reba McEntire, country music singer and actress
- Hack Miller, professional baseball player
- Kirby Minter, professional basketball player
- Dennis Parker, college football coach
- Gregory E. Pyle, Chief of the Choctaw Nation of Oklahoma
- Dennis Rodman, professional basketball player
- Cody Reed, professional baseball player
- Crystal Robinson, professional basketball player
- Jerry Shipp, Olympic basketball player
- Pete Spratt, professional mixed martial arts fighter
- Rollie Stiles, professional baseball player
- Seoul City Sue, missionary, educator, and propaganda radio announcer
- Mick Thompson, banker and politician

== Notable faculty ==
- Henry G. Bennett, president of Southeastern Oklahoma State University
- Sean Burrage, politician, 20th president of Southeastern Oklahoma State University, and Oklahoma Chancellor of Higher Education
- Phyllis Fife, painter
- Glen D. Johnson, Jr., president of Southeastern Oklahoma State University
- David W. Whitlock, 15th president of Oklahoma Baptist University and 22nd President of Southeastern Oklahoma State University
