= Oklahoma Department of Securities =

- Great Seal of the State of Oklahoma

Agency overview
- Formed: July 1959
- Headquarters: 204 N. Robinson Ave, Suite 400, Oklahoma City, Oklahoma 73102
- Ministers responsible: Vacant, Secretary of Licensing and Regulation; Michael C. Mordy, Chair of Commission
- Agency executives: Melanie Hall, Administrator; Vacant, Deputy Administrator; Gerri Kavanaugh, General Counsel; Phillip Carey, Director of Operations
- Parent agency: Oklahoma Securities Commission
- Website: www.securities.ok.gov

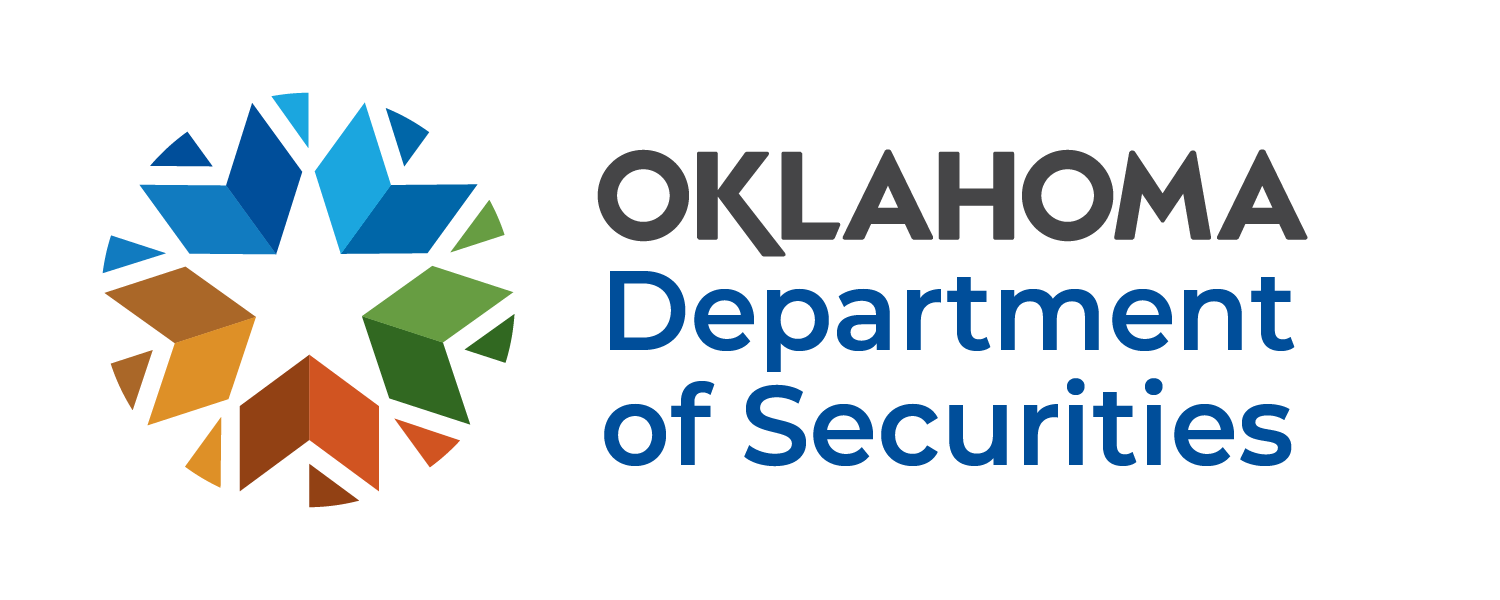
Oklahoma Department of Securities

The Oklahoma Department of Securities (ODS) is a government agency of the State of Oklahoma responsible for regulating the securities industry within the state. The department licenses and oversees broker-dealers, investment advisers, and their representatives; registers securities offerings; investigates potential violations of securities laws; and provides investor education to help protect the public from fraud.

The department operates under the direction of the Oklahoma Securities Commission, which appoints the Administrator of Securities and adopts rules to enforce Oklahoma’s securities laws.

The agency was established in 1959 during the administration of Governor J. Howard Edmondson.

== Responsibilities ==
The Department is charged with administering and enforcing the Oklahoma Uniform Securities Act of 2004. Its core responsibilities include:

- Registering securities offered or sold in Oklahoma
- Licensing broker-dealers, agents, investment advisers, and representatives
- Investigating complaints and suspected fraud
- Enforcing compliance through administrative and legal action
- Promoting investor education and financial literacy

== Early Securities Regulation in Oklahoma ==
Prior to the establishment of the Oklahoma Department of Securities in 1959, the regulation of securities in the state was managed under earlier statutes and temporary commissions. Oversight authority often fell to panels composed of existing state officials, including the State Banking Commissioner, the Secretary of State, and the State Auditor.

These commissions operated under changing legal frameworks and were frequently reorganized, reflecting the ad hoc nature of securities oversight during the early 20th century. By the 1950s, the complexity of securities markets and increasing investor fraud prompted the Oklahoma Legislature to establish a dedicated regulatory agency.

=== Timeline of Early Regulation ===
- 1920s–1930s: Securities oversight assigned to a multi-member commission including the Bank Commissioner, State Auditor, and Secretary of State.
- 1940s–1950s: Continued regulation through temporary statutes and informal enforcement under other financial regulatory bodies.
- 1959: Department of Securities established as a standalone agency under new legislation.

=== Pre-1959 Commission Officials ===
Pre-1959 Oklahoma Securities Commissioners

Name	Title/Role	Term start	Term end
O.B. Mothersead	Bank Commissioner	1924	1927
Joe H. Strain	Bank Commissioner	1923	1923
C.C. Childers	State Auditor	1923	1926
R.A. Sneed	Secretary of State	1923	1926
Roy Walcott	Bank Commissioner	1922	1923
Fred G. Dennis	Bank Commissioner	1920	1922
Joe S. Morris	Secretary of State	1920	1922
Frank C. Carter	State Auditor	1920	1922
Lewis Terry	Unknown	1920	1926

== Organization ==
The Oklahoma Department of Securities is structured as follows:

- Securities Commission
  - Administrator
    - Deputy Administrator
      - Professional Registrations and Compliance Division – Manages licensing and regulatory compliance for securities professionals.
      - Corporate Finance Division – Handles registration of securities offerings and reviews related filings.
      - Investigations and Enforcement Division – Investigates complaints and enforces compliance with securities laws.
      - Investor Education Division – Educates the public on financial safety and fraud prevention.

== Securities Commission ==
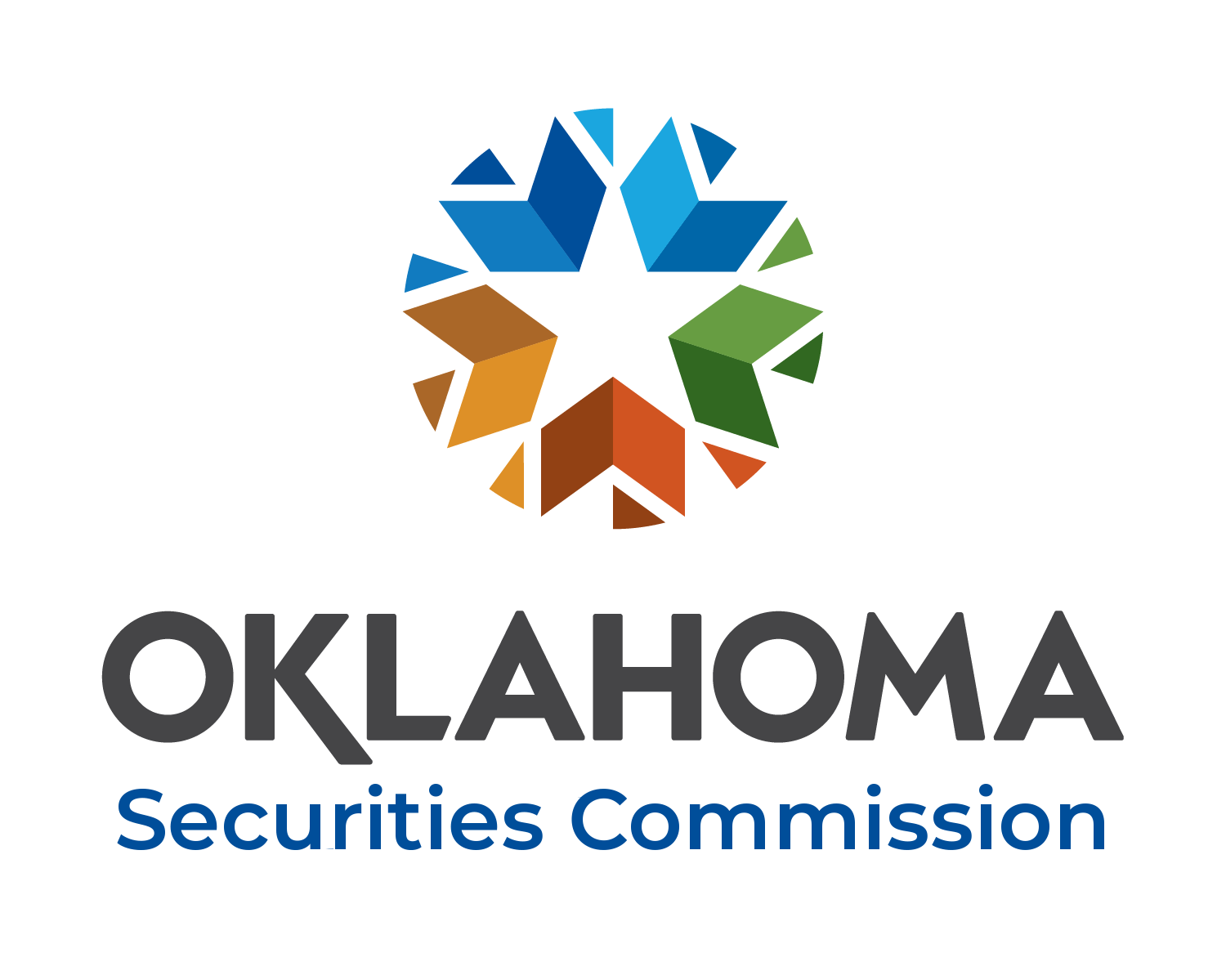
Oklahoma Securities Commission

The Securities Commission is the governing body of the department and consists of five members:

- One member must be a licensed attorney
- One must be a certified public accountant
- One must be an officer of a bank or trust company
- One must be a member of the securities industry
- The Oklahoma State Banking Commissioner serves as the fifth voting member

Commissioners are appointed by the Governor of Oklahoma with the advice and consent of the Oklahoma Senate and serve staggered six-year terms.

The Commission adopts administrative rules, establishes policy, and appoints the Administrator of Securities, who manages daily operations of the department.

== Current and Former Administrators ==
Since its establishment in 1959, the Oklahoma Department of Securities has been led by a series of Administrators appointed by the Commission. These individuals have overseen the enforcement of state securities laws and investor protection efforts.

Administrators of the Oklahoma Department of Securities

Name	Title	Term start	Term end
Hollis Hampton	Interim Administrator	August 1959	October 1959
Hugh F. Owens	Administrator	October 1959	March 1964
Carl G. Engling	Administrator	June 1964	October 1968
Wm. G. Fisher	Administrator	February 1969	January 1971
Patrick C. Ryan	Administrator	February 1971	November 1971
Wm. G. Fisher	Administrator	December 1971	November 1974
John M. McNerney	Acting Administrator	November 1974	September 1975
Bruce W. Day	Administrator	September 1975	August 1978
Frank E. Marley Sr.	Administrator	August 1978	January 1983
P. David Newsome	Administrator	May 1983	June 1984
C. Raymond Patton Jr.	Administrator	July 1984	June 1986
Susan E. Bryant	Administrator	June 1986	March 1991
Irving L. Faught	Administrator	April 1991	August 2019
Melanie B. Hall	Administrator	October 2019	Present

== Current and Former Commission Members ==
Since its creation, the Oklahoma Securities Commission has been composed of members appointed by the Governor and confirmed by the Senate, representing legal, financial, accounting, and securities expertise.

Commission Members of the Oklahoma Securities Commission

Name	Term start	Term end
Stuart J. Sander	July 2025	July 2031
David T. Stanley	July 2024	July 2030
Michael C. Mordy	July 2023	July 2029
Randa Vernon	July 2021	July 2027
Robert M. Neville	July 2019	July 2025
David F. Aboud	October 2017	July 2023
P. David Newsome Jr.	July 2017	July 2023
Nancy K. Hyde	July 2015	July 2021
Thompson S. Phillips	July 2017	April 2018
William O. Johnstone	May 2003	July 2013
Armand Paliotta	September 2005	July 2011
Wesley D. Brantley Jr.	April 2003	July 2009
John A. Shelley	May 2001	May 2003
Steven T. Ledgerwood	May 2000	July 2005
Don Criswell	May 1998	July 2003
J. Philip Patterson	June 1994	March 2000
Charles E. Newton	October 1993	July 2017
Mick Thompson	October 1992	Present
Hank Bradley	September 1992	January 2001
Gail Miles-Harrison	July 1991	July 1997
Paul S. Lovoi	June 1991	July 1997
John Massey	June 1990	September 1992
Douglas L. Jackson	April 1988	May 1994
Wayne Osborn	March 1987	August 1992
Lonnie L. Farmer	April 1985	April 1990
William H. Crawford	August 1983	January 1984
Robert Y. Empie	September 1979	May 1987
William C. McGrew	September 1979	May 1986
Don Van Horn	December 1978	September 1979
Joe B. McMillin Jr.	August 1975	May 1987
Harry E. Leonard	November 1973	October 1978
Walter Gene Moffitt	May 1973	July 1979
James M. Wilson	January 1972	July 1983
John D. Williams	August 1969	July 1975
Earl B. Mitchell Jr.	August 1969	July 1975
Herbert F. Hewett	February 1966	July 1969
J. Robert Meek	July 1965	May 1971
John L. Goode	November 1963	January 1966
Carl B. Sebring	July 1959	June 1969
Arthur M. Foster	July 1959	June 1965
Charles E. McCune	July 1959	November 1972
Paul C. Duncan	July 1959	October 1963

== Budget ==
The Department of Securities is not funded by annual appropriations from the Oklahoma Legislature. Instead, it operates entirely on licensing and registration fees collected from the regulated industry.

== See also ==
- Oklahoma State Banking Department
- Oklahoma Office of Management and Enterprise Services
- North American Securities Administrators Association
