= St. Pat's for All =

Annual parade in Queens, New York

St. Pat's for All Parade
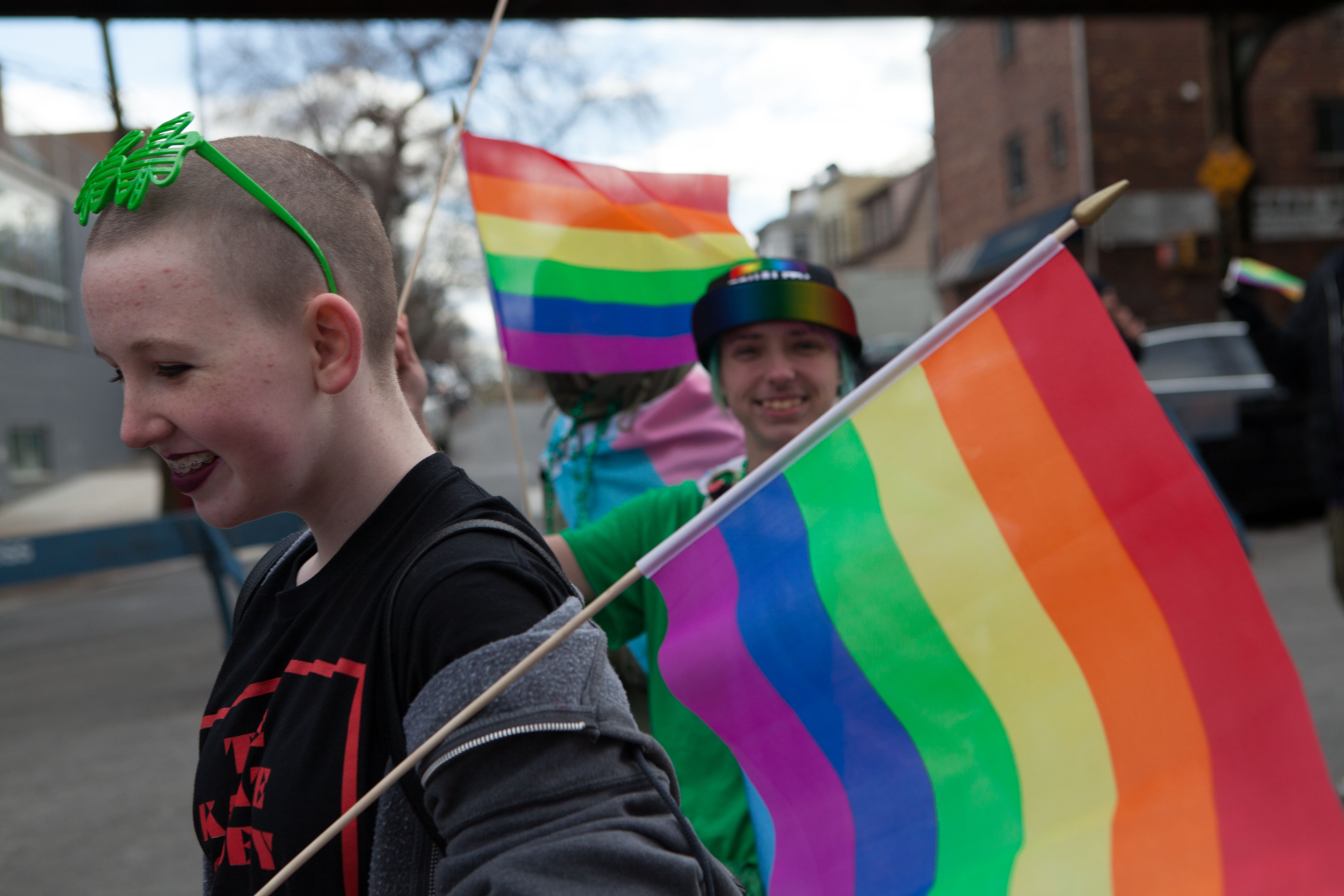
- A participant in the St. Pat's for All Parade
- Status: Active
- Genre: Parade
- Date: First Sunday in March
- Frequency: Annual
- Venue: Skillman Avenue
- Locations: Sunnyside, New York and Woodside, New York
- Country: United States
- Inaugurated: March 5, 2000
- Founder: Brendan Fay
- Website: stpatsforall.org

The St. Pat's for All Parade is an annual Saint Patrick's Day parade held in Sunnyside and Woodside in Queens, New York City, United States. Processing along Skillman Avenue, it honors Irish culture while explicitly welcoming LGBTQ participants and contingents from other immigrant and ethnic communities. It was first held on March 5, 2000, and was initiated by Brendan Fay, a gay Irish immigrant, in response to the exclusion of LGBTQ groups such as the Irish Lesbian and Gay Organization from the New York City St. Patrick's Day Parade in Manhattan. The parade's motto, "Cherishing All the Children of the Nation Equally," is taken from the Proclamation of the Irish Republic issued during the Easter Rising of 1916.

The parade has been held annually in early March since its founding, with the 2021 parade held virtually rather than in person because of the COVID-19 pandemic; the 27th annual parade took place on March 1, 2026. By its second decade the once-"insurgent" protest event had grown in size and gained mainstream acceptance, drawing diverse ethnic contingents, pipe bands, and politicians. In 2016 Fay and co-chair Kathleen Walsh D'Arcy received the Presidential Distinguished Service Award for the Irish Abroad from Irish President Michael D. Higgins for their work with the parade and the Lavender and Green Alliance.

== Background ==
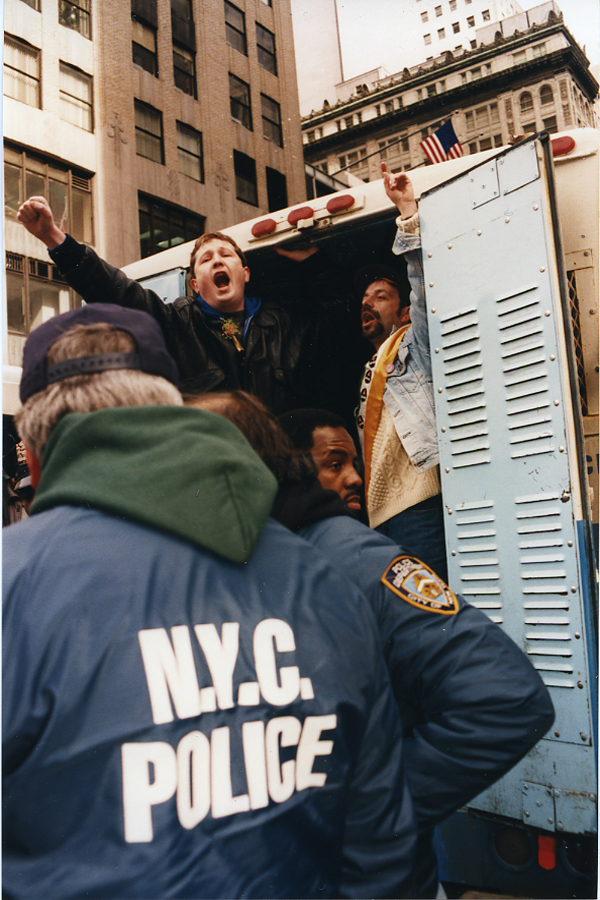
Brendan Fay and Turloch McNallis arrested while protesting the exclusion of LGBTQ groups from the New York City St. Patrick's Day Parade

The New York City St. Patrick's Day Parade in Manhattan, organized since 1851 by the Ancient Order of Hibernians (AOH), became the focus of a long-running civil-rights dispute beginning in 1990, when the Irish Lesbian and Gay Organization (ILGO) (Note: ILGO was formed in 1988, its founding indirectly prompted by Fay, who had posted a notice calling for an Irish gay and lesbian group on the Oscar Wilde Memorial Bookshop's bulletin board in Manhattan.) sought permission to march under its own banner. AOH denied the request; under pressure from Mayor David Dinkins, a compromise allowed ILGO to march in 1991 alongside an AOH chapter without a banner, but spectators heckled the group and threw beer cans, after which AOH formally banned ILGO from future parades.

Through the 1990s, courts upheld AOH's right to exclude LGBTQ contingents, most consequentially in the 1995 unanimous U.S. Supreme Court ruling in Hurley v. Irish-American Gay, Lesbian, and Bisexual Group of Boston, which affirmed that parade organizers held a First Amendment right to exclude marchers as a form of expressive speech. In subsequent years, the AOH publicly framed the Manhattan parade as a more strictly Catholic ritual than in earlier decades; one AOH division president told an interviewer, "The New York parade has a lot of decorum. That whole thing with the homosexuals? You know we're not going to take any nonsense whatsoever. It's not a political thing, it's a religious thing." Dinkins boycotted the Manhattan parade in 1992 and 1993, breaking a tradition of mayoral attendance dating to 1923, and the exclusion led to recurring civil-disobedience protests, including arrests of LGBTQ marchers and elected officials over the following decades. In 1994, Fay broke from ILGO and founded the Lavender and Green Alliance as a forum for Irish-American LGBTQ cultural expression (Gaelic language, music, and dance) as well as parade-inclusion advocacy.

The Manhattan parade gradually opened to LGBTQ marchers under sustained pressure that included de Blasio's mayoral boycott and a 2014 sponsorship withdrawal by Guinness. In September 2014, organizers announced that OUT@NBCUniversal would become the first LGBT group permitted to march under its own banner in the 2015 parade. One year later, the parade committee voted to admit Lavender and Green for the 2016 parade, which Fay called crossing "a historic threshold." On March 17, 2016, Lavender and Green marched up Fifth Avenue for the first time, ending the formal ban; de Blasio returned to the Manhattan parade after his two-year boycott, and Fay told reporters, "This is unbelievable." Fay and members of the alliance continued to march in the Manhattan parade in subsequent years, including in 2019.

== History ==
=== Founding (2000) ===
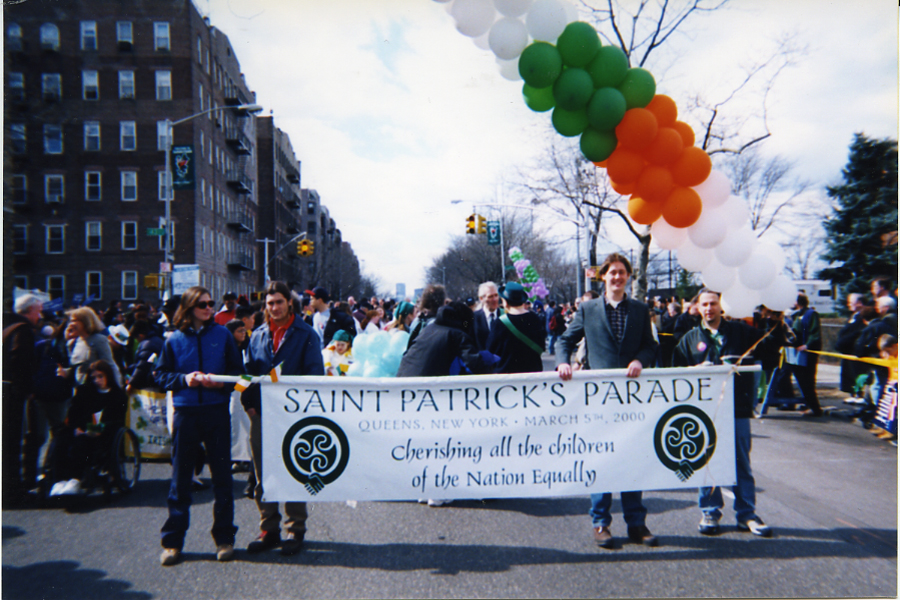
Participants prepare to march in the first St. Pat's for All Parade in 2000

In 2000, Fay founded St. Pat's for All as an inclusive alternative to the Manhattan St. Patrick's Day Parade. Alongside Ellen Duncan, he served as a co-chair of the inaugural event, held on Sunday, March 5; co-organizers included Daniel Dromm, the founder of the Queens Pride Parade. The parade adopted as its motto the phrase "Cherishing All the Children of the Nation Equally," from the 1916 Proclamation of the Irish Republic. (Note: The Proclamation was largely written by Patrick Pearse, and committed an independent Irish Republic to "religious and civil liberty, equal rights and equal opportunities to all its citizens, and...cherishing all the children of the nation equally." Parade organizers have cited the line as a foundational text supporting LGBTQ and immigrant inclusion.) Organizers framed the event as both an Irish-heritage parade and an inclusive civic celebration, open to LGBTQ marchers and to participants of all ethnicities and cultures.

During the inaugural parade, Chief Dark Cloud of the Choctaw Nation of Oklahoma performed a blessing acknowledging Native-Irish ties and the Choctaw aid sent during the Great Famine. (Note: In 1847, members of the Choctaw Nation, themselves displaced by the Trail of Tears, donated $170 (worth several thousand dollars in modern terms) to Irish famine relief efforts. The gift has been commemorated by the Kindred Spirits sculpture in County Cork.) The parade has also observed a moment of silence for Robert Rygor, an early advocate for LGBTQ inclusion in the Manhattan parade who died of AIDS-related causes in 1994. Newsday reported that more than 70 social, community, and educational organizations marched, four of them gay and lesbian groups, and that thousands lined the 20-block route along Skillman Avenue. Contingents included Korean marchers honoring the Irish nuns who had taught them, Chilean folk musicians honoring Bernardo O'Higgins, the Irish-descended founder of Chile; the Irish Lesbian and Gay Organization, Lavender and Green Alliance, SAGE, Queens Lesbian and Gay Pride Committee, Dignity/New York, and PFLAG's Queens chapter; the Irish Arts Center and the Emerald Isle Immigration Center; the Sunnyside Drum Corps; and Father Mychal F. Judge of St. Francis of Assisi Church in Manhattan. Then-First Lady and U.S. Senate candidate Hillary Rodham Clinton, in her first street appearance in Queens as an official candidate, marched seven blocks of the route and pushed the wheelchair of 16-year-old disability-rights advocate Anastasia Somoza, later a 2017 grand marshal, up Skillman Avenue. Council Member Dromm, a co-organizer, said Clinton's attendance "brought a lot of legitimacy to this parade."

Local reception of the inaugural parade was mixed. The Sunnyside Chamber of Commerce and a Woodside block association publicly disassociated themselves from the event, and a Catholic church along the route refused to let participating children use its restrooms. Two organized opposition groups, "Concerned Friends of Woodside" and the "Morality Action Committee," distributed fliers before the parade describing the event as evil and as an "insult to God and Catholics," though only a small number of protestors materialized along the route. Counter-protesters held religious-themed signs reading "Sacrilege," "Sacrilegious," "Blasphemy," and "Sodomites"; a Yonkers accountant briefly attempted to block the route by kneeling in prayer before being moved aside by police, and a Sunnyside resident heckled Clinton with shouts of "Go back to Arkansas, carpetbagger!" Newsday columnist Dennis Duggan described the event as "the first Irish parade in New York to include gays and lesbians marching under their own banner."

Fay served as the parade's principal organizer for 22 years, working alongside longtime co-leader Kathleen Walsh D'Arcy, and stepped down in November 2021. The parade has subsequently been organized by Walsh D'Arcy and other co-chairs. In December 2016, Fay and Walsh D'Arcy were among the recipients of the Presidential Distinguished Service Award for the Irish Abroad, presented by Irish President Michael D. Higgins at Áras an Uachtaráin in recognition of their work with the Lavender and Green Alliance and St. Pat's for All.

=== Growth and reception (2001–2019) ===
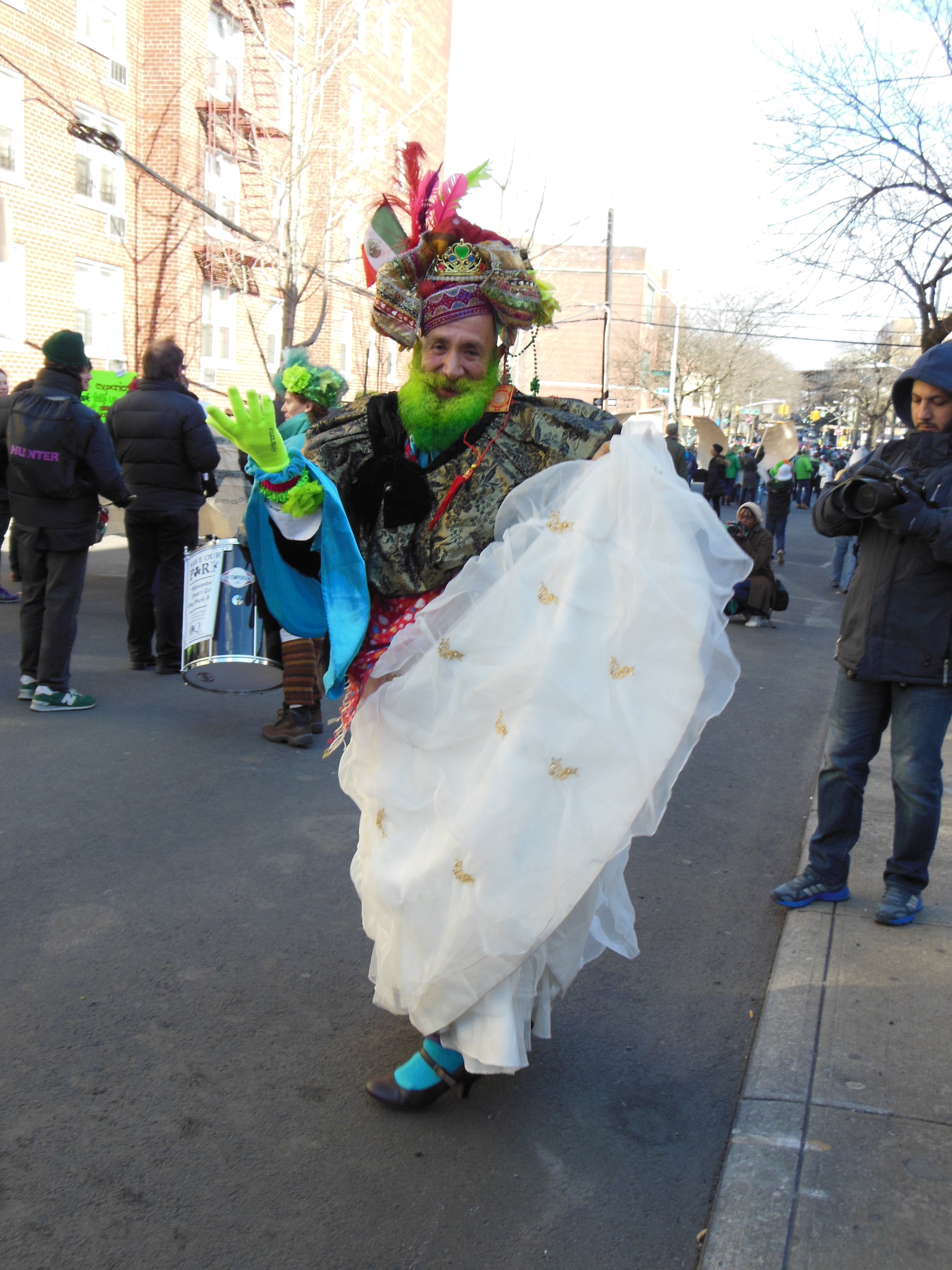
Ms. Colombia at St. Pat's for All in 2013

Coverage of the second annual parade, which proceeded on March 4, 2001, detailed continuing opposition. Organizers received an answering-machine threat consisting of the sound of a gun firing, and posters were hung only days before the event for fear of being torn down. After a branch of Catholic Charities in Woodside withdrew an earlier offer to host marchers, no Queens Catholic parish or school agreed to participate, and organizers were unable to recruit a Catholic priest to give the opening blessing. Two Republican Party leaders in Woodside, Patrick Hurley and Ed Coyne, publicly condemned the parade as an "extremist gay and lesbian exhibition hopelessly and ignobly disguised as a celebration of Irish culture." Organizers framed the event as "a diverse parade, not a gay parade." The event drew Public Advocate Mark Green and Comptroller Alan Hevesi, both Democratic candidates in the 2001 mayoral race; Mayor Rudolph Giuliani continued his tradition of marching only in the Staten Island parade. The 2002 parade was dedicated to the memory of Father Mychal Judge, the FDNY chaplain who was the first identified casualty of the September 11 attacks and who had marched in the inaugural 2000 parade in his Franciscan habit; Fay later said of Judge, "When few clergy were willing to walk with us or stand with us, he walked with us in his Franciscan habit."

By 2005 the parade was drawing several hundred marchers and continuing to attract elected officials including Council Member Eric Gioia, Assemblyman Michael Gianaris, and New Paltz mayor Jason West, a national figure for officiating same-sex marriages outside legal authorization in early 2004. By Mulligan's 2007 account, the parade had doubled in size compared to the previous year. Bloomberg and Quinn both marched in the 14th annual parade in 2013, with IrishCentral describing the event as "one of the most diverse in the city, embracing LGBT contingents, community groups, children's bands, Irish organizations and religious and civic groups." By 2013, when The New York Times covered the parade's expected 2,000-plus marchers and the addition of the FDNY Emerald Society Pipes and Drums (a band Fay had previously been unable to recruit), Fay told the paper, "We're now part of the St. Patrick's Day tradition in New York."

The 2018 parade, marking the event's 19th year, was framed by organizers around several commemorative themes: the centenary of women's suffrage in Ireland, the 20th anniversary of the Good Friday Agreement, and the 50th anniversary of the Catonsville Nine Vietnam War draft protest, alongside support for DACA recipients then under threat in U.S. immigration policy.

=== Pandemic and post-pandemic (2020–2023) ===
The 2021 parade was held virtually for the first time in its history due to the COVID-19 pandemic, with messages of support from Council Member Daniel Dromm, Irish Consul-General Ciaran Madden, and U.S. Representative Alexandria Ocasio-Cortez; the program was dedicated to the late activist Tarlach MacNiallais and featured musical performances by Mick Moloney, David Amram, and Malachy McCourt, along with a filmed message from young people in Drogheda inspired by the poetry of Seamus Heaney. The 2022 parade, held on March 6 and honoring MacNiallais, marked the return of in-person marching after the pandemic; Lieutenant Governor Brian Benjamin, U.S. Senator Chuck Schumer, and U.S. Representative Carolyn Maloney marched.

=== 25th anniversary and political turn (2024–present) ===
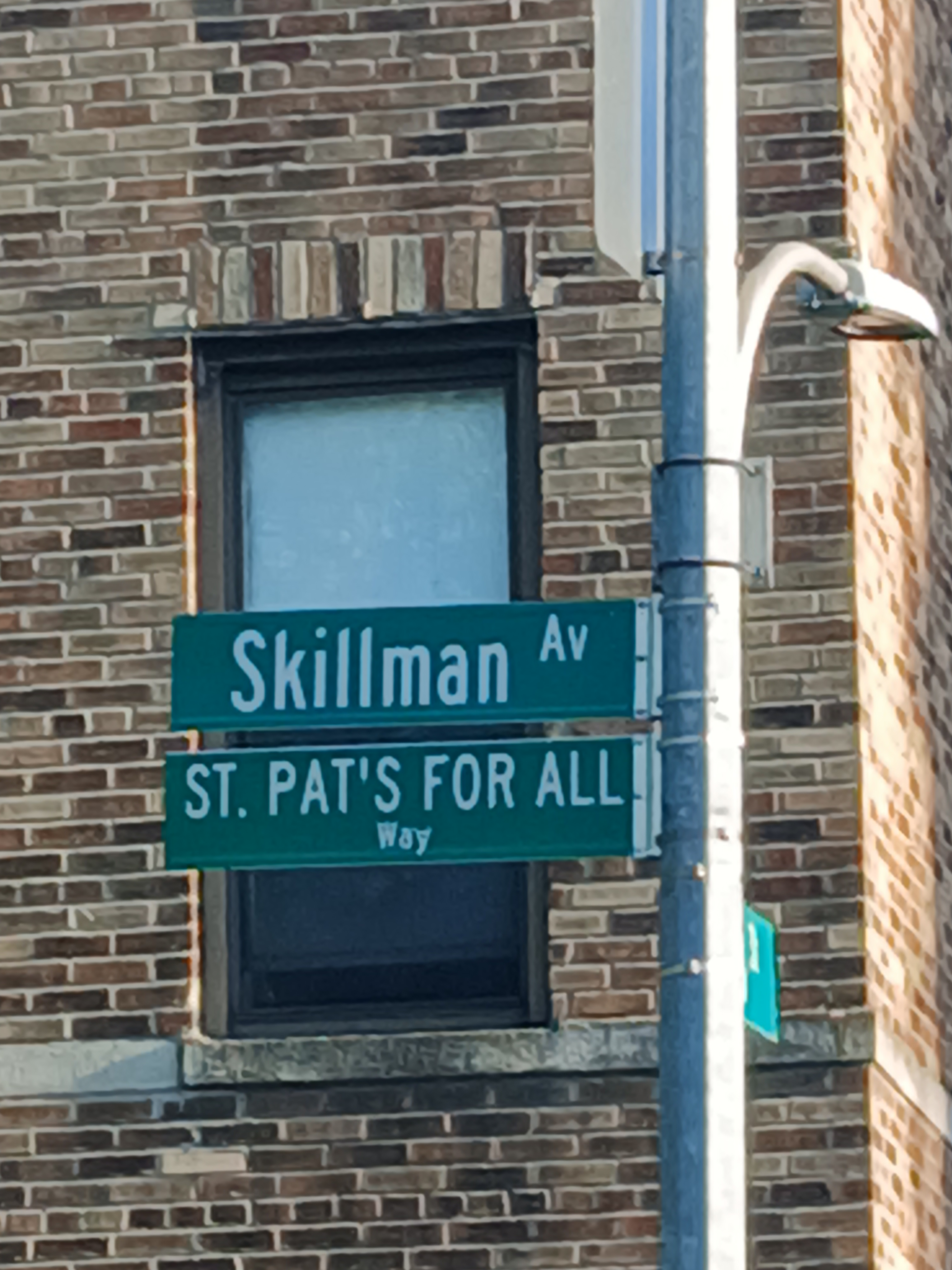
Co-named street sign for "St. Pat's for All Way" at Skillman Avenue and 43rd Street, designated in 2024.

The 25th annual parade, on March 3, 2024, drew a large gathering of state and city elected officials, including U.S. Representative Alexandria Ocasio-Cortez, Attorney General Letitia James, Queens Borough President Donovan Richards, Irish Consul-General Helena Nolan, and Irish Senator Jerry Buttimer, and was the occasion of the "St. Pat's for All Way" street co-naming at Skillman Avenue and 43rd Street. The 2025 parade, the 26th, fielded a record number of more than 110 marching contingents. The 2026 parade, on March 1, brought roughly 1,000 marchers across more than 100 contingents and was attended by Attorney General James, Borough Presidents Richards and Antonio Reynoso of Brooklyn, State Senator Michael Gianaris, and Council Members Julie Won, Shekar Krishnan, and Linda Lee; it was dedicated as a tribute to writer-actor Malachy McCourt (1931–2024), a longtime parade supporter and 2006 co-grand marshal.

== Parade route ==
The parade is held annually on a Sunday in early March and processes along Skillman Avenue in Queens, from 43rd Street in Sunnyside to roughly 58th Street in Woodside. Both neighborhoods have historic ties to Irish New York; organizers selected the Sunnyside-to-Woodside route in part for the area's high concentration of foreign-born residents, well above the city average. On March 3, 2024, the intersection of Skillman Avenue and 43rd Street, where the parade's reviewing stage is erected each year, was co-named "St. Pat's for All Way" to mark the parade's 25th anniversary, in a ceremony attended by Council Member Won, Council Speaker Adrienne Adams, and Consul-General Nolan.

== Contingents ==
The parade has incorporated cultural contingents that draw on Irish-diaspora connections beyond the United States. Mexican marchers have paid tribute to the San Patricio Battalion, the Irish-led unit that fought for Mexico in the Mexican–American War. The parade has also recognized other Irish-born figures from the histories of Latin America, among them Thomas Charles Wright, a founder of Ecuador's navy, and William Brown, the first commander of Argentina's navy. Its program has further commemorated the abolitionist Frederick Douglass, who took inspiration from the Irish campaign for Catholic emancipation, and the Irish-born labor organizer Mother Jones. By 2003, Fay estimated that roughly ten percent of marchers were gay, with the parade by then drawing a broad cross-section of Irish-American and immigrant Queens. By 2013, contingents had also come to include Pakistani, Bengali, Bolivian, Korean, and Chinese groups, alongside a Turkish delegation marching in tribute to Ottoman food shipments to Ireland during the Famine. Other recurring contingents have included neighborhood youth groups, Korean drummers, and an Afro-Celt musical group named De Jimbe. A recurring children's contingent, the Keltic Dreamers, comprises African-American and Latino schoolchildren from the Bronx who perform Irish music and dance.

== Political dimensions ==
The parade has consistently attracted New York elected officials, particularly those who have boycotted or criticized the Manhattan St. Patrick's Day Parade over its historical exclusion of LGBTQ contingents. Mayor Michael Bloomberg, newly elected, marched in 2002, becoming the first sitting mayor to participate in St. Pat's for All; the Daily News quoted him as saying, "I didn't break any tradition, I just was elected mayor. So this was maybe the start of a tradition." In 2003, Bloomberg returned in steady rain alongside Council Speaker Gifford Miller, Comptroller William C. Thompson Jr., Council Members Christine Quinn and Eric Gioia, and State Senator Thomas Duane; Bloomberg told the crowd, "I'm glad everybody can come and march in this parade -- I wish all parades were that way." (Note: Other sources report Bloomberg's quote as "I'm glad everyone's here marching. I wish all parades could be that way.") Fay welcomed the mayor's appearance but called on him not to march in the Manhattan parade unless its organizers first invited "prominent Irish lesbian and gay New Yorkers" to join him. Quinn continued marching after becoming Council Speaker in 2006; in 2007 she attended both St. Pat's for All and the Dublin St. Patrick's Festival as an openly gay invited guest of the Dublin City Council, while again boycotting the Manhattan parade.

In 2014, newly elected Mayor Bill de Blasio boycotted the Manhattan parade and attended St. Pat's for All, calling it "what New York City is all about." That year, members of the Gay Officers Action League, the NYPD's LGBTQ officers' association, marched in uniform in St. Pat's for All while Police Commissioner William Bratton marched in the Manhattan parade, breaking publicly with de Blasio's boycott. de Blasio became a recurring participant, marching through a snowstorm in 2015 alongside grand marshal Kerry Kennedy after again boycotting the Manhattan parade, which that year permitted only one LGBT-themed contingent. de Blasio said the Manhattan parade's concession that year to allow one gay group to fly its flag was "too small a change to merit a lot of us participating." Kennedy's grand-marshal remarks described her visit to Uganda, where lawmakers had proposed life imprisonment and the death penalty as punishment for homosexuality. New York City Council Speaker Melissa Mark-Viverit and a number of other local elected officials also marched in the parade that year.

In the mid-2020s, the parade also became a venue for protests over U.S. and global political developments. The 2024 parade featured calls for a ceasefire in the Gaza war, with U.S. Representative Alexandria Ocasio-Cortez addressing the crowd on the issue. The 2025 parade was framed by organizers and described in press coverage as a response to the early policies of the second Donald Trump administration on diversity programs and transgender rights, and featured contingents from Saoirse Palestine NY and the newly formed New York Irish for Palestine, alongside Drag Story Hour NYC and the Queer Big Apple Corps.

== Grand marshals ==
The parade has named one or more grand marshals nearly every year, typically Irish, Irish-American, or LGBTQ-rights figures of cultural, political, religious, or activist prominence. According to the parade's official records and contemporaneous press coverage, recent grand marshals have included:

Year	Grand marshal(s)	Notable affiliation
2006	Frank, Malachy, Michael, and Alphie McCourt (the four McCourt brothers)	Writers
2010	Sister Mary Lanning and Daniel Dromm	Activist; Council Member
2011	Patricia Lewsley and James P. Cullen	Northern Ireland politician; U.S. Army veteran
2013	Pauline Turley and Aidan Connolly	Irish Arts Center
2014	Thomas Duane and Terry McGovern	Former State Senator; human-rights lawyer
2015	Brian F. O'Byrne and Kerry Kennedy	Irish actor; lawyer
2016	Colum McCann and Loretta Brennan Glucksman	Irish writer; American Ireland Fund chair
2017	Phil Donahue and Anastasia Somoza	Broadcaster; disability-rights advocate (had marched in inaugural 2000 parade)
2018	Kathleen Sullivan and Dan Barry	Nuclear-disarmament activist; The New York Times writer
2019	Sean Curran and Fionnula Flanagan	Dancer-choreographer; Irish actress
2020	Mick Moloney	Irish musician and folklorist
2022	Tarlach MacNiallais (posthumous)	Irish-born LGBTQ-rights and disability-rights activist
2023	Cáit O'Riordan and Paul Muldoon	Musician; poet
2024	Dennis Brownlee and Geraldine Hughes	African American Irish Diaspora Network founder; actress
2025	Judy Collins and Micky Murray	Singer-songwriter; Lord Mayor of Belfast
2026	Kate Mulgrew; Charlotte Moore and Ciarán O'Reilly	Actress; Irish Repertory Theatre co-founders

== See also ==
- New York City St. Patrick's Day Parade
- Hurley v. Irish-American Gay, Lesbian, and Bisexual Group of Boston

== Sources ==
- Mulligan, Adrian N. (2008). "Countering Exclusion: The 'St. Pats for All' Parade". Gender, Place and Culture: A Journal of Feminist Geography. 15 (2): 153–167. doi:10.1080/09663690701863265.
- Mulligan, Adrian N. (2007). "Parading Possibility: 'St. Pat's for All' and the Re-Imagining of Irishness". Which Direction Ireland?: Proceedings of the 2006 ACIS Mid-Atlantic Regional Conference. Cambridge Scholars.
- Maguire, Anne (2006). Rock the Sham! The Irish Lesbian & Gay Organization's Battle to March in New York City's St. Patrick's Day Parade. Street Level Press. ISBN 978-0-9729296-3-9.
- Kilgannon, Corey (March 1, 2013). "Insurgent St. Patrick's Day Parade Comes Into Its Own". City Room. The New York Times.
