= Runa (band) =

Celtic music group

- Origin: Newtown, PA
- Genres: Celtic, folk,
- Years active: 2009–present
- Members: Shannon Lambert-Ryan, Fionán de Barra, Dave Curley, Maggie Estes White, Cheryl Prashker
- Website: www.runamusic.com

Runa is a Celtic music group. They combine the traditional music of Ireland and Scotland with modern music such as folk and jazz. The band members are based in Philadelphia, Nashville, and Chicago - they come from Ireland, USA and Canada. Their influences include Mary Black, The Chieftains, U2, Solas, Karan Casey, Loreena McKennitt, Wolfstone, Nickel Creek, Sarah McLachlan, Enya, Moya Brennan, Kate Rusby, Dervish, Gerry O'Beirne, Clannad, Natalie MacMaster, and Amos Lee.

== History ==
The band includes two husband and wife duos: vocalist Shannon Lambert-Ryan and guitarist Fionan de Barra; and Zach and Maggie White. The band celebrated their tenth anniversary in 2019. In 2020 they worked on a project inspired by the Native American gift to Ireland during the Irish Famine.

== Members ==
- Shannon Lambert-Ryan: vocals, step-dancing, bodhrán
- Fionán de Barra: guitar, vocals, bodhrán
- Caleb Edwards: mandolin, vocals
- Jake James: fiddle, step dancing
- Cheryl Prashker: percussion

== Discography ==
- Jealousy (2009)
- Stretched on your Grave (2011)
- Somewhere along the Road (2012)
- Current Affairs (2014)
- Ten: The Errant Night (2019)
- The Tide of Winter (2020)
- When the Light Gets In (2024)

== Awards and honours ==
- They have won several awards in the Montgomery-Bucks Music Awards in 2009 and 2010, including Best Folk Band, Best Album and Best Female Vocalist.
- Irish Music Awards 2012: Top Group & Top Traditional Group
- 12th Annual Independent Music Awards: Best Traditional/World Song ("Amhrán Mhuighinse")
- 14th Annual Independent Music Awards: Best Traditional/World Song ("The False Knight Upon the Road")
