= Eternal Heart (sculpture) =

Outdoor sculpture in Tuskahoma, Oklahoma

Eternal Heart is a large stainless steel outdoor sculpture unveiled in Tuskahoma, Oklahoma, August 2024. It is a companion piece to the 2017 Kindred Spirits, located in Bailick Park in Midleton, County Cork, Ireland. Both sculptures honor the story of Choctaw-Irish relations.

The Eternal Heart sculpture stands at the Choctaw Nation of Oklahoma's capitol in Tuskahoma. Photo courtesy of the Choctaw Nation

Created by Choctaw artist Samuel Stitt, Eternal Heart commemorates the 1847 donation by the Choctaw people to Irish famine relief during the Great Famine, despite the Choctaw themselves living in hardship and poverty, having recently endured the Trail of Tears. The original donation totaled $170 USD, which has been estimated at $5000 in today's U.S. dollars.

The 8-foot-tall steel structure combines a Celtic trinity knot (triquetra) intertwined with a heart and is specifically placed facing toward Ireland. The concrete base is edged with diamond shapes, a Choctaw symbol of reverence to the diamondback rattlesnake. The sculpture sits atop a mound, honoring the moundbuilder heritage of the Choctaw ancestors as well as the ancient “hill forts” and mounds found in Ireland.

Eternal Heart was a joint commission, funded by the Government of Ireland and the Chahta Foundation. It is part of ongoing nation-to-nation relationship building between the Choctaw Nation of Oklahoma and Ireland, in addition to a sister city agreement between McAlester, Oklahoma and Midleton, Ireland, and a sponsored scholarship program for Choctaw Nation citizens through University College Cork.
