= Queens Pride Parade =

LGBTQ event in New York City

The Queens Pride Parade and Multicultural Festival
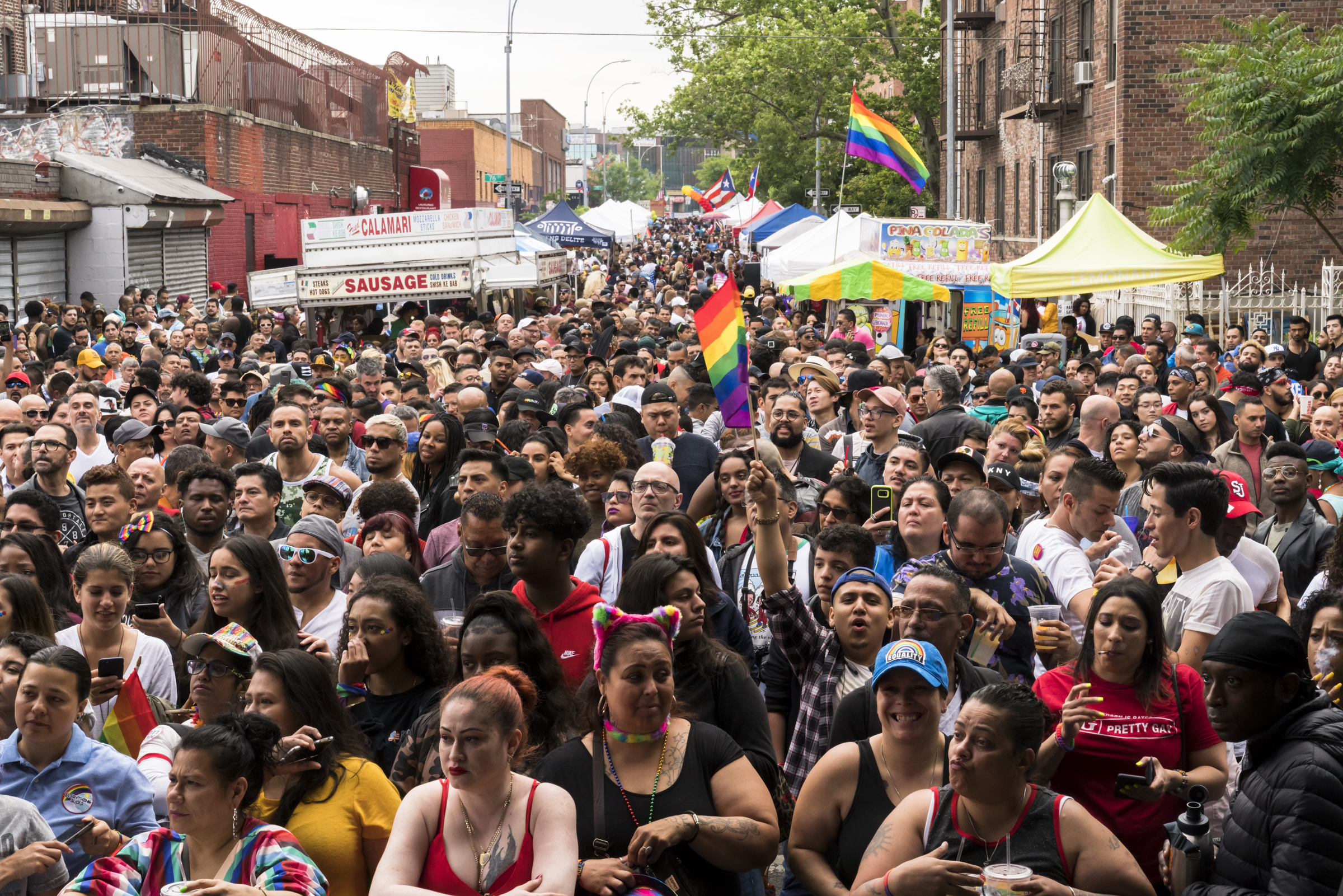
- Frequency: Annually every first Sunday in June
- Locations: Jackson Heights, Queens, New York City. Parade on 37th Avenue from 89th Street to 75th Street; festival at 75th Street and 37th Road
- Country: USA
- Years active: 43
- Inaugurated: June 6, 1993
- Founder: Daniel Dromm and Maritza Martinez
- Most recent: June 2, 2019
- Organiser: Queens Lesbian & Gay Pride Committee

The Queens Pride Parade and Multicultural Festival is the second oldest and second-largest pride parade in New York City. It is held annually in the neighborhood of Jackson Heights, located in the New York City borough of Queens. The parade was founded by Daniel Dromm and Maritza Martinez to raise the visibility of the LGBTQ community in Queens and memorialize Jackson Heights resident Julio Rivera. Queens also serves as the largest transgender hub in the Western Hemisphere and is the most ethnically diverse urban area in the world.

== History ==
The controversy over Children of the Rainbow, along with the murder of Julio Rivera, was Queens's Stonewall.

— New York City Councilman Daniel Dromm

Two events spurred the LGTBQ community of Jackson Heights to host its annual pride march: the first was a hate crime; the second, the rejection of a multicultural curriculum by Queens Community School District 24. On July 2, 1990, Julio Rivera, a 29-year old gay Puerto Rican bartender, was murdered in the schoolyard of P.S. 69 in Jackson Heights. After a night of heavy drinking, three young white men (Erik Brown, Esat Bici, and Daniel Doyle) who were out hunting for "a drug dealer or a drug addict or a homo out cruising", lured Rivera into the schoolyard and punched, clubbed, hammered, and finally stabbed him to death. In response to his murder, Rivera's relatives and friends mobilized New York City's lesbian, gay, bisexual and transgender community, holding a candlelight vigil at the site of the murder and putting pressure on the police department to find his killers.

In 1992, Queens Community School District 24 rejected the Multicultural Children of the Rainbow Curriculum proposed by Chancellor Joseph A. Fernandez of the New York City public school system. Children of the Rainbow was designed to teach children acceptance of New York City's diverse communities, but the president of District 24's board, Mary A. Cummins, called the guide "dangerously misleading lesbian/homosexual propaganda", using three among the hundreds of the recommended readings, Heather Has Two Mommies, Daddy's Roommate, and Gloria Goes to Gay Pride, as proof. In response, Daniel Dromm, a public school teacher in District 24 Community proposed a family-friendly celebratory parade that would allow the Queens LGBTQ community to become visible. As he explained six years later, "I wanted people to know that lesbians and gay men were their family, friends, and neighbors."

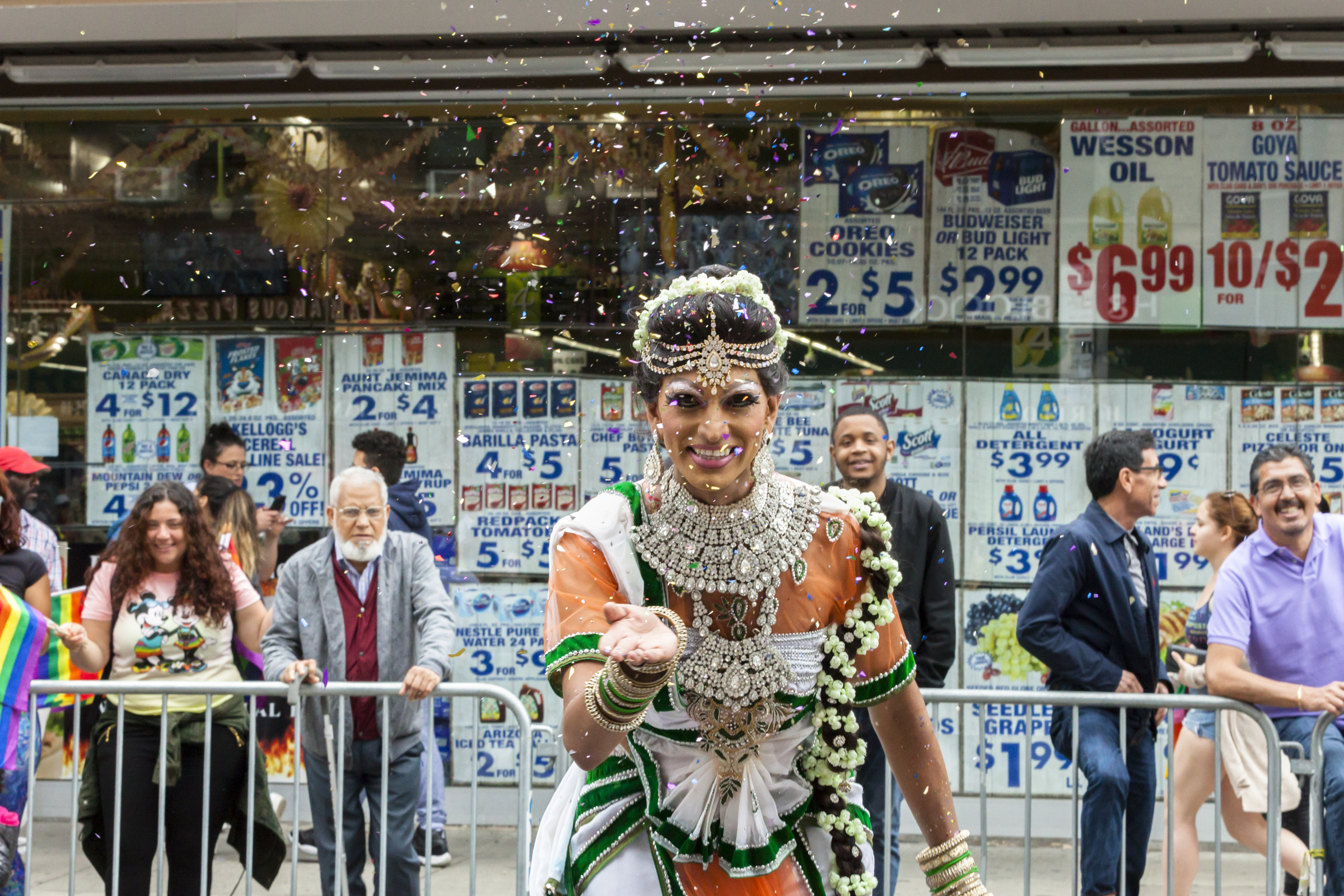
2018 Queens Pride Performer

On June 6, 1993, the Inaugural Queens Lesbian and Gay Parade and Block Party Festival took place in Jackson Heights. Co-organized by Daniel Dromm and Cuban-born LGBTQ rights activist Maritza Martinez and backed by over a dozen LGBTQ groups, it became the first successful event to be organized in any New York City borough outside Manhattan. Around 1,000 people joined the march, which had thousands of onlookers. Grand Marshals for the parade included City Councilman Tom Duane, Assemblywoman Deborah Glick, and activist Jeanne Manford. A mostly local affair, the march included two separate moments of silence. At 1:25pm, the Grand Marshals of the parade called for moment of silence in front of P.S. 69 to memorialize Julio Rivera and all victims of lesbian/gay bashings. Then at 3:00pm, a second moment of silence was taken during the music festival to remember those who had died of AIDS.

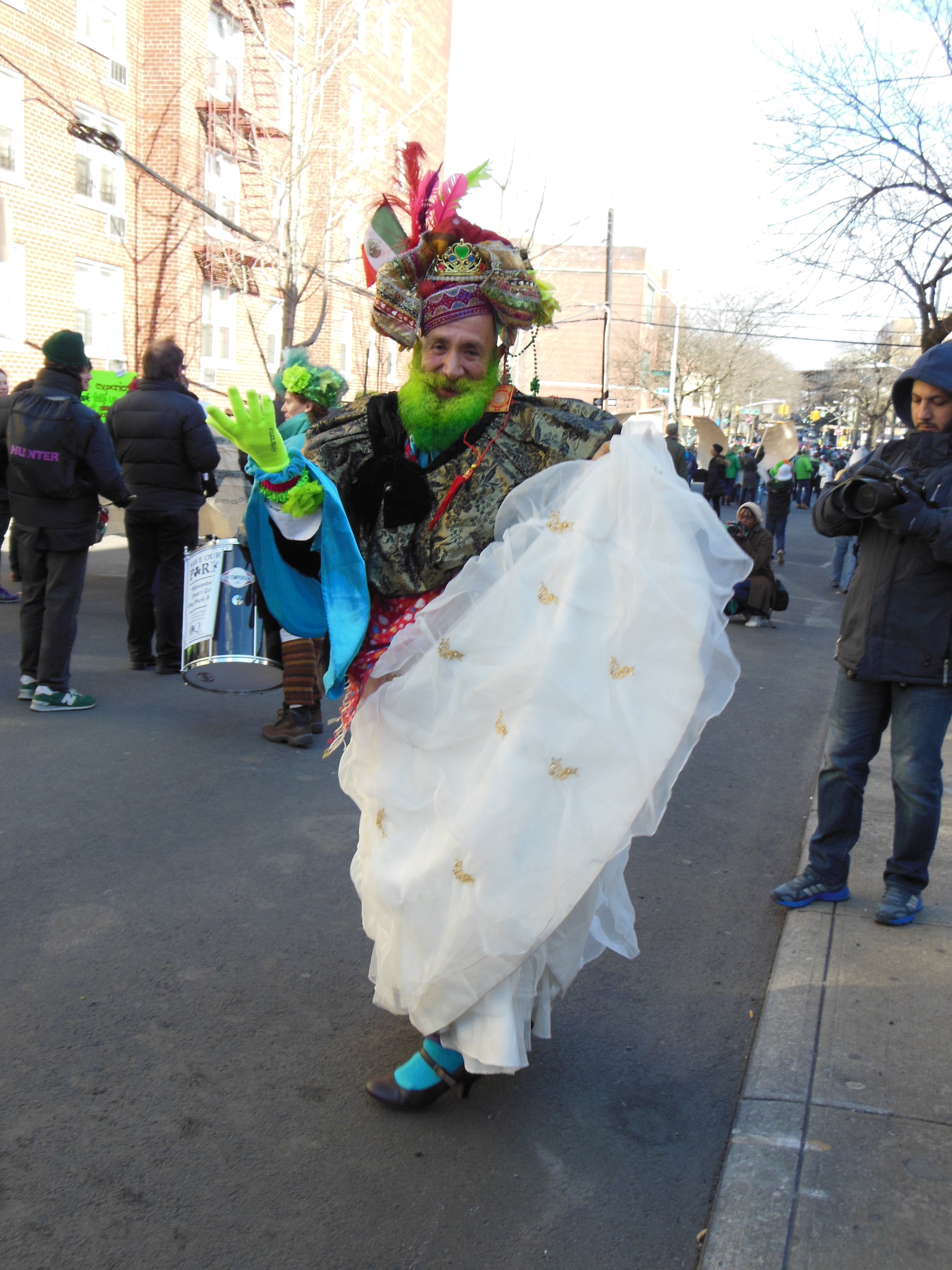
Ms. Colombia at St. Pat's For All parade 2013

In 2015, Mayor Bill de Blasio became the first New York City mayor to serve as a Grand Marshal.

Now an annual tradition, Queens Pride has attracted crowds of over 40,000 people, and is supported by politicians and sponsors such as the Queens Library, Uber, Go Magazine, Gaytravel.com, AIDS Center of Queens County, Gay City News, and Ibis Styles Hotels.

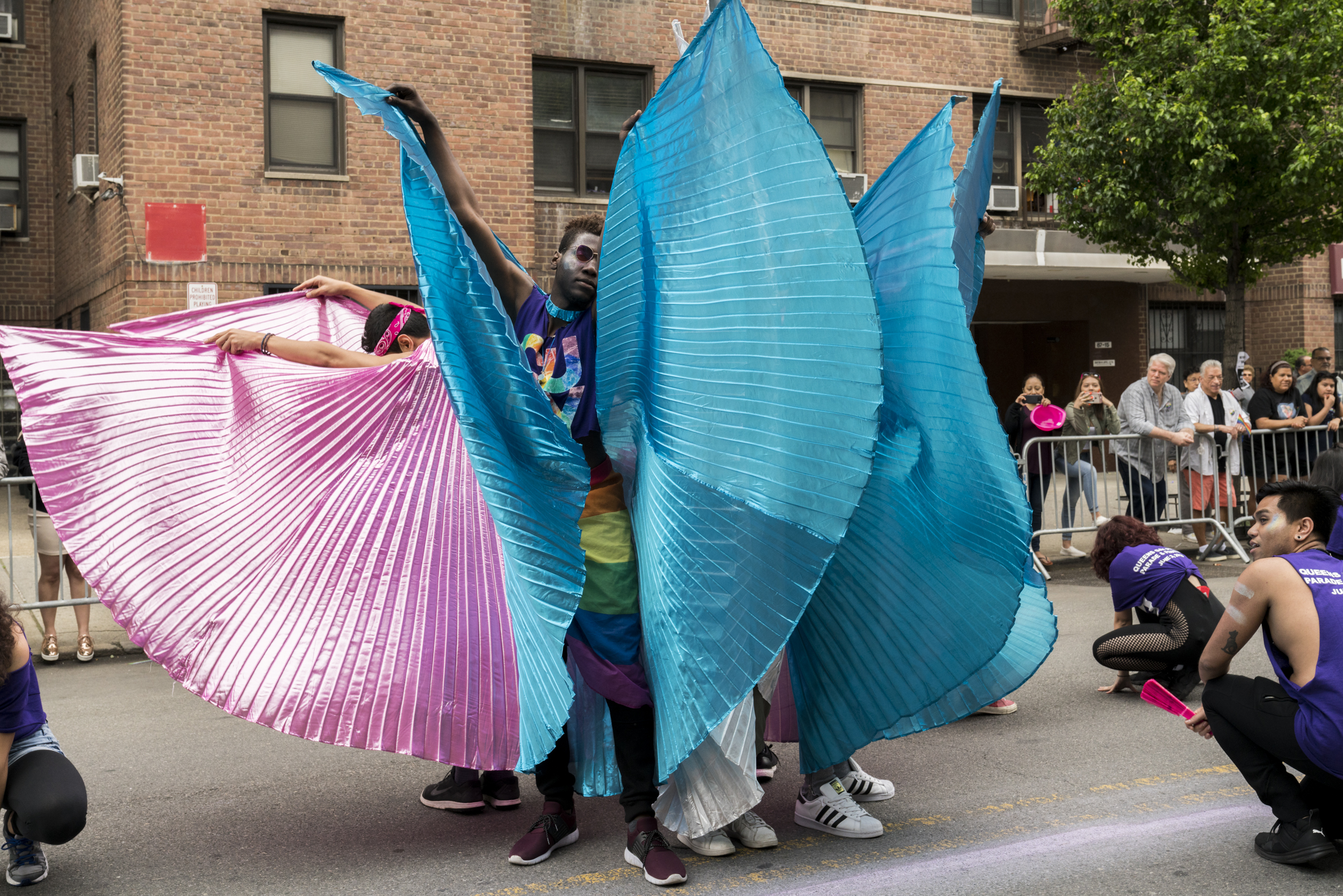
CUNY Student Performers at the Queens Pride Parade 2018

One iconic Queens Pride participant was Ms. Colombia, who Daniel Dromm characterized as "a real Jackson Heights character". A profile from the arts organization Visual AIDS describes her as being a "colorful and beloved performance artist". Born José Oswaldo Gómez, Ms. Colombia moved from Medellín to the United States in search for safety, as individuals who did not dress in gender specific ways were common targets for hate crimes in Colombia. After being diagnosed with HIV in the 1980s, Gómez determined to live "day by day", becoming Ms. Colombia, whose colorful dressing and parade-walking became a celebration of being alive. On October 4, 2018, New York City officials announced that her body was discovered at Jacob Riis beach, but no foul play was suspected. She was 64.

== Queens Lesbian and Gay Pride Committee ==
The parade's organizer, the Queens Lesbian & Gay Pride Committee (Queens Pride), is a 501(c)(3) not-for-profit volunteer organization founded in 1992 that coordinates LGBTQ pride events in Queens, New York. In addition to the annual Pride Parade and Multicultural Festival, Queens Pride fosters youth programming and a Winter Pride Dinner Dance.

== Grand Marshals of the Queens Pride March ==
1993

- NYC Council representative Thomas Duane
- Assemblywoman Deborah J. Glick
- Activist Jeanne Manford, founder of Parents, Families and Friends of Lesbians and Gays (PFLAG)

1994

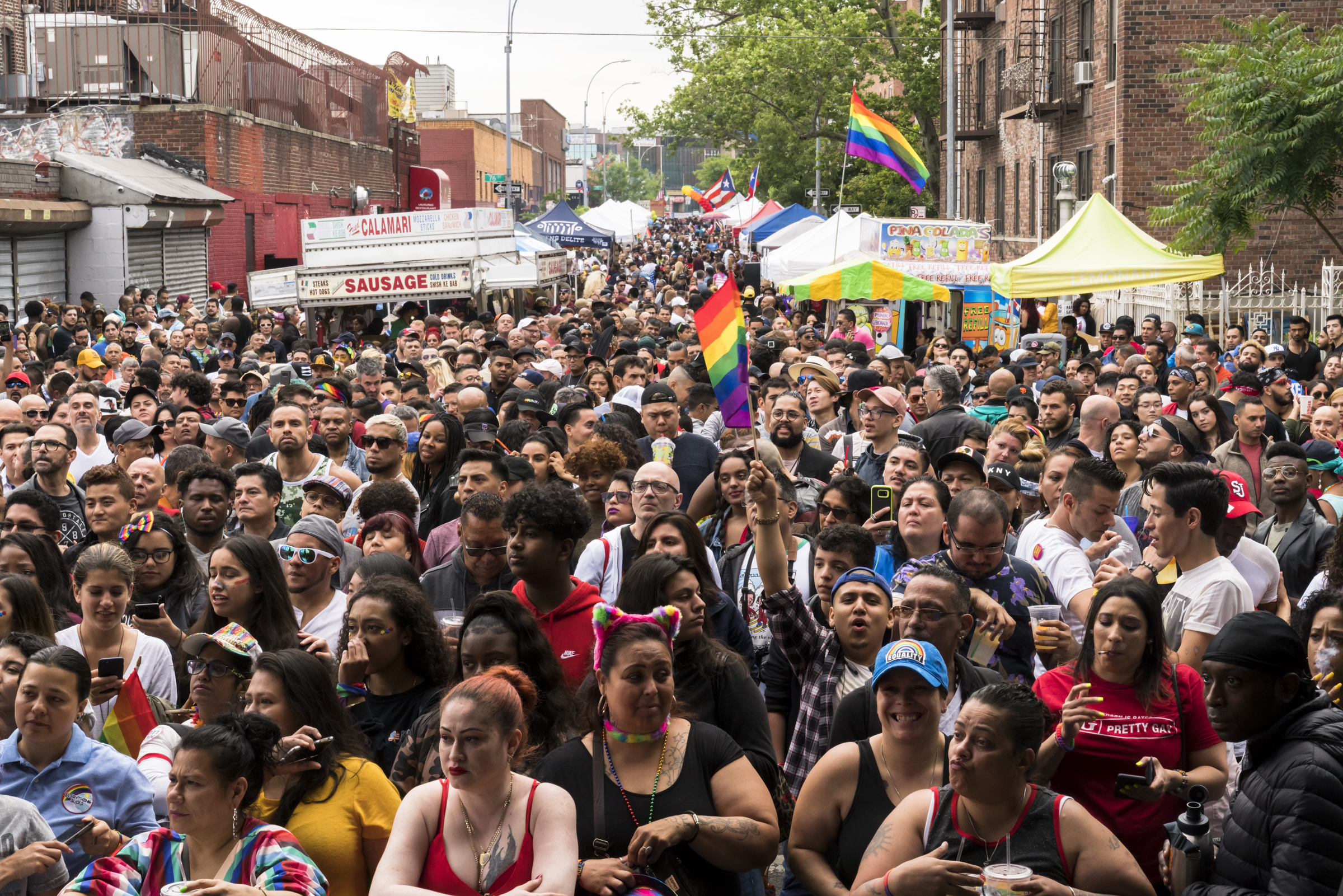
Crowd at the Multicultural Festival after the 2018 Queens Pride Parade

- NYC Comptroller Alan Hevesi
- Activist John J. Won, leader in the gay youth movement and AIDS education
- Activist Candice Boyce, leader of African Ancestral Lesbians United for Societal Change

1995

- NYC Public Advocate Mark Green
- 1994 NYS Attorney General candidate Judge Karen Burstein
- Activist Ed Sedarbaum, founder of Queens Gays and Lesbians United (Q-GLU)

1996

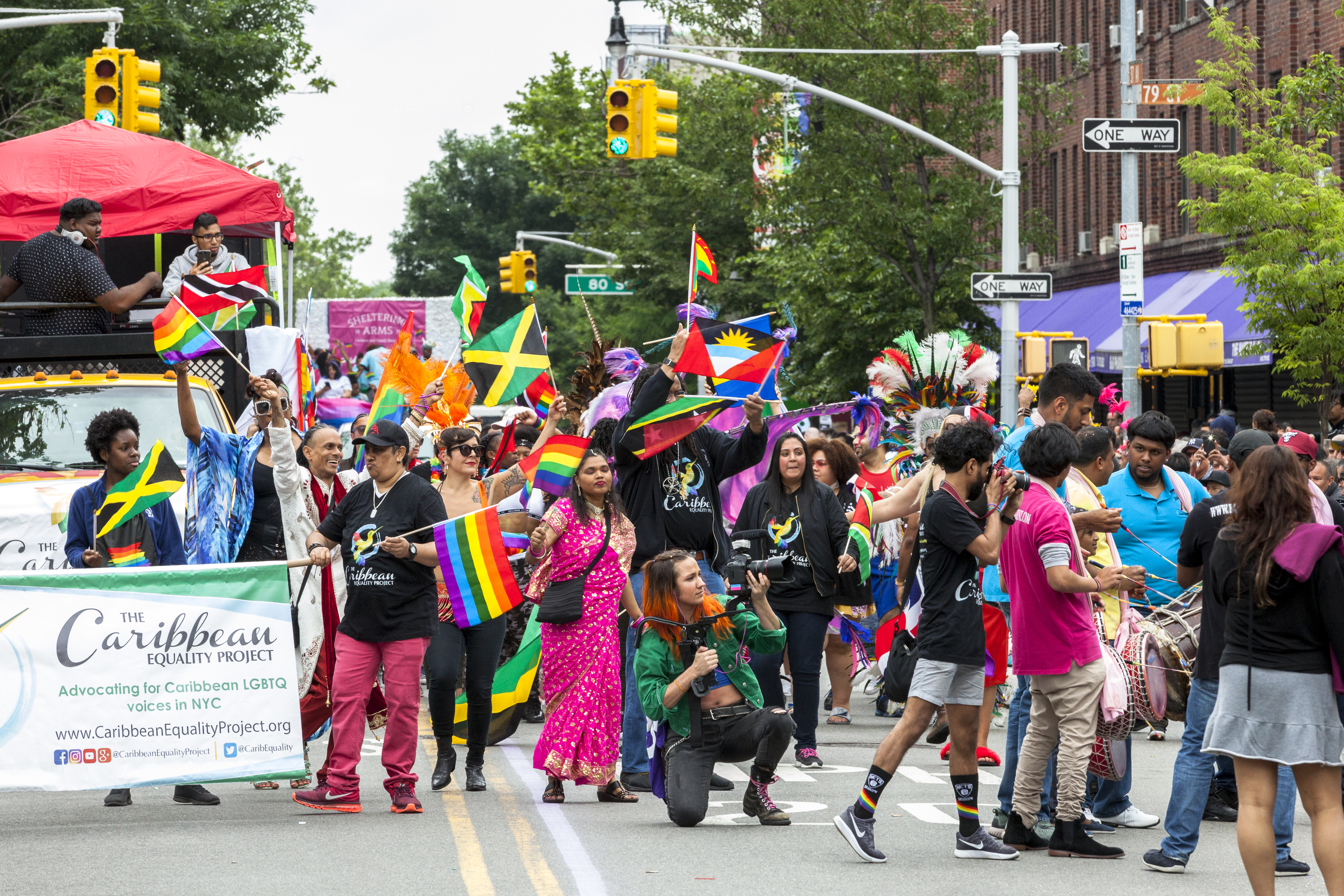
Caribbean Equality Project at the 2018 Queens Pride Parade

- Borough of Manhattan President Ruth Messinger
- Activist Brendan Fay
- Publisher Jean Sidebottom

1997

- NYC Comptroller H. Carl McCall
- Activist Janice Thom
- Activist Franklin G. Fry

1998

- NYC Council representative for Manhattan's Lower East Side Margarita Lopez
- NYC Council representative for Harlem and South Bronx Phil Reed
- Activist Betty Santoro

2000

- Transgender activist Barbra Ann Perina, Program Director of Lambda Treatment and Recovery Program
- Activist Angeline Acain, publisher of Gay Parent and Ripe Magazines

2001

- CEO of West End Records Mel Cheren
- LGBT organization for senior citizens Sage/Queens
- LGBT organization for straight and questioning youth under 21 years of age Generation Q

2010

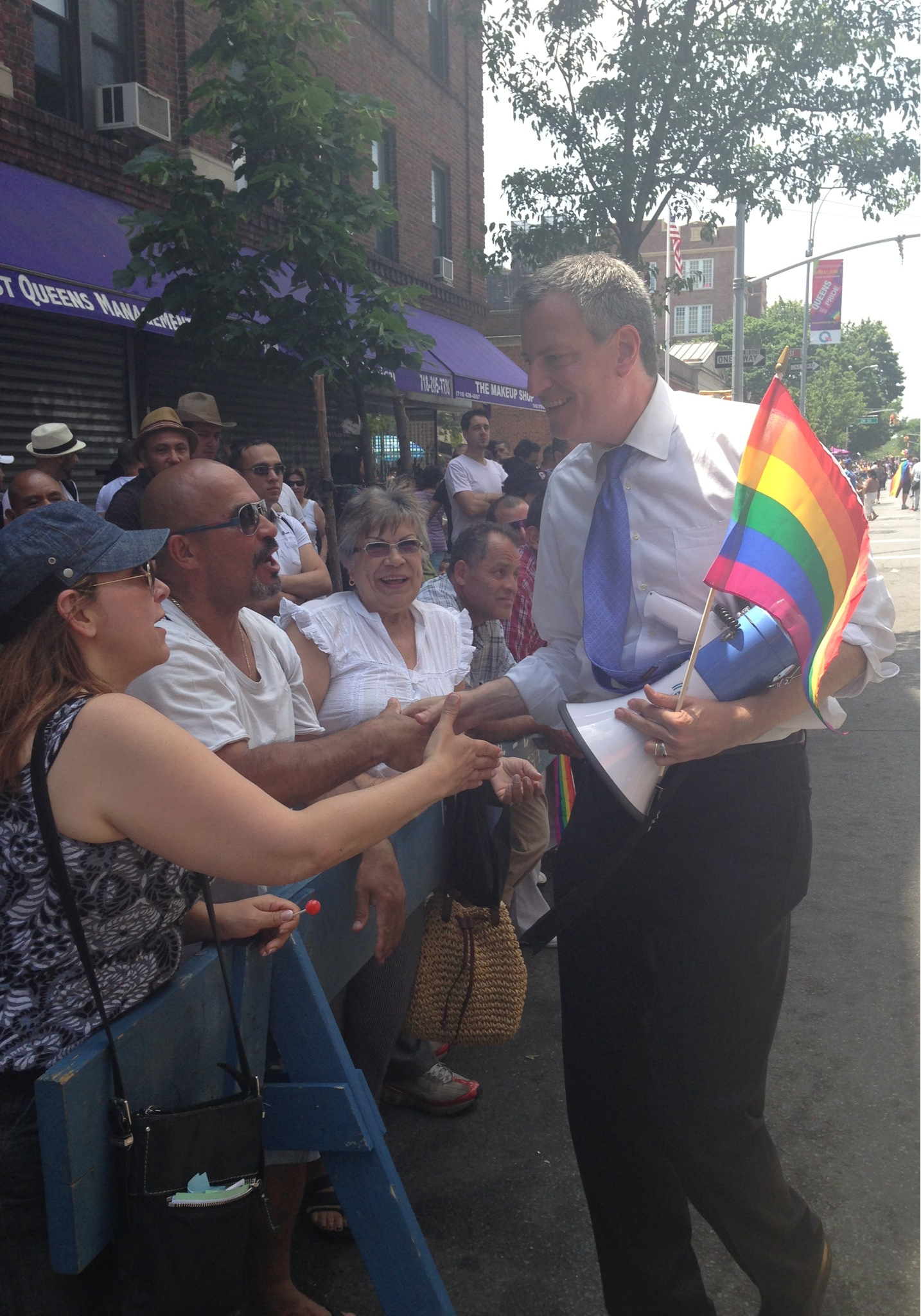
NYC Mayor Bill de Blasio at the 2013 Queens Pride Parade

- NYC Council representative Daniel Dromm
- NYC Council representative Jimmy Van Bramer

2015

- New York City mayor Bill de Blasio
- Apicha Community Health Center

2016

- Council representative Julissa Ferreras-Copeland
- Activist Jessica Stern, OutRight Action International Executive Director
- The AIDS Center of Queens County

2017

- Bianey Garcia, trans activist with Make the Road New York
- Thomas DiNapoli, New York State Comptroller
- Sheltering Arms, nonprofit

2018

- Queens Borough President Melinda Katz
- Activist Elijah Betts, the youngest non-binary-identified leader at the LGBTQ organization Generation Q

2019

- Singer-songwriter Candy Samples
- Activist Jesse Pasackow who, with Candy Samples, created the Candy Wrappers AIDS Walk New York City team
- Queens Pride Lions Club
- Mirror Beauty Cooperative, New York City's first trans-Latinx run business

2022

- City Council Speaker Adrienne Adams
- Colectivo Intercultural TRANSgrediendo
- Caribbean Equality Project

2023

- Linda Lee, New York City Council Member
- Lynn Schulman, New York City Council Member
- Selvena Brooks-Powers, New York City Council Member
- Shekar Krishnan, New York City Council Member
- Drag Story Hour NYC, a creative arts program
- CUNY LGBTQIA+ Consortium
- Ceyenne Doroshow, Founder and Executive Director, G.L.I.T.S.

2024

- Leroy Comrie, New York State Senator, New York City Councilman

2025

- Catalina Cruz, New York State Assembly Member
- Jessica González-Rojas, New York State Assembly Member
- Andry Hernández Romero (honorary)

== See also ==
- Drag culture in New York City
- LGBT culture in New York City
- New York City Drag March
- New York City Pride March
- Queens Liberation Front
- St. Pat's for All
