= Betty Santoro =

American activist

- Born: Elizabeth Ann Botta; April 26, 1938; Brooklyn, New York, U.S.
- Died: December 10, 2005 (age 67)
- Occupation(s): Educator, activist, community leader

Betty Santoro (April 26, 1938 – December 10, 2005), born Elizabeth Ann Botta, was an American educator, activist and community leader, based in New York City. She was one of the organizers and keynote speakers at the 1979 March on Washington for lesbian, gay, and bisexual rights.

== Early life and education ==
Botta was born in Brooklyn and raised in Queens, the daughter of John Botta and Madeline Casertano Botta. Her father managed a garage, and her mother worked in a silk factory. She attended Catholic schools, and graduated from New York University.

== Career ==
Botta was a physical education teacher in high schools and colleges in New York City, including Queens College and Nassau Community College. She used the surname "Santoro" for her activism, to minimize the risk to her employment. She was a member of Lesbian Feminist Liberation in the early 1970s, and was part of building the Coalition for Lesbian and Gay Rights in 1977. In 1979, she was one of the organizers of the March on Washington for gay rights, and a keynote speaker at the event. In 1978 and 1983, she testified at public hearings in support of adding sexual orientation to New York City's human rights law, saying "it is both humiliating and degrading that we should have to stand here once again and try to convince anyone that we have suffered enough to deserve to be treated like human beings." In 1998, she was one of the three grand marshals of the Queens Pride Parade.

== Personal life ==
Santoro died in 2005, at the age of 67, from a cerebral hemorrhage.

== Publications ==
- "'If We Gay Men and Lesbians' Stand Up" (1980, with Andrew Humm)
