= St. John's Preparatory School (Queens) =

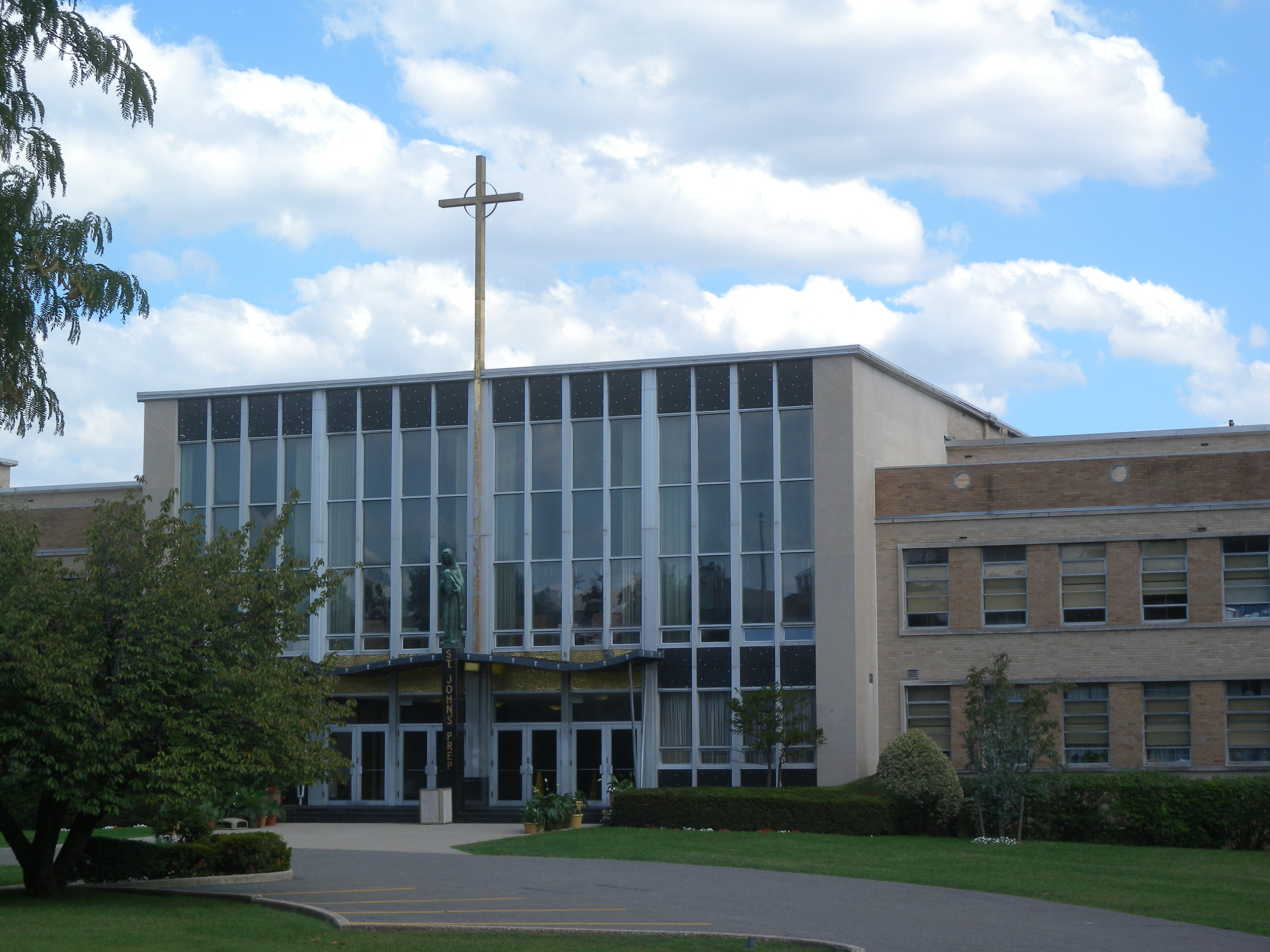

Location
- 21-21 Crescent Street; Astoria, Queens, New York 11105; United States; 40°46′46″N 73°54′44″W

Information
- Type: Private
- Religious affiliations: Catholic; Vincentian Fathers
- Established: 1870 (St. John's Prep) opened on Lewis Avenue, Brooklyn, 1980 (Crescent Street school)
- Principal: Maria Johnson
- Grades: 9-12
- Gender: Coeducational
- Colors: Red and White
- Slogan: "That they may have life more abundantly.." (John 10:10)
- Athletics conference: Catholic High School Athletic Association
- Team name: Red Storm
- Rival: Monsignor McClancy Memorial High School
- School fees: $350 registration fees
- Tuition: $9,600 (2019-20)
- Website: stjohnsprepschool.org

St. John's Preparatory School is a private, Catholic high school in the Astoria neighborhood of Queens, New York City, New York. It is located within the Diocese of Brooklyn.

== Background ==
St. John's Preparatory School was established in 1870 by the Vincentian Fathers as the Preparatory Department of St. John's College (later University). In 1955 the College moved out to its new campus and the prep school further expanded, taking over its former buildings. Through the early 1970s, St. John's Prep was all-boys, located in Bedford–Stuyvesant, Brooklyn on Lewis and Hart Avenues. The school closed temporarily in 1972 but reopened in 1981 on Crescent Street in Astoria.

Mater Christi Diocesan High School was founded in 1961 through the efforts of Bryan J. McEntegart, then the Bishop of Brooklyn. It had separate boys' and girls' divisions which were staffed by De La Salle Brothers and Sisters of Mercy respectively. In 1974 the divisions were merged to become a fully coeducational school. In 1977 it was turned over to a community-based board of trustees and became known as Mater Christi Catholic High School. The school motto was "Ut vitam habeant et abundantius " from the Gospel of John 10:10, "That They May Have Life More Abundantly." In 1980 the school announced an affiliation with St. John's University. St. John's Prep's charter was re-issued and Mater Christi became St. John's Preparatory School.

St. John's Prep is affiliated with St. John's University, but it is run by an independent board of trustees, which includes members of the Vincentian community. The faculty and the administration are laypeople and also religious sisters and brothers from several Catholic religious orders, including most notably, the Sisters of Mercy and the Sisters of St. Joseph. The Sisters of St. Joseph also helped start the Holy Family Catholic Academy in Fresh Meadows, New York.

== Course offerings ==
St. John's Tests offers Standardized Tests New York State Regents, a complete selection of college-credit electives, Advanced Placement courses, exciting Performing Arts and Visual Arts program: International Travel, STEM Program, Computer Science, Forensics, comprehensive world language program and so much more. All students graduate with a New York Regents diploma and in 2023, 90% of the senior class won an academic scholarship to college.

=== Baccalaureate Program ===
St. John's offers an exclusive Baccalaureate Program of study as a result of its affiliation with St. John's University. Qualified students may in senior year go the university where they take college courses that account for both their high school diploma and their first year of college. Thus, Prep students can complete high school and attain a baccalaureate degree from the university in seven years rather than the typical eight. Students are eligible to apply for this program if they successfully complete the prescribed academic course of study. As underclassmen, students take a number of advanced courses that are specifically designed so students by junior year will have met all the pre-requisites for most degree programs offered by the university. In the middle of the junior year, the students may choose to complete their final year of high school at St.John's University. Students who remain at St. John's Prep may take advantage of the college courses taught at the Prep. The students can earn over 30 college credits which are accepted at most major colleges and universities.

== School ==
The Gymnasium has modern equipment with a multi-use for seating up to 2,200 people. The Physical Fitness Center has modern Weight Stations, the Outdoor Track Field is a 6 lane, 1/8 mile oval track. The Auditorium seats 2,100 people, with a stage, sound and lighting. The Music Center has band and instrumental rooms. The Library has 30,000 books, and over 8,000 audio visual materials. The Library Center is the yearbook and newspaper composing rooms. The Student Bookstore has up-to-date publications, first quality school athletic wear and souvenirs. The cafeteria has a dining and kitchen facility for 800. The school has two elevators for wheelchair accessibility.

== Notable alumni ==
- Johnny Bach, professional basketball player and coach of the Golden State Warriors
- Taliek Brown, professional basketball player and player development coach for UConn Huskies men's basketball
- Mario Cuomo, 52nd Governor of New York
- Vincent Di Maio, forensic pathologist and author
- Bryant Dunston, professional basketball player for Bnei HaSharon
- Rima Fakih, winner of the Miss USA 2010 title
- Vern Fleming, 18th pick in the 1984 NBA draft
- John Guare playwright, Six Degrees of Separation
- Vicky Jeudy, actress in Orange Is the New Black
- Thomas J. Manton, member of the U.S. House of Representatives from New York's 9th and 7th district
- Sal Marchiano, sportscaster
- Al McGuire, basketball player, coach, and sportscaster
- Francisco Moya, member of the New York City Council for the 21st District
- Robert Rygor, cisgender gay rights activist and political candidate and HIV-AIDS Activist
- Bob Sheppard, teacher and announcer for the New York Yankees
- Paul Vallone, member of the New York City Council for the 19th District
- Peter Vallone, Jr., judge and former member of the New York City Council from the 22nd District
- Clyde Vanel, member of the New York State Assembly from the 33rd District
