= Robert Rygor =

American HIV-AIDS activist (1953–1994)

Robert Rygor (1953–1994) was an Irish-American LGBTQ rights activist who was active from the late 1970s through the mid-1990s. He became an advocate for HIV-AIDS victims shortly after the disease became widespread among many sexually active gay men and drug users in the early 1980s. He was diagnosed with the virus in 1990, passing away four years later.

== Early life ==
Rygor was born in New York City in 1953 to Stanley and Kathleen Rygor. He lived in Astoria, Queens, with his four siblings. He disclosed his sexual orientation to his parents in 1971.

Rygor graduated from Mater Christi Catholic High School (now known as Saint John's Preparatory School) in 1971. He later attended New York University (NYU) and studied finance in graduate school.

Rygor briefly worked for Morgan Stanley before he was employed at the New York State Department of Taxation and Finance.

== Activism ==
Rygor moved out of his parents' house while attending NYU and rented an apartment in the neighborhood of Greenwich Village on West 11th Street in Manhattan. His move enabled him to run for public office to represent the borough of Manhattan.

In 1978, Rygor protested the New York City St. Patrick's Day parade for excluding members of the lesbian, gay male, bisexual, transgender, and/or Queer (LGBTQ+) community from marching under a gay banner. In 1980, he became the first openly gay man to run for a seat in the New York State Assembly. He did not win the election.

Rygor campaigned for many causes in the 1980s including LGBTQ+ rights, parks restoration, conservation and restoration of cultural property, safer neighborhoods, and sex education in schools.

In 1990, he unsuccessfully ran for the New York State Assembly for a second time. At the time, he worked for AIDS Coalition To Unleash Power (ACT-UP), a grassroots political group that was established to end the spread of the AIDS disease using advocacy. He lost the primary election to fellow gay candidate and only cisgender lesbian to serve in the history of the New York State Legislature Deborah J. Glick.

In 1992, he testified at the National Democratic Party Platform Committee Hearings in order to advocate for the inclusion of AIDS educational awareness and its public funding into their platform. He also traveled to the West African country of Cameroon for the 7th International Conference on AIDS in Africa.

In 1993, Rygor was the office manager for ACT-UP, and he got vocally involved in a political battle between the New York City Board of Education and activists on the issue of educating students about respecting and tolerating gay people and the gay identity or homosexuality. In an interview with a New York Times Reporter, Rygor said, "The religious right has been mobilizing their constituencies in the outer boroughs, bringing their religious dogma into the public school system. It's a movement that we as AIDS activists are concerned about." Rygor had been circulating a petition to run for Community School Board 2 on The Upper East Side of Manhattan.

He was diagnosed with AIDS in 1990, succumbing to the disease in 1994.

== Legacy ==
After his death, Rygor's parents continued his activism. His father Stanley, a World War II veteran, was a regular participant in the St. Pat's for All parade and AIDS Walk New York.

Rygor's parents advocated for marriage equality and for the Irish LGBTQ+ group Lavender and Green Alliance to participate in the New York City St Patrick's Day Parade.

The corner of 34th Street & Broadway in Queens was co-named "Stanley, Kathleen & Robert Rygor Way" during a ceremony on May 2, 2022, in honor of the family, who lived on the block for decades.
