= Kindred Spirits (sculpture) =

Outdoor sculpture in County Cork, Ireland

Coordinates: 51.9061°N 8.1748°W

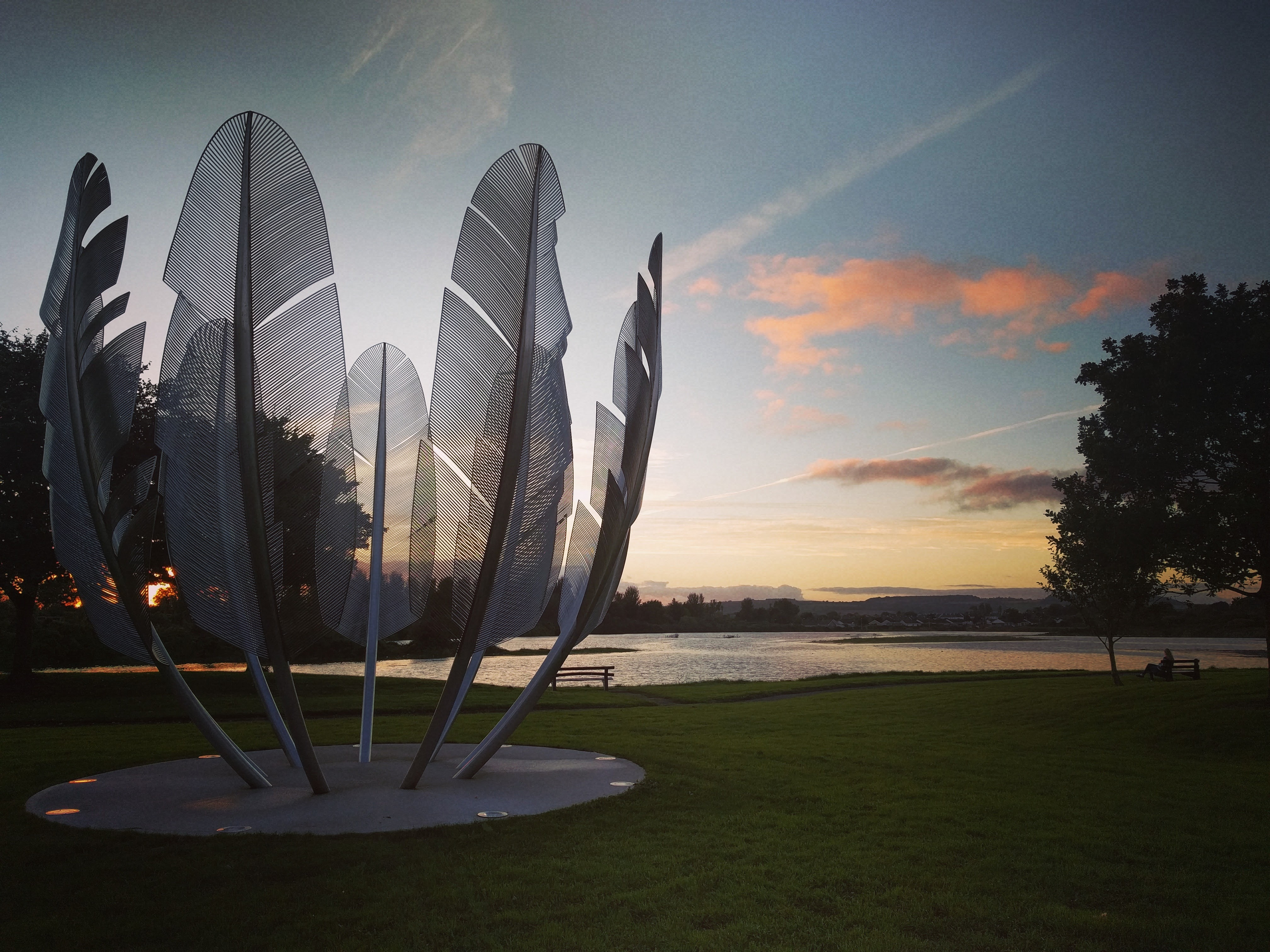
Photo of Kindred Spirits sculpture, Midleton, County Cork.

Kindred Spirits is a large stainless steel outdoor sculpture in Bailick Park in Midleton, County Cork, Ireland.

Created by artist Alex Pentek, Kindred Spirits commemorates the 1847 donation by the Native American Choctaw people to Irish famine relief during the Great Famine, despite the Choctaw themselves living in hardship and poverty and having recently endured the Trail of Tears. While records of the exact amount of the donation vary, the figure usually given is US$170 (about $5,900 in 2025 inflation-adjusted dollars, though some methods indicate it could have been as high as $20,000 in 2015 dollars). (Note: The former according to the American Federal Reserve Consumer Price Index estimate; the latter according to the Sunday Times.) In the U.S. coinage of the time, U.S.$170 meant 8.22 troy ounces of physical gold, or about US$14,000 in 2020 prices.

The sculpture consists of nine 20-foot (6.1 m) stainless steel eagle feathers arranged in a circle, no two feathers being identical, forming a bowl shape to represent an empty bowl of food. With over 20,000 welds and taking a year to make, it was created by Alex Pentek at the National Sculpture Factory in Cork, with assistance to polish the finished work from students of the city's Crawford College of Art and Design, and installed in Bailick Park in 2015. The memorial was commissioned by Midleton Town Council, and was officially unveiled and dedicated in June 2017 by Chief Gary Batton, Chief of the Choctaw Nation of Oklahoma, Assistant Chief Jack Austin Jr., and Councillor Seamus McGrath, County Mayor of Cork, accompanied by a 20-strong delegation from the Choctaw Nation.

A companion sculpture, Eternal Heart, was unveiled in Tuskahoma, Oklahoma in 2024 to further commemorate Choctaw-Irish relations.

== See also ==
- Feathers in religion and culture
- Native American and Irish interactions
