= Native American and Irish interactions =

Interactions between Native American and Irish people

Native American nations, Irish immigrants to the United States, and residents of Ireland have a history of often-supportive interactions dating back to the start of the Great Famine. Across multiple generations, people from both communities have drawn attention to their parallel histories of colonization by English-speaking countries. Scholarship on, and press attention to, these interactions has highlighted both acts of solidarity and the participation of some Irish immigrants in the invasion and dispossession of Native Americans.

== First interactions ==
Seal of the Choctaw Nation

The Choctaw tribe had significant influence from the McCurtain family. Beginning with Daniel McCurtain, an Irish immigrant who had fought in the American Revolution and later married a Choctaw woman, and his descendant Cornelius McCurtain (born 1803), who became a chief of the Choctaw tribe. Cornelius' sons Jackson McCurtain, Edmund McCurtain, and Green McCurtain all later became principal chiefs of the Choctaw nation.

Cooperation between the Irish and Native American nations dates to at least the mid-19th century, a time of trauma in both regions. The Trail of Tears, the forced mass relocation of Native American tribes from the American Southeast to the Indian Territory (later known as Oklahoma), took place between 1830 and 1850. Thousands died of disease or starvation during the journey. The first nation to be relocated was the Choctaw tribe of modern-day states Alabama, Mississippi, and Louisiana into southern Oklahoma.

The Great Famine was the mass starvation and spread of disease from 1845 to 1849. One million Irish died and more than a million were forced to emigrate, causing Ireland's population to drop by more than 20%. It is said that during the Trail of Tears, members of the Choctaw Nation heard about the Famine from an Irish soldier. Only shortly after their relocation, Choctaw collected money to send to Ireland. The Choctaw of Skullyville donated $170 and the Choctaw of Doaksville donated $150. Both donations are valued at roughly $5000 today. The Cherokee Nation also donated $200. Padraig Kirwan is a senior lecturer at Goldsmiths University, and the co-author of Famine Pots: The Choctaw Irish Gift Exchange 1874-Present with LeAnne Howe from the Choctaw Nation. She says "There is a symbiosis of what it means to be a colonized people and to have lived through cultural trauma." After being sent to Midleton in County Cork, funds were used to purchase food, blankets, and feed for livestock, which were distributed by the Quaker community.

According to historian Diarmaid Ferriter, the donations "showed how far the famine resonated that it reached people 4,000 miles away who had themselves recently suffered terrible deprivation and clearance from their land. There is a belief that the famine has never been forgotten here, and it has made Irish people more likely to make common cause with other marginalized people." Conor Donnan, an Irish historian, says that "The Choctaw donating to Irish was not just philanthropic, but it was also a critique of imperialism in the United States, ... these were nations that were victims of the Anglo-Protestant imperial project."

In Rotha Mór an tSaoil (published in English as "The Hard Road to Klondike"), his posthumously published Irish language memoir of living in the American Wild West and of the Klondike Gold Rush, Micí Mac Gabhann wrote often of how often he and fellow Irish-Americans spoke to each other about there being clear parallels between how the United States Federal Government was treating the Native population and how the British Empire was treating the Irish.

== Early 20th century ==
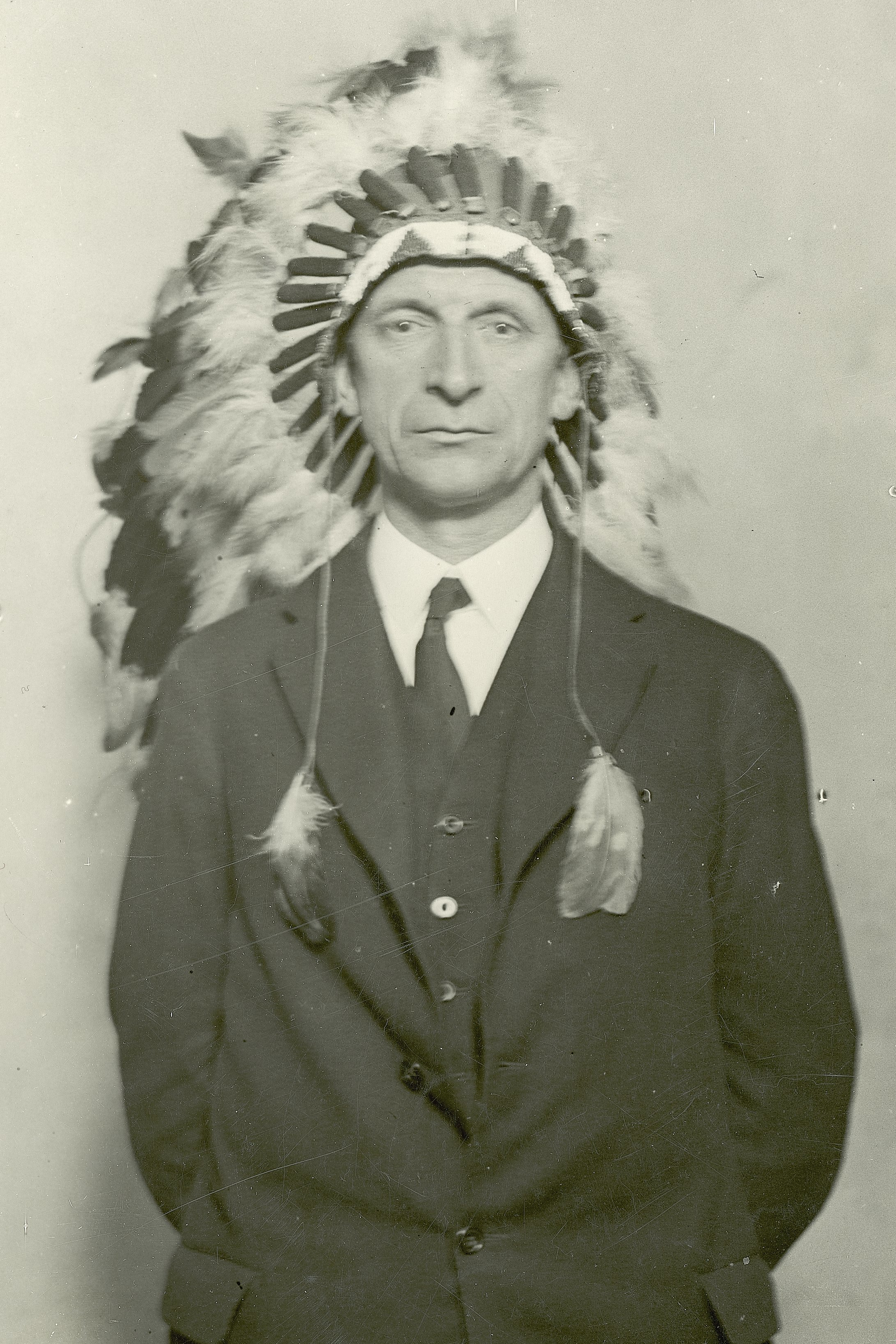
Éamon de Valera wearing Chippewa Headdress, 1919

In 1919, during the Irish war for independence, Irish president Éamon de Valera went to the US to raise support. He met with the Lac Court Oreille Band of the Ojibwe in Wisconsin. There, in front of the 3,000-member tribe, he was made an honorary chief of the Ojibwe. Joe Kingfisher, the Tribal Chief, described his wishes to give de Valera, "the prettiest blossom of the fairest flower on earth, for you come to us as a representative of one oppressed nation to another". The Irish and Ojibwe traded gifts, the Irish receiving a headdress, and the Ojibwe receiving multiple .38 caliber guns, which they still have today.

De Valera was given the name Nay Nay Ong Abe ("Dressing Feather") after a historic Chippewa chief. De Valera delivered a speech in Irish, drawing a parallel between the Irish and Native American struggles for freedom. De Valera stated:

I speak to you in Gaelic…because I want to show you that though I am white I am not of the English race. We, like you, are a people who have suffered, and I feel for you with a sympathy that comes only from one who can understand as we Irishmen can. You say you are not free. Neither are we free, and I sympathise with you because we are making a similar fight. As a boy, I read and understood of your slavery and longed to become one of you.

== Modern ==
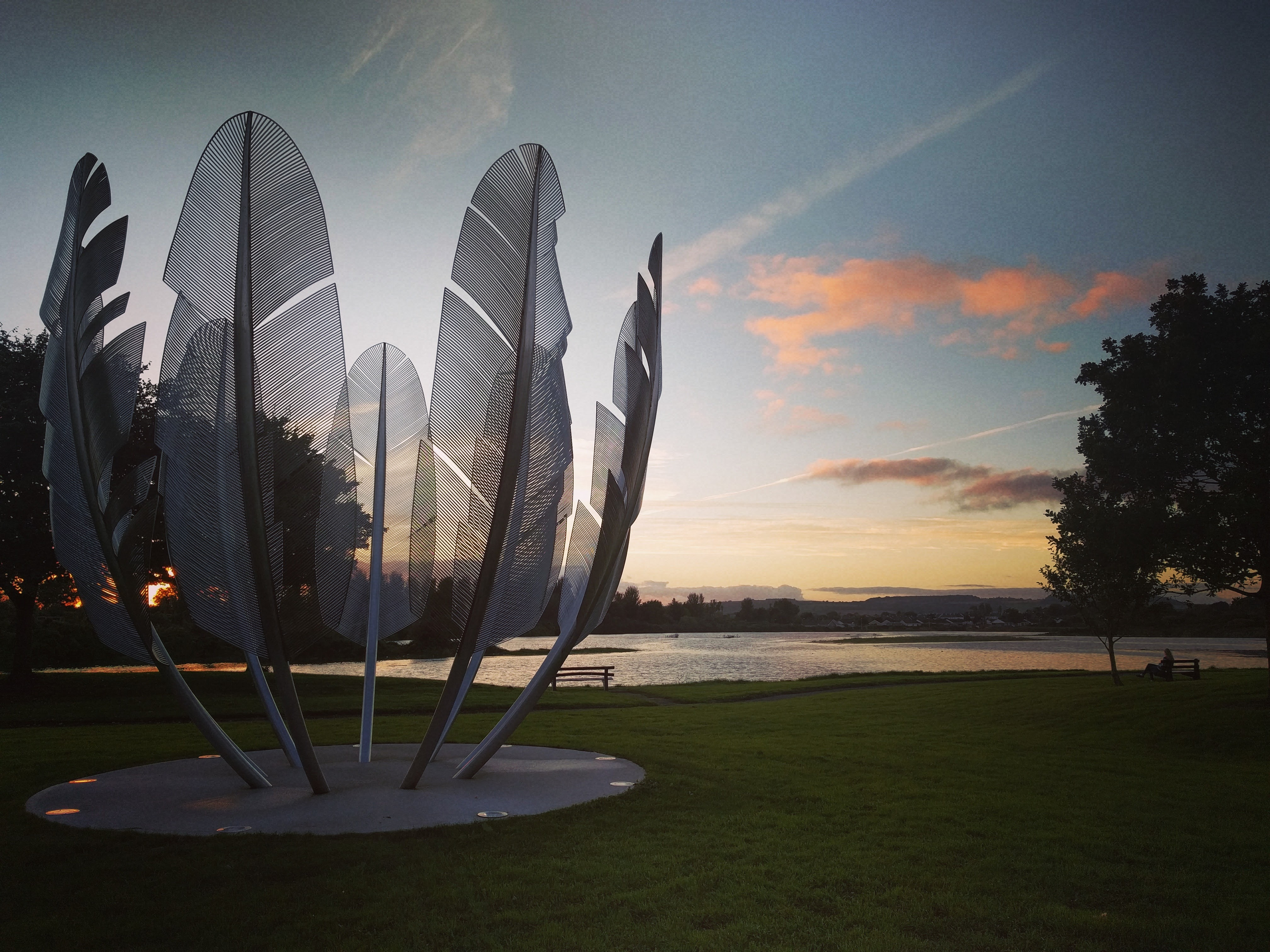
Kindred Spirits in Cork

- In 1990: Choctaw leaders visited County Mayo in Ireland, and participate in the first "Famine Walk". This is a reenactment of the walk in 1848 made by starving Irish to their landlords.
- In 1992: 22 Irish leaders visited the Choctaw Nation to participate in the annual Trail of Tears memorial walk.
- In 1992: Mansion House, the residence of the Lord Mayor of Dublin since 1715, installed a plaque in honor of the Choctaw aid.
- In 1995: The Irish President, Mary Robinson, visited the Choctaw Nation to thank them for their donation.
- In 2017: Kindred Spirits is a sculpture in Bailick Park, Midleton, County Cork, Ireland, which was unveiled in 2017 to acknowledge and thank the Choctaw Nation for their donation. The sculpture features nine 20-foot stainless steel eagle feathers.
- In 2018: The Taoiseach, Leo Varadkar, visited the Choctaw nation.
  - There, he announced that members of the Choctaw tribe have the opportunity to earn scholarships and get free tuition at Irish universities.
  - Ireland's Consul General visited again the next year.
- In 2019: Studies begin for the first recipient of the Choctaw-Ireland Scholarship Program.
  - Recipients get full tuition at University College Cork as well as 10,000 euros for living expenses.
- In 2020: Ireland donates to the Navajo and Hopi Nations during the COVID-19 pandemic in a program called "pay it forward". A GoFundMe page was created to help the Hopi and Navajo tribes fight Covid. It raised over US$4 million, tens of thousands coming from Irish donors. At the time, the Navajo and Hopi tribes had the highest rates of Covid outside of New York and New Jersey. The communications director for the fundraiser, Cassandra Begay, attempted to spread awareness through Twitter. Chief of the Choctaw Nation, Gary Batton, responded to these donations, saying "We have become kindred spirits with the Irish in the years since the Irish potato famine. We hope the Irish, Navajo and Hopi peoples develop lasting friendships, as we have."
- In September 2020, the Irish National Lacrosse team gave up their spot in the World Lacrosse Championship to the Iroquois Nationals - a joint team of players from the Mohawk, Onondaga, Oneida, Cayuga, Seneca and Tuscarora Nations. The Iroquois National Team had not been invited to the tournament because organizers refused to recognize them as a Sovereign Nation.
- In March 2021 Poets Doireann Ní Ghríofa from Ireland and LeAnne Howe from the Choctaw Nation collaborated, presented by the O.B. Hardison Poetry Series.
- In 2024, the Choctaw Nation unveiled the "Eternal Heart" sculpture in Oklahoma. It was created by tribal member Samuel Stitt and jointly funded by the Irish government and the Chahta Foundation as a companion to Midleton's "Kindred Spirits" sculpture, symbolising the enduring friendship forged by the Choctaws' 1847 famine donation to Ireland.
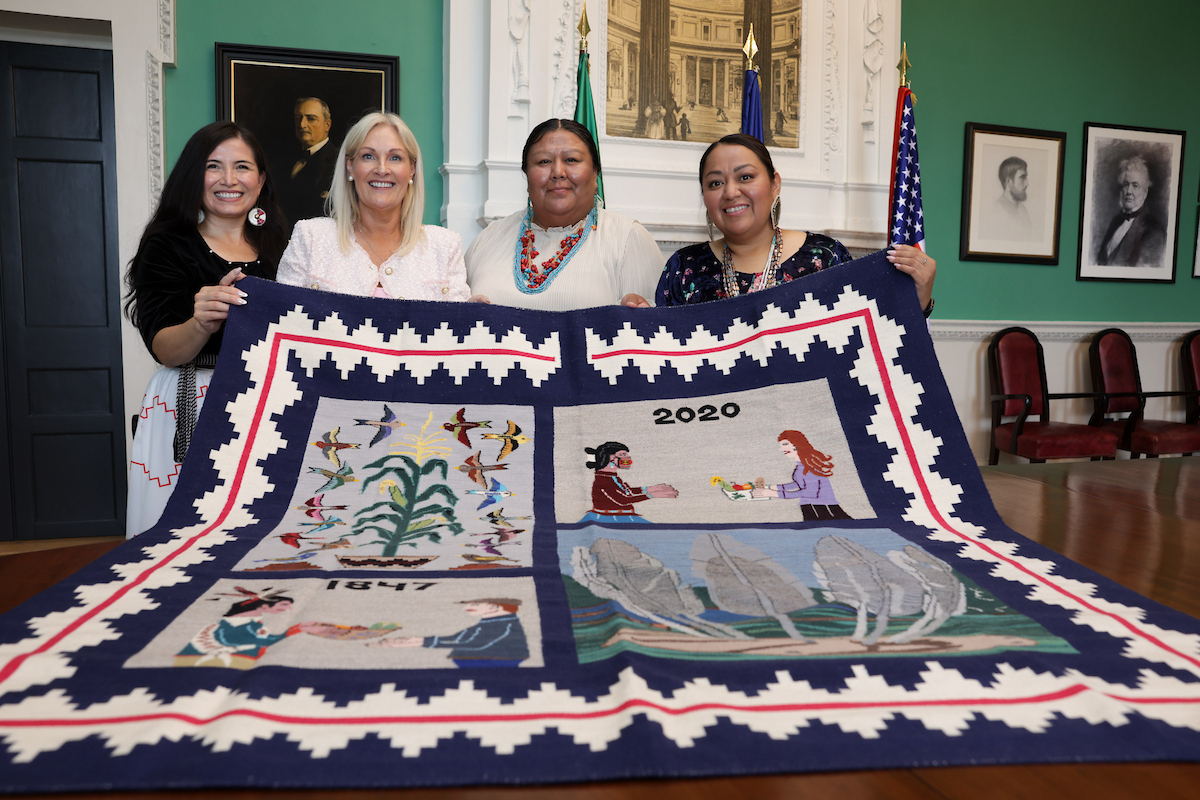
- Navajo & Hopi Families COVID-19 Relief Fund gift a rug to the Irish Oirechtas, July 2025.
  In July 2025, the Navajo and Hopi Nations presented a handwoven rug to the Irish people as a gesture of thanks for donations made during the COVID-19 pandemic, which raised over $3 million from Ireland alone. The rug, depicting the Kindred Spirits sculpture commemorating the Choctaw's 1847 famine donation to Ireland, was gifted to Ceann Comhairle Verona Murphy as a symbol of lasting friendship and mutual compassion.

== See also ==
- Native American–Jewish relations
